= Heijō =

Heijō may refer to:

- Heijō, the Japanese colonial-era name for Pyongyang, the present capital of North Korea
- Heijō-kyō, the ancient Japanese capital located in present-day Nara
- Emperor Heijō (773-824) 51st emperor of Japan

== See also ==
- Heijō Station
