= Tipsy night =

Japanese rock band

Tipsy night (チイプシ ナイト; chiipushi naito) is a Japanese rock band from Nara. The group consists of one MC and three members: Higashi (vocal), D-C (lead guitar), Tenno (bass) and Yokoyuki (drums). Tipsy night made their major label debut on October 21, 2001, with the release of their first single Sekaiichi (世界一). They are known for performing the new 18th opening of Gintama. They also contributed for the three games of Naruto: Gekitō Ninja Taisen! 4 (僕の愛してるだれもいない) by singing each of their main themes. Tipsy night commended Fukuda's more mature sound, noting a greater emphasis on vocal tracks than before.

== History ==
The origin of the name comes from young age of members. When searching on the internet for a backronym Higashi discovered Tipsy night and the connection to Radiohead, whose members are of the same generation. The team expresses in their songs approach to the world. They sing about the passage of years and the reluctance to grow up, as evidenced by the outrageous behavior at concerts.

On September 3, 2006, the band announced that they would make their official debut through Sony Music Japan's Epic Records, which was also the label of Higashi's solo project My Day. The band performed at the Japanese Animelo in Tokyo on July 7, 2007. Their debut peaked at no.2 on the Oricon charts. On July 16, 2008, Tipsy night released a live DVD from the concert they held in February 2009.

== Members ==
- Higashi – vocals
- D-C – lead guitar
- Yokoyuki – drums
- Tenno – bass

== Discography ==
Studio albums

- Sekaiichi (世界一)
- Wasuremono (忘れ物)
- 僕の愛してるだれもいない
