= Nara (city) =

City in Nara prefecture, Japan

Nara 奈良市
- Prefecture capital and Core city
- Nara City
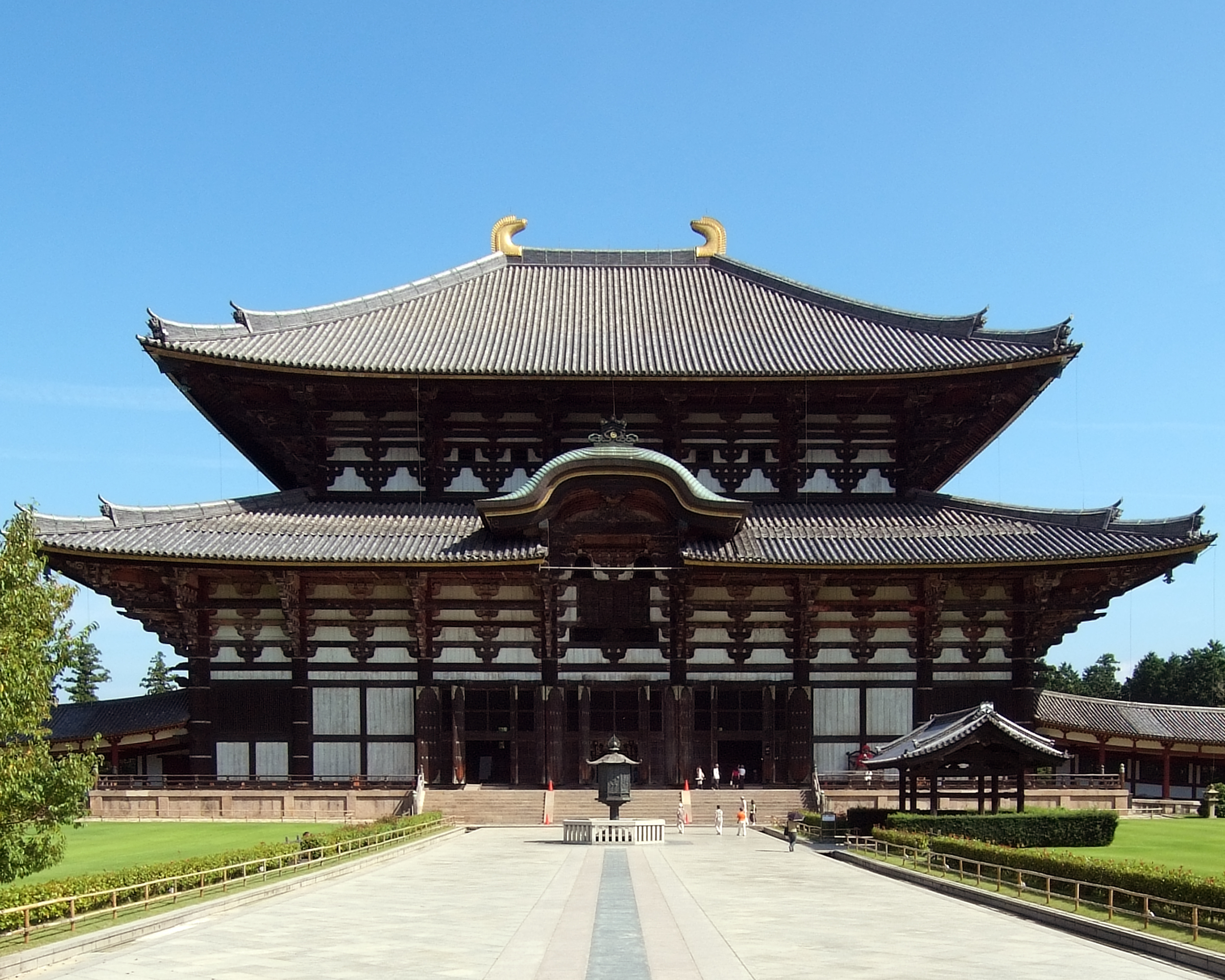
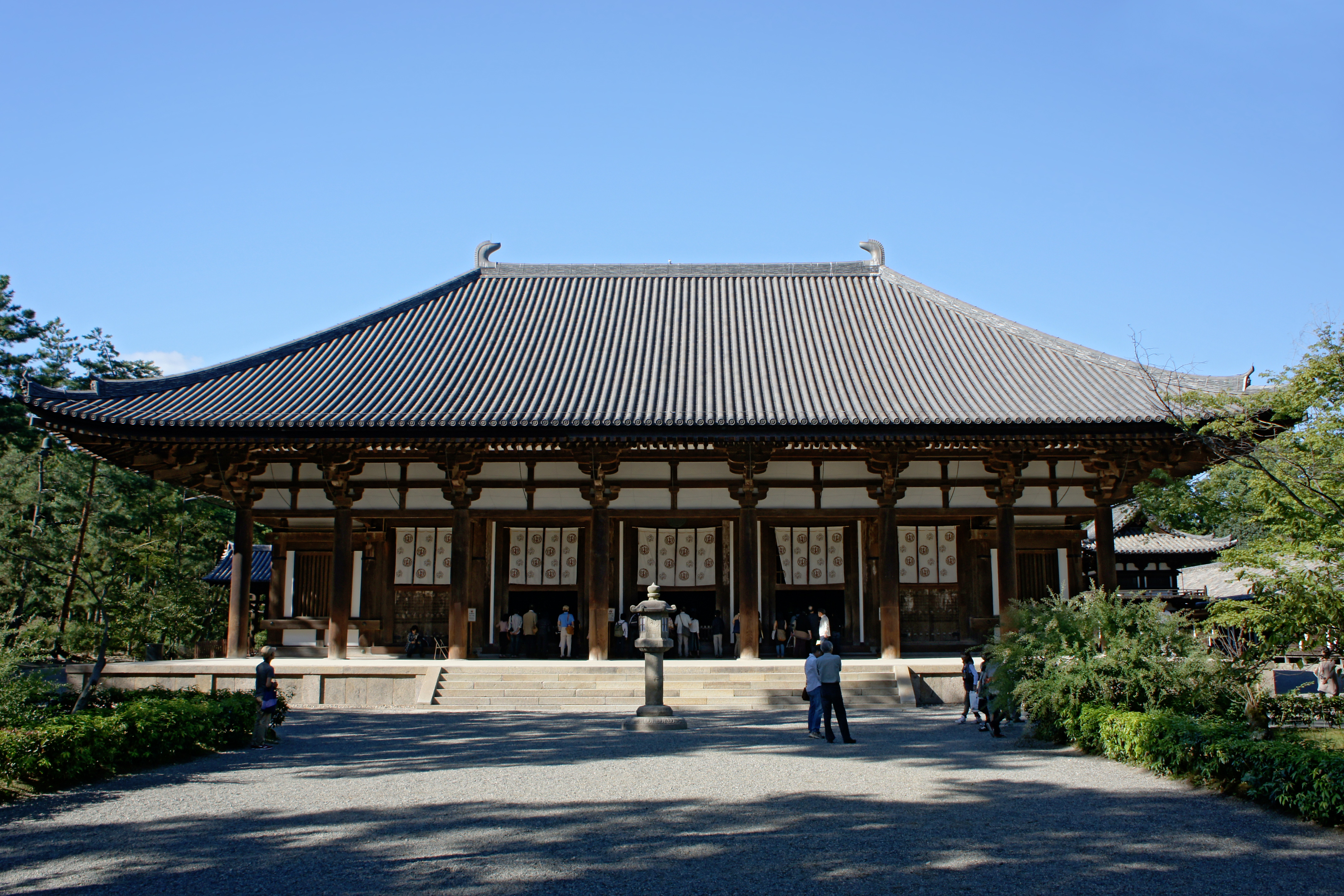
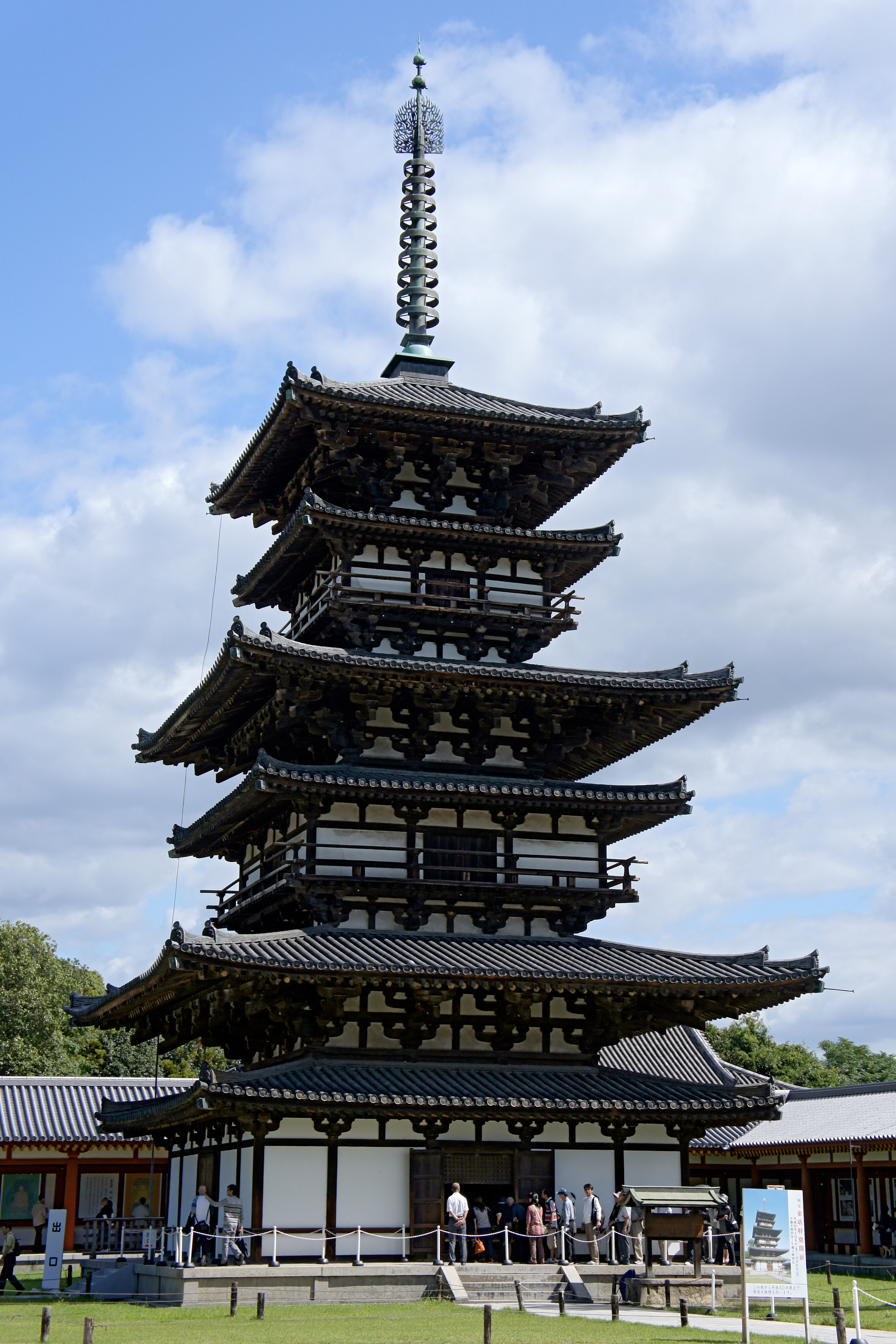
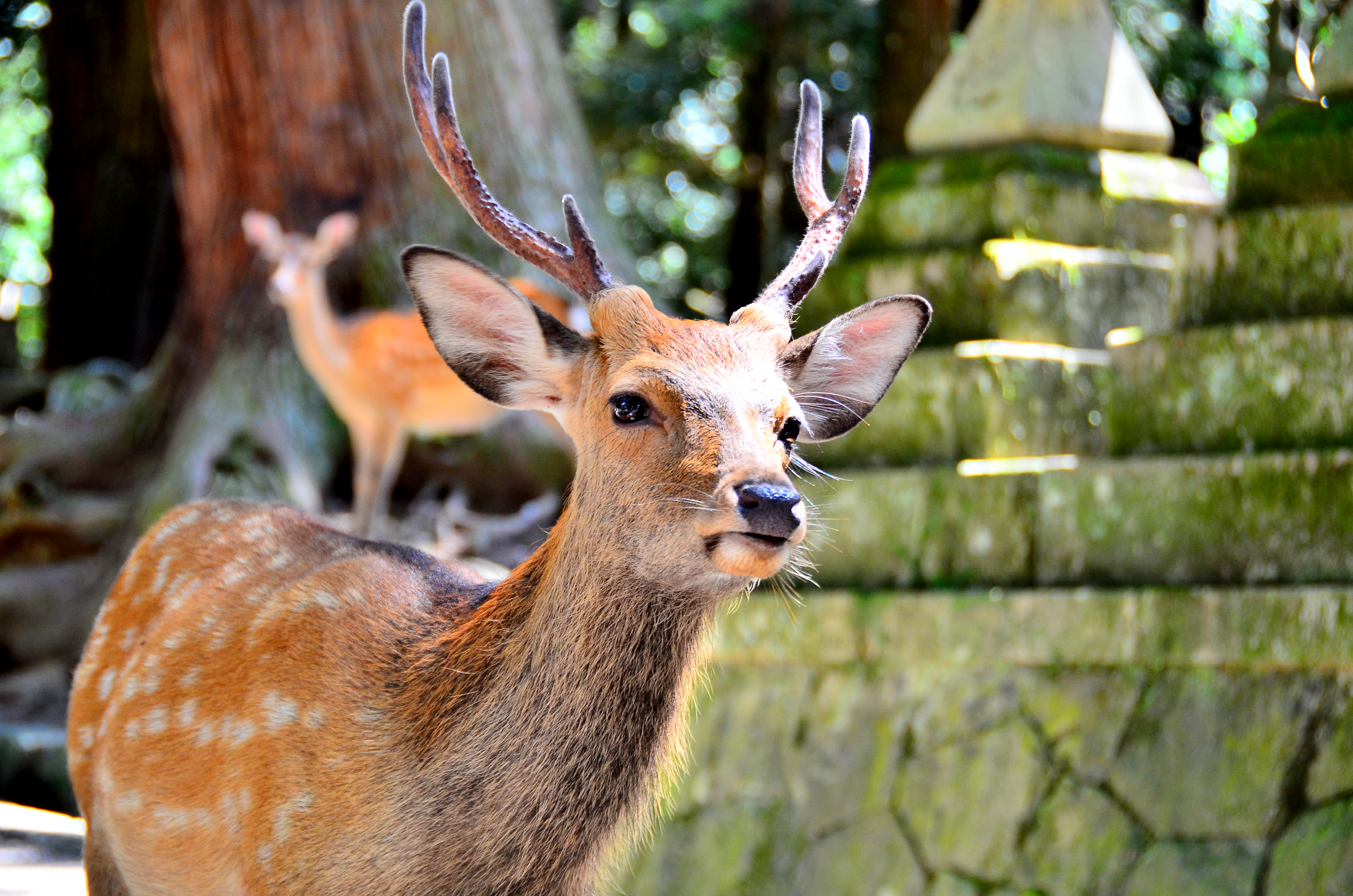
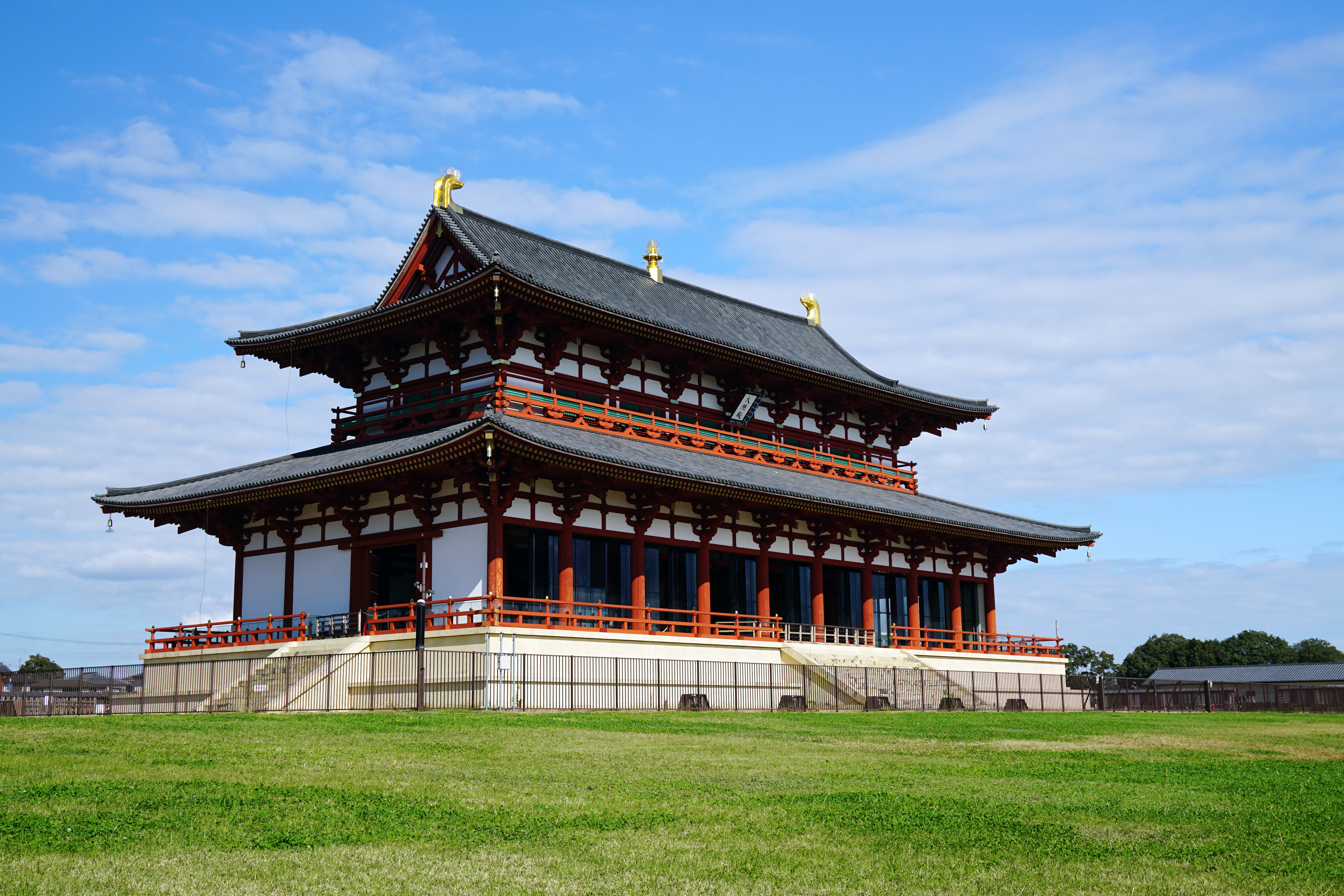
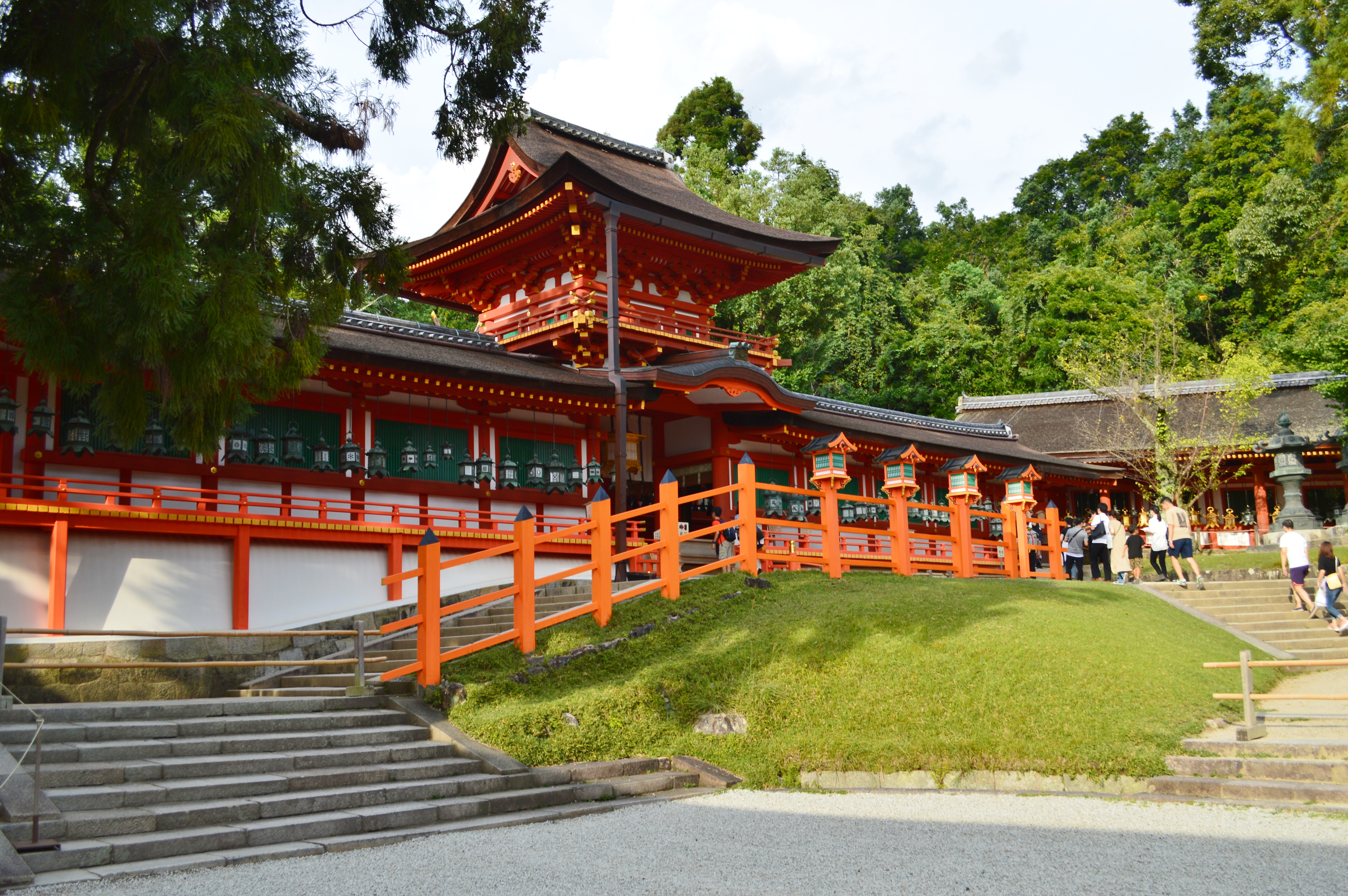
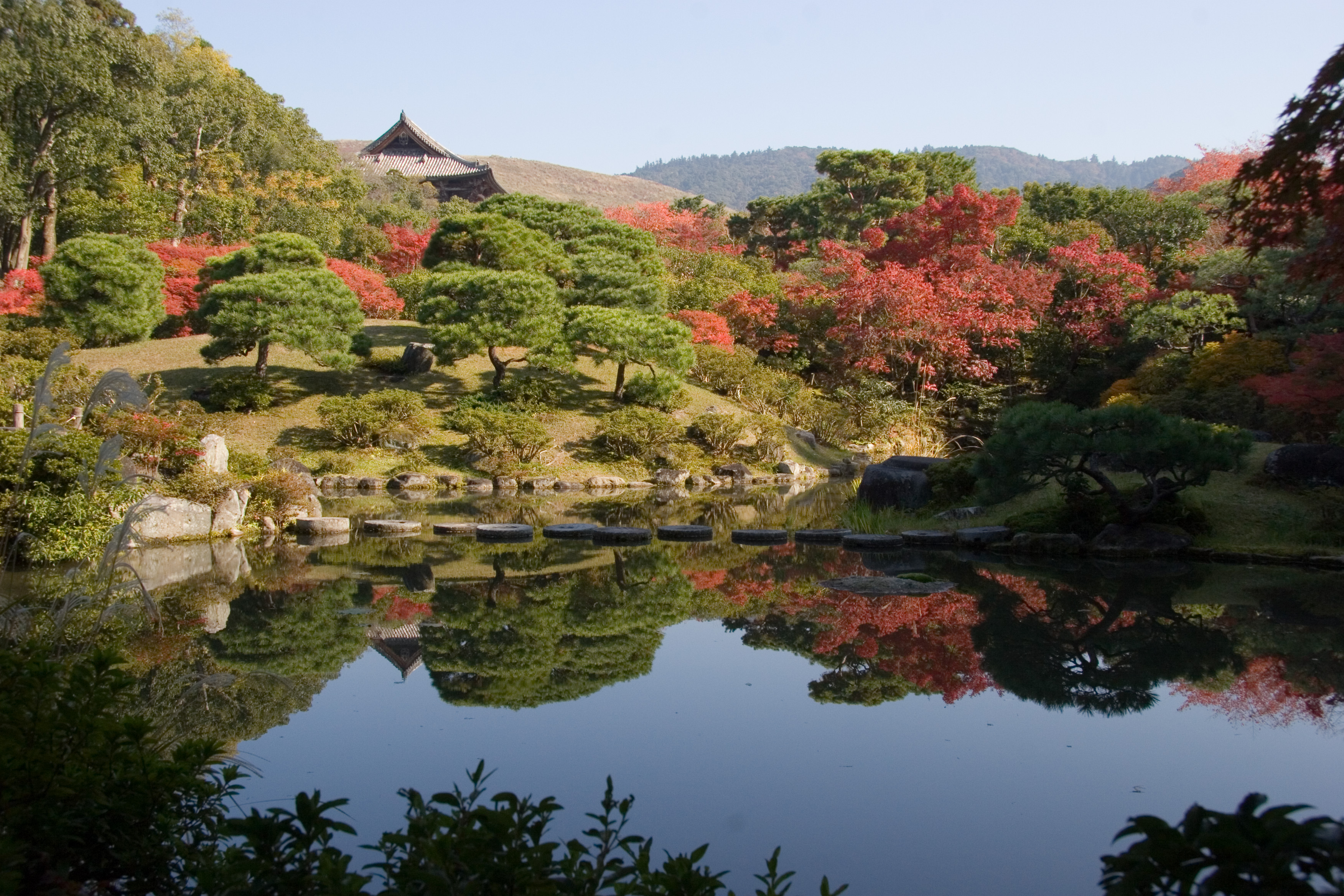
- Todai-ji Toshodai-ji Yakushi-ji A sika deer in Nara Park Heijo-kyo Kasuga-taisha Isui-en

- Flag Seal
- Location of Nara in Nara Prefecture

- Location in Japan
- Coordinates: 34°41′04″N 135°48′18″E
- Country: Japan
- Region: Kansai
- Prefecture: Nara Prefecture

Government
  - Mayor: Gen Nakagawa

Area
  - Total: 276.84 km^{2} (106.89 sq mi)

Population (2022)
  - Total: 367,353
  - Density: 1,327.0/km^{2} (3,436.8/sq mi)
- Time zone: UTC+09:00 (JST)
- City hall address: 1-1-1 Nijō-ōji, Nara-shi, Nara-ken; 630-8580
- Website: City of Nara
- Symbols
- Bird: Japanese bush warbler
- Flower: Nara yaezakura
- Tree: Quercus gilva

UNESCO World Heritage Site

UNESCO World Heritage Site
- Official name: Historic Monuments of Ancient Nara
- Includes: 1. Tôdai-ji; 2. Kôfuku-ji; 3. Kasuga-Taisha and Kasugayama Primeval Forest; 4. Gangô-ji; 5. Yakushi-ji; 6. Tôshôdai-ji; 7. Nara Palace Site
- Criteria: Cultural: (ii)(iii)(iv)(vi)
- Reference: 870
- Inscription: 1998 (22nd Session)
- Area: 617 ha (1,520 acres)
- Buffer zone: 1,962.5 ha (4,849 acres)

Nara (奈良市, Nara-shi; [nä́.ɾä̀, nä̀.ɾä́.ɕì]) is the capital city of Nara Prefecture, Japan. As of 2022, Nara has an estimated population of 367,353 according to World Population Review, making it the largest city in Nara Prefecture and sixth-largest in the Kansai region of Honshu. Nara is a core city located in the northern part of Nara Prefecture bordering the Kyoto Prefecture.

Nara was the capital of Japan during the Nara period from 710 to 784 as the seat of the Emperor before the capital was moved to Nagaoka-kyō, except for the years 740 to 745, when the capital was placed in Kuni-kyō, Naniwa-kyō and Shigaraki Palace. Nara is home to eight major historic temples, shrines, and heritage sites, specifically Tōdai-ji, Saidai-ji, Kōfuku-ji, Kasuga Shrine, Gangō-ji, Yakushi-ji, Tōshōdai-ji, and the Heijō Palace, together with Kasugayama Primeval Forest, collectively form the Historic Monuments of Ancient Nara, a UNESCO World Heritage Site.

== Etymology ==
By the Heian period, a variety of different characters had been used to represent the name Nara: 乃楽, 乃羅, 平, 平城, 名良, 奈良, 奈羅, 常, 那良, 那楽, 那羅, 楢, 諾良, 諾楽, 寧, 寧楽 and 儺羅.

A number of theories for the origin of the name "Nara" have been proposed, and some of the better-known ones are listed here. The second theory in the list, from the notable folklorist Kunio Yanagita (1875–1962), is most widely accepted at present.

- The Nihon Shoki (The Chronicles of Japan, the second oldest book of classical Japanese history) suggests that "Nara" was derived from narasu (to flatten, to level). According to this account, in September in the tenth year of Emperor Sujin, "leading selected soldiers (the rebels) went forward, climbed Nara-yama (hills lying to the north of Heijō-kyō) and put them in order. Now the imperial forces gathered and flattened trees and plants. Therefore the mountain is called Nara-yama." Though the narrative itself is regarded as a folk etymology and few researchers regard it as historical, this is the oldest surviving suggestion, and is linguistically similar to the following theory by Yanagita.
- "Flat land" theory (currently most widely accepted): In his 1936 study of placenames, the author Kunio Yanagita states that "the topographical feature of an area of relatively gentle gradient on the side of a mountain, which is called taira in eastern Japan and hae in the south of Kyushu, is called naru in the Chūgoku region and Shikoku (central Japan). This word gives rise to the verb narasu, adverb narashi, and adjective narushi." This is supported by entries in a dialect dictionary for nouns referring to flat areas: naru (found in Aida District, Okayama Prefecture and Ketaka District, Tottori Prefecture) and naro (found in Kōchi Prefecture); and also by an adjective narui which is not standard Japanese, but is found all across central Japan, with meanings of "gentle", "gently sloping", or "easy". Yanagita further comments that the way in which the fact that so many of these placenames are written using the character 平 ("flat"), or other characters in which it is an element, demonstrates the validity of this theory. Citing a 1795 document, Inaba-shi (因幡志) from the province of Inaba, the eastern part of modern Tottori, as indicating the reading naruji for the word 平地 (standard reading heichi, meaning "level/flat ground/land/country, a plain"), Yanagita suggests that naruji would have been used as a common noun there until the modern period. Of course, the fact that historically "Nara" was also written 平 or 平城 as above is further support for this theory.
- The idea that Nara is derived from 楢 nara (Japanese for "oak, deciduous Quercus spp.") is the next most common opinion. This idea was suggested by a linguist, Yoshida Togo. This noun for the plant can be seen as early as in Man'yōshū (7–8th century) and Harima-no-kuni Fudoki (715). The latter book states the place name Narahara in Harima (around present-day Kasai) derives from this nara tree, which might support Yoshida's theory. Note that the name of the nearby city of Kashihara (literally "live oak plain") contains a semantically similar morpheme (Japanese 橿 kashi "live oak, evergreen Quercus spp.").
- Nara could be a loanword from Old Korean, related to Middle Korean narah and Modern Korean nara (나라: "country", "nation", "kingdom"). This idea was put forward by the linguist Matsuoka Shizuo. American linguist Samuel E. Martin notes that the earliest attestation of this word in Korean sources—given in an eighth-century hyangga text, in the phonogramic form 國惡—should be read as NAL[A-]ak. This is similar to the form implied by the Old Japanese writings of Nara that transcribe the second syllable with 楽 (raku), and Martin notes that the city name has been "long suspected of being a borrowing from the Korean word". Kusuhara et al. argues that this hypothesis cannot account for the fact there are many places named Nara, Naru and Naro besides this Nara.
- There is the idea that Nara is akin to Tungusic na. In some Tungusic languages such as Orok, na means earth, land or the like. Some have speculated about a connection between these Tungusic words and Old Japanese nawi, an archaic and somewhat obscure word that appears in the verb phrases nawi furu and nawi yoru ('an earthquake occurs, to have an earthquake').

The "flat land" theory is adopted by Nihon Kokugo Daijiten (the largest dictionary of Japanese language), various dictionaries for place names, history books on Nara, and the like today, and it is regarded as the most likely.

== History ==
=== Pre-Nara and origins ===
There are a number of megalithic tombs or kofun in Nara, including Gosashi Kofun, Hishiage Kofun (ヒシアゲ古墳), Horaisan Kofun (宝来山古墳), Konabe Kofun (コナベ古墳), Saki Ishizukayama Kofun (佐紀石塚山古墳), Saki Misasagiyama Kofun (佐紀陵山古墳), and Uwanabe Kofun (ウワナベ古墳).

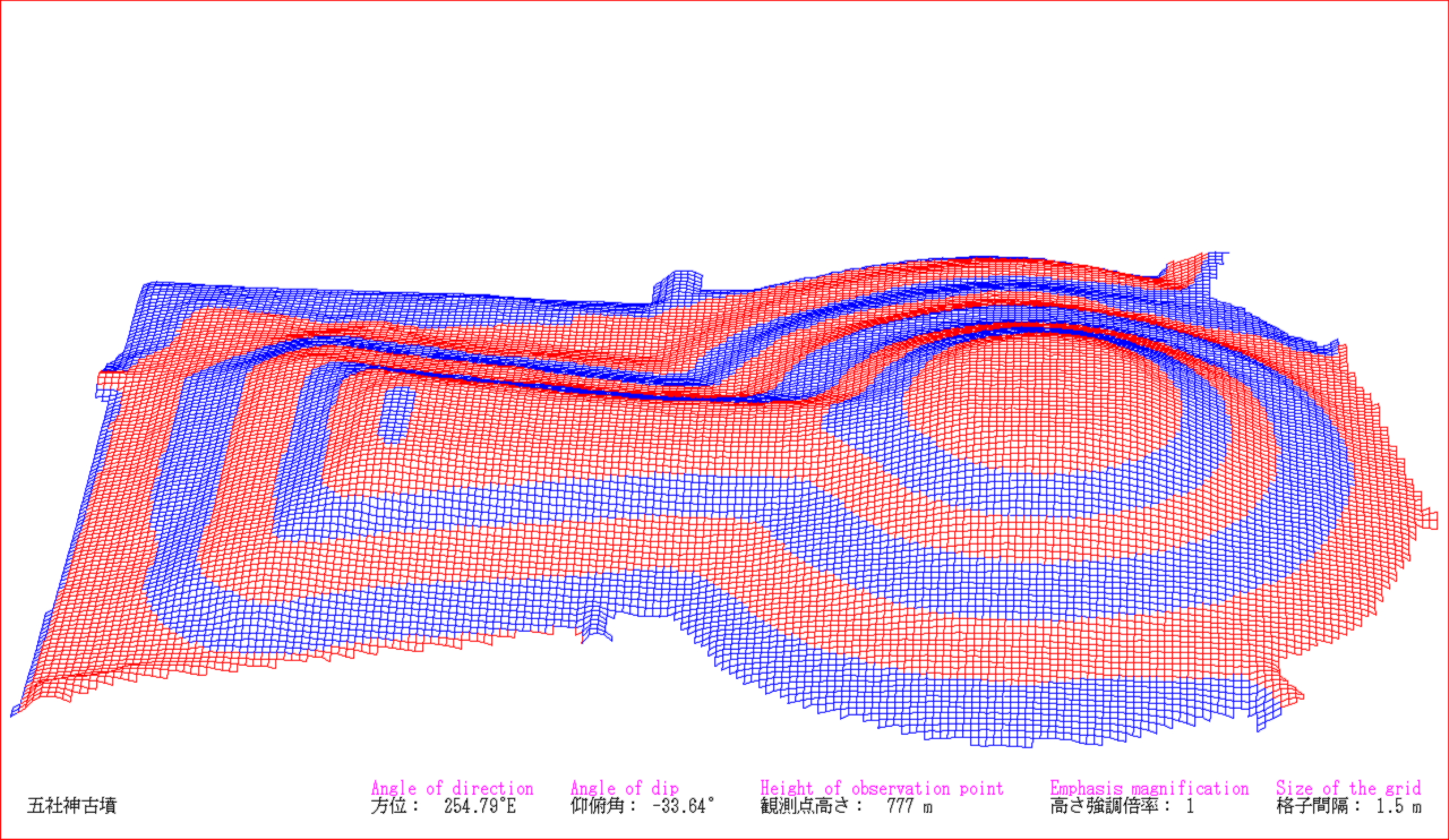
Gosashi tomb

By decree of an edict on March 11, 708 AD, Empress Genmei ordered the court to relocate to the new capital, Nara. Once known as Heijō or Heijō-kyō, the city was established as Japan's first permanent capital in 710 CE; it was the seat of government until 784 CE, albeit with a five-year interruption, lasting from 740 to 745 CE. Heijō, as the ‘penultimate court’, however, was abandoned by the order of Emperor Kammu in 784 CE in favor of the temporary site of Nagaoka, and then Heian-kyō (Kyoto) which retained the status of capital for 1,100 years, until the Meiji Emperor made the final move to Edo in 1869 CE. This first relocation was due to the court's transformation from an imperial nobility to a force of metropolitan elites and new technique of dynastic shedding which had refashioned the relationship between court, nobility, and country. Moreover, the ancient capital lent its name to Nara period.

As a reactionary expression to the political centralization of China, the city of Nara (Heijō) was modeled after the Tang capital at Chang’an. Nara was laid out on a grid—which was based upon the Handen system—whereby the city was divided by four great roads. Likewise, according to Chinese cosmology, the ruler's place was fixed like the pole star. By dominating the capital, the ruler brought heaven to earth. Thus, the south-facing palace centered at the north, bisected the ancient city, instituting ‘Right Capital’ and ‘Left Capital’ zones. As Nara came to be a center of Buddhism in Japan and a prominent pilgrimage site, the city plan incorporated various pre-Heijō and Heijō period temples, of which the Yakushiji and the Todaiji still stand.

=== Politics ===
A number of scholars have characterized the Nara period as a time of penal and administrative legal order. The Taihō Code called for the establishment of administrative sects underneath the central government, and modeled many of the codes from the Chinese Tang dynasty. The code eventually disbanded, but its contents were largely preserved in the Yōrō Code of 718.

Occupants of the throne during the period gradually shifted their focus from military preparation to religious rites and institutions, in an attempt to strengthen their divine authority over the population.

=== Religion and temples ===
- Nanto Rokushū

With the establishment of the new capital, Asuka-dera, the temple of the Soga clan, was relocated within Nara. The Emperor Shōmu ordered the construction of Tōdai-ji Temple (largest wooden building in the world) and the world's largest bronze Buddha statue. The temples of Nara, known collectively as the Nanto Shichi Daiji, remained spiritually significant even beyond the move of the political capital to Heian-kyō in 794, thus giving Nara a synonym of Nanto (南都 "the southern capital").

On 2 December 724 AD, in order to increase the visual "magnificence" of the city, an edict was ordered by the government for the noblemen and the wealthy to renovate the roofs, pillars, and walls of their homes, although at that time this was unfeasible.

Sightseeing in Nara city became popular in the Edo period, during which several visitors' maps of Nara were widely published. During the Meiji Period, the Kofukuji Temple lost some land and its monks were converted into Shinto priests, due to Buddhism being associated with the old shogunate.

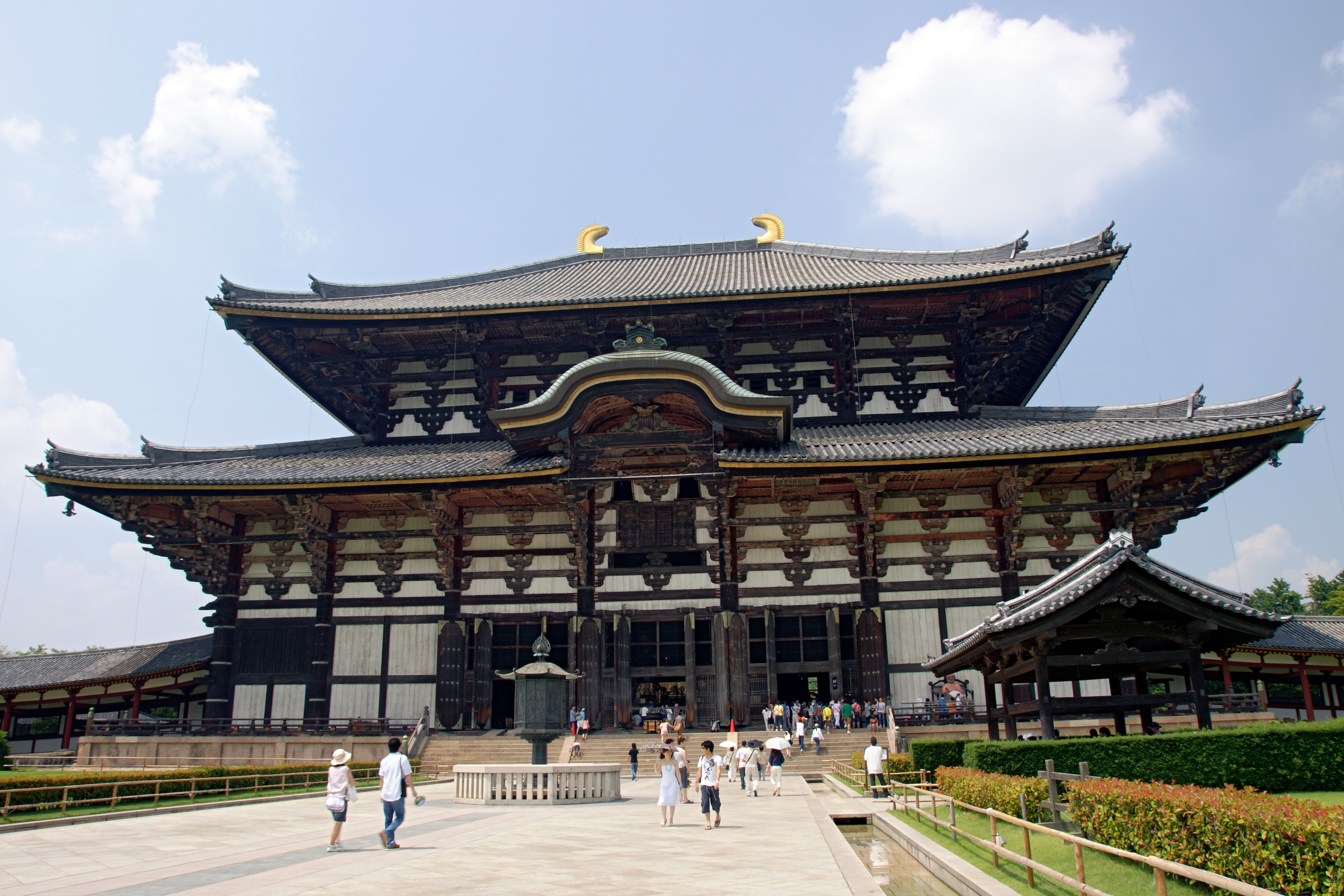
Tōdai-ji is a Buddhist temple and the world's largest wooden building (8th century).

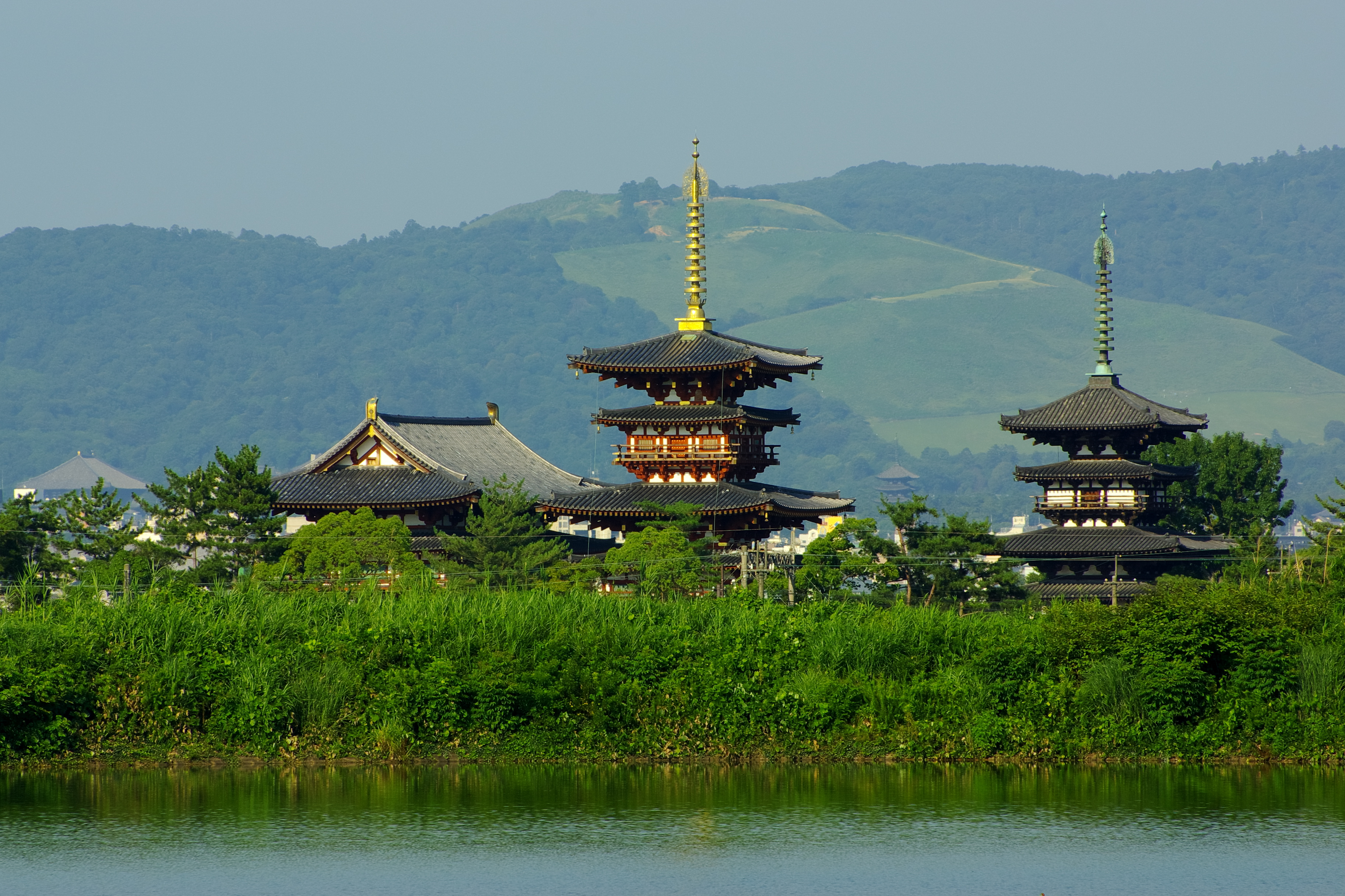
Yakushi-ji was completed in 680.

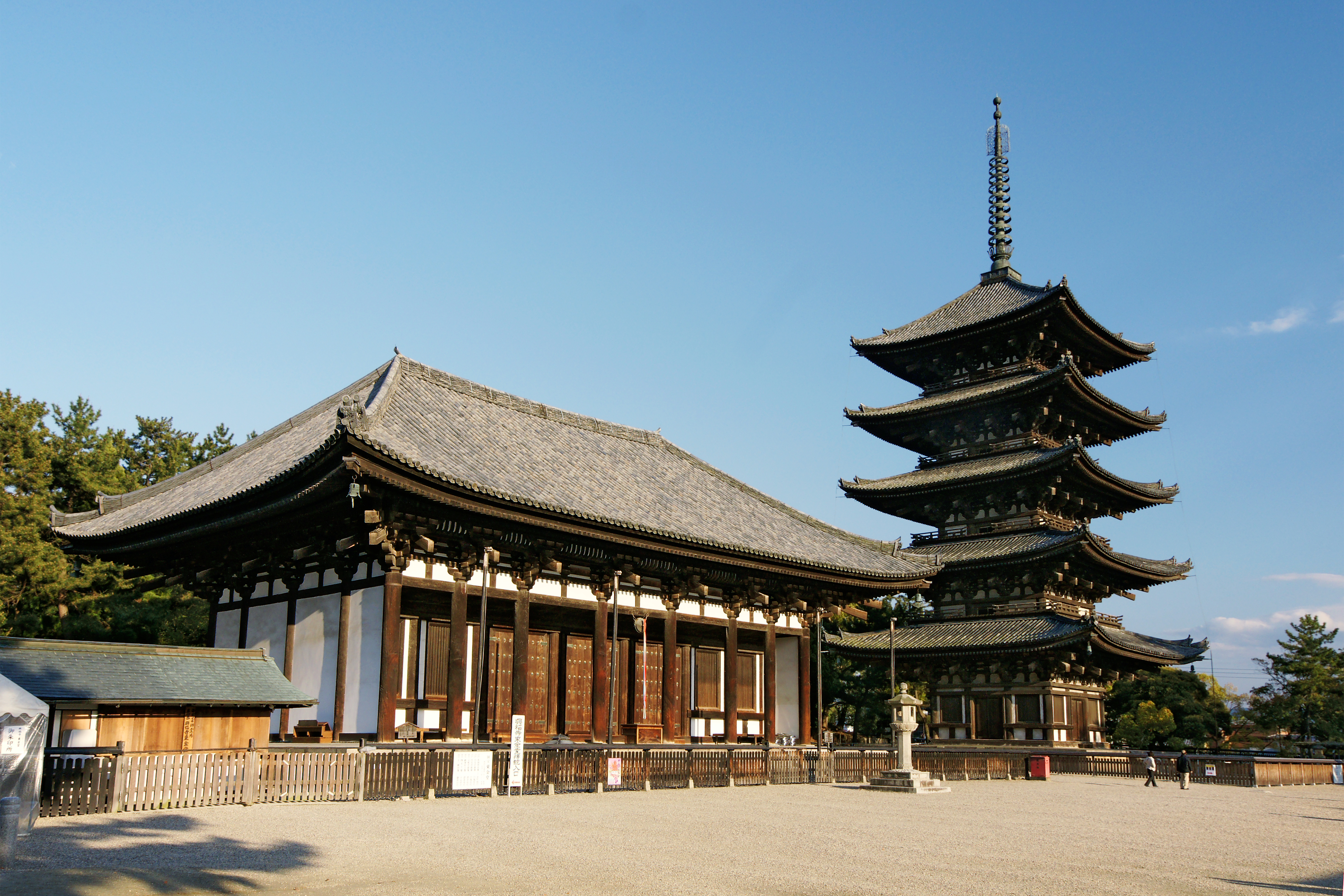
Kōfuku-ji was built in 669.

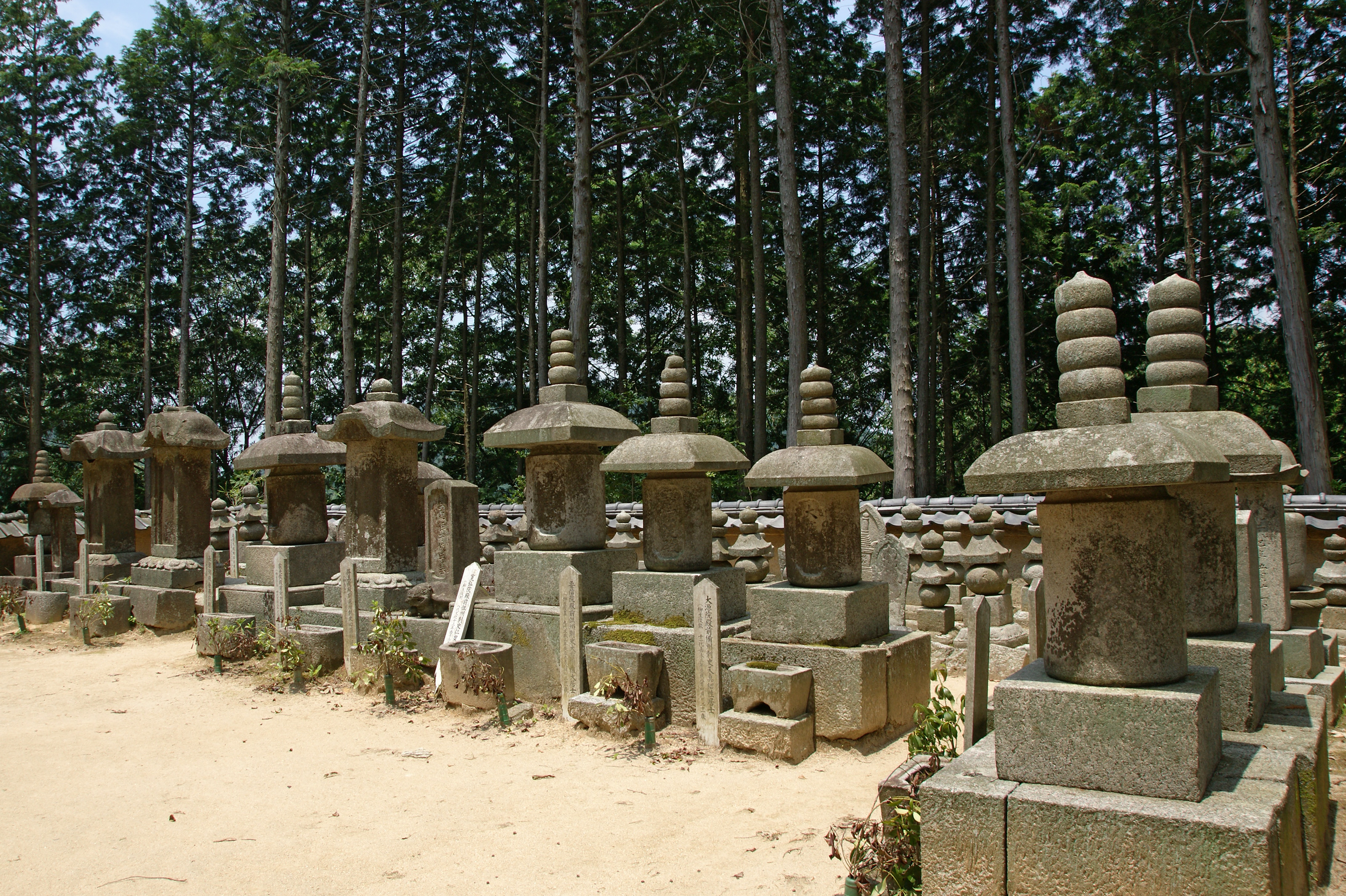
Houtokuji (Yagyu Clan Tomb)

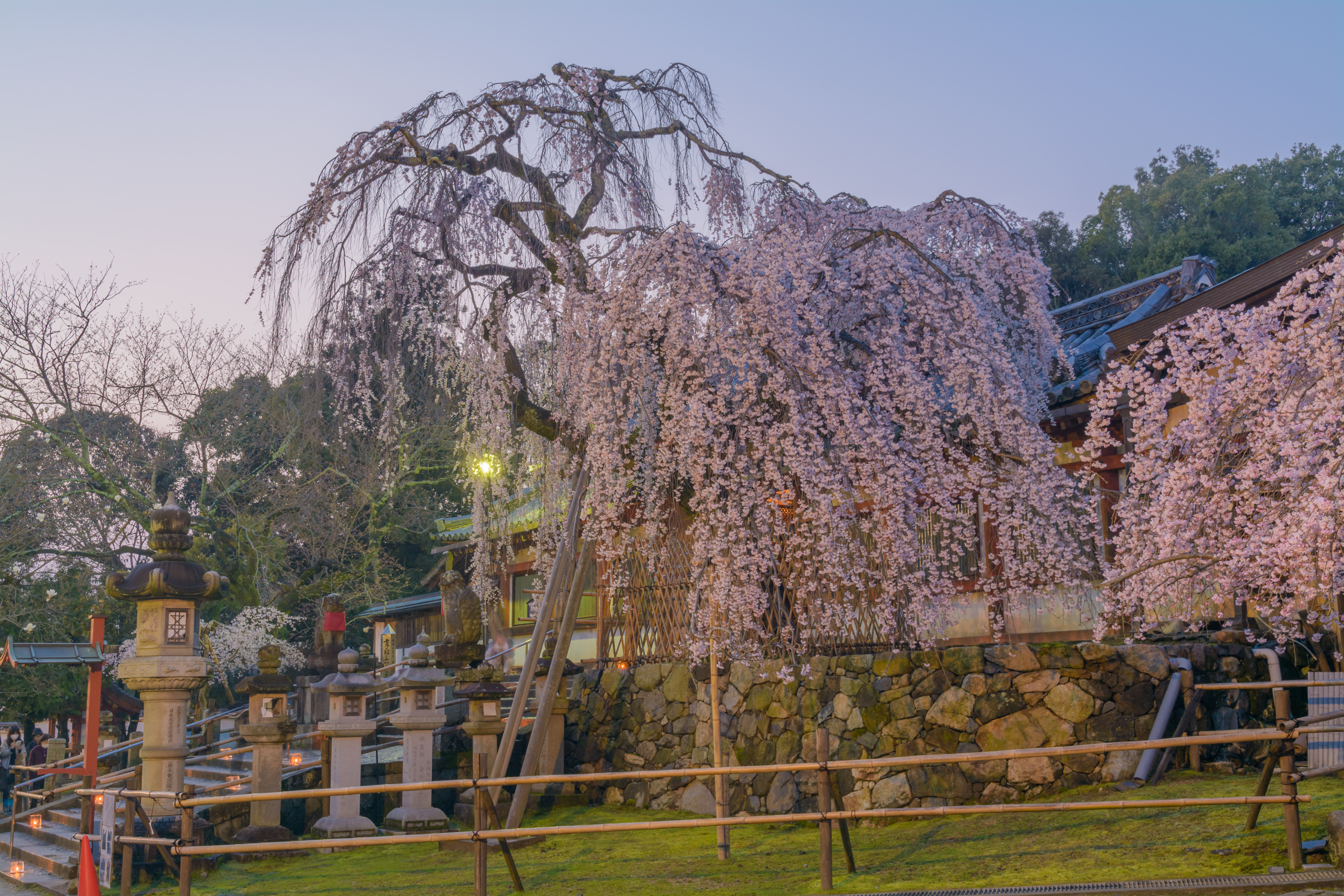
Himuro Shrine, established in 710

=== Modern Nara ===
Although Nara was the capital of Japan from 710 to 794, it was not designated a city until 1 February 1898. Nara has since developed from a town of commerce in the Edo and Meiji periods to a modern tourist city, due to its large number of historical temples, landmarks and national monuments. Nara was added to the UNESCO World Heritage Sites list in December 1998. The architecture of some shops, ryokans and art galleries has been adapted from traditional merchant houses.

Nara holds traditional festivals every year, including the Neri-Kuyo Eshiki, a spring festival held in Todaiji temple for over 1,000 years; and the Kemari Festival, in which people wear costumes ranging across 700 years and play traditional games).

In 1909, Tatsuno Kingo designed the Nara Hotel, whose architecture combined modern elements with traditional Japanese style.

At a 2022 campaign event in Nara, former Prime Minister of Japan Shinzo Abe was shot and killed with a homemade firearm by Tetsuya Yamagami, who resented Abe's ties to the Unification Church.

== Geography ==
The city of Nara lies in the northern end of Nara Prefecture, directly bordering Kyoto Prefecture to its north. The city is 22.22 km (13.81 mi) from North to South, from East to West. As a result of the latest merger, effective April 1, 2005, that combined the villages of Tsuge and Tsukigase with the city of Nara, the city now borders Mie Prefecture directly to its east. The total area is 276.84 km^{2} (106.89 sq mi).

Nara city, as well as several important settlements (such as Kashihara, Yamatokōriyama, Tenri, Yamatotakada, Sakurai and Gose), are located in the Nara Basin. This makes it the most densely populated region of Nara Prefecture.

The downtown of Nara is on the east side of the ancient Heijō Palace site, occupying the northern part of what was called the Gekyō (外京), literally the outer capital area. Many of the public offices (e.g. the Municipal office, the Nara Prefectural government, the Nara Police headquarters, etc.) are located on Nijō-ōji (二条大路), while Nara branch offices of major nationwide banks are on Sanjō-ōji (三条大路), with both avenues running east–west.

The highest point in the city is at the peak of Kaigahira-yama at an altitude of 822.0 m (2,696.85 ft) (Tsugehayama-cho district), and the lowest is in Ikeda-cho district, with an altitude of 56.4 m (185.04 ft).

=== Climate ===
The climate of Nara Prefecture is generally temperate, although there are notable differences between the north-western basin area and the rest of the prefecture which is more mountainous.

The basin area climate has an inland characteristic, as represented in the higher daily temperature variance, and the difference between summer and winter temperatures. Winter temperatures average approximately 3 to 5 °C (37 to 41 °F), and from 25 to 28 °C (77 to 82 °F) in the summer with highest readings reaching close to 35 °C (95 °F). There has not been a single year since 1990 with more than 10 days of snowfall recorded by Nara Local Meteorological Observatory.

The climate in the rest of the prefecture is that of higher elevations especially in the south, with −5 °C (23 °F) being the extreme minimum in winter. Heavy rainfall is often observed in summer. The annual accumulated rainfall totals as much as 3,000 to 5,000 mm (118.11 to 196.85 in), which is among the heaviest in Japan and indeed in the world outside the equatorial zone.

Spring and fall temperatures are temperate and comfortable. The mountainous region of Yoshino has been long popular for viewing cherry blossoms in the spring. In autumn, the southern mountains are also a popular destination for viewing fall foliage.

Climate data for Nara (1991–2020 normals, extremes 1953–present)
| Month | Jan | Feb | Mar | Apr | May | Jun | Jul | Aug | Sep | Oct | Nov | Dec | Year |
|---|---|---|---|---|---|---|---|---|---|---|---|---|---|
| Record high °C (°F) | 18.9 (66.0) | 23.9 (75.0) | 26.4 (79.5) | 30.5 (86.9) | 33.6 (92.5) | 36.5 (97.7) | 38.3 (100.9) | 39.3 (102.7) | 37.4 (99.3) | 32.0 (89.6) | 27.5 (81.5) | 24.9 (76.8) | 39.3 (102.7) |
| Mean maximum °C (°F) | 14.4 (57.9) | 17.5 (63.5) | 22.1 (71.8) | 27.2 (81.0) | 30.6 (87.1) | 32.8 (91.0) | 35.6 (96.1) | 36.3 (97.3) | 33.6 (92.5) | 28.9 (84.0) | 22.7 (72.9) | 17.3 (63.1) | 36.5 (97.7) |
| Mean daily maximum °C (°F) | 9.0 (48.2) | 10.0 (50.0) | 14.0 (57.2) | 20.0 (68.0) | 24.7 (76.5) | 27.4 (81.3) | 31.3 (88.3) | 33.0 (91.4) | 28.5 (83.3) | 22.6 (72.7) | 16.8 (62.2) | 11.4 (52.5) | 20.7 (69.3) |
| Daily mean °C (°F) | 4.2 (39.6) | 4.7 (40.5) | 8.0 (46.4) | 13.5 (56.3) | 18.5 (65.3) | 22.2 (72.0) | 26.2 (79.2) | 27.3 (81.1) | 23.2 (73.8) | 17.2 (63.0) | 11.4 (52.5) | 6.4 (43.5) | 15.2 (59.4) |
| Mean daily minimum °C (°F) | 0.1 (32.2) | 0.1 (32.2) | 2.7 (36.9) | 7.7 (45.9) | 13.0 (55.4) | 17.9 (64.2) | 22.2 (72.0) | 23.0 (73.4) | 19.1 (66.4) | 12.8 (55.0) | 6.8 (44.2) | 2.2 (36.0) | 10.6 (51.1) |
| Mean minimum °C (°F) | −3.4 (25.9) | −3.6 (25.5) | −2.2 (28.0) | 0.8 (33.4) | 6.6 (43.9) | 12.5 (54.5) | 18.4 (65.1) | 18.9 (66.0) | 13.0 (55.4) | 6.5 (43.7) | 1.3 (34.3) | −2.0 (28.4) | −4.0 (24.8) |
| Record low °C (°F) | −7.0 (19.4) | −7.8 (18.0) | −5.0 (23.0) | −2.4 (27.7) | 1.4 (34.5) | 7.3 (45.1) | 12.2 (54.0) | 12.8 (55.0) | 7.7 (45.9) | 2.3 (36.1) | −2.6 (27.3) | −6.6 (20.1) | −7.8 (18.0) |
| Average precipitation mm (inches) | 52.4 (2.06) | 63.1 (2.48) | 105.1 (4.14) | 98.9 (3.89) | 138.5 (5.45) | 184.1 (7.25) | 173.5 (6.83) | 127.9 (5.04) | 159.0 (6.26) | 134.7 (5.30) | 71.2 (2.80) | 56.8 (2.24) | 1,365.1 (53.74) |
| Average snowfall cm (inches) | 1 (0.4) | 3 (1.2) | 0 (0) | 0 (0) | 0 (0) | 0 (0) | 0 (0) | 0 (0) | 0 (0) | 0 (0) | 0 (0) | 0 (0) | 5 (2.0) |
| Average precipitation days (≥ 0.5 mm) | 7.6 | 8.2 | 11.2 | 10.6 | 10.8 | 13.0 | 12.2 | 9.0 | 11.4 | 10.1 | 8.1 | 7.9 | 120.1 |
| Average relative humidity (%) | 70 | 69 | 67 | 65 | 68 | 75 | 76 | 73 | 76 | 77 | 76 | 73 | 72 |
| Mean monthly sunshine hours | 115.2 | 116.8 | 156.4 | 179.0 | 189.5 | 136.6 | 158.8 | 204.4 | 152.8 | 152.1 | 135.1 | 124.4 | 1,821.1 |
Source: Japan Meteorological Agency

== Cityscape ==
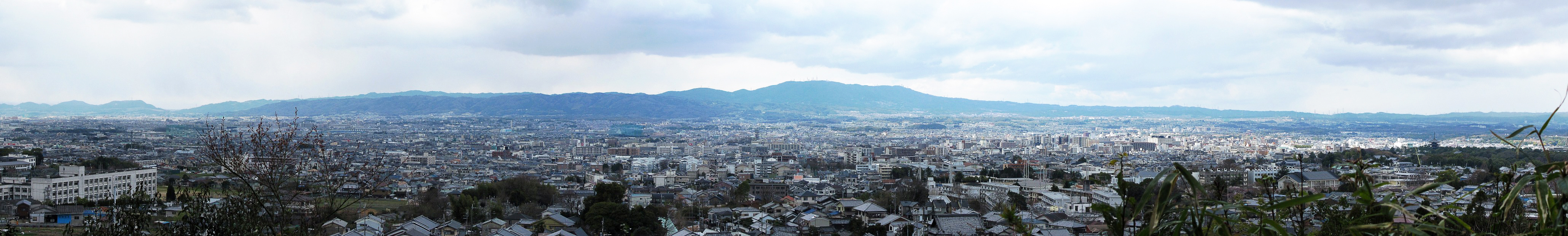
Nara city in Nara Basin viewed from Byakugō-ji

== Demographics ==
As of April 1, 2017, the city had an estimated population of 359,666 and a population density of 1,300 persons per km^{2}. There were 160,242 households residing in Nara. The highest concentration of both households and population, respectively about 46,000 and 125,000, is found along the newer bedtown districts, along the Kintetsu line connecting to Osaka.

There were about 3,000 registered foreigners in the city, of which Koreans and Chinese are the two largest groups with about 1,200 and 800 people respectively.

== Landmarks and culture ==
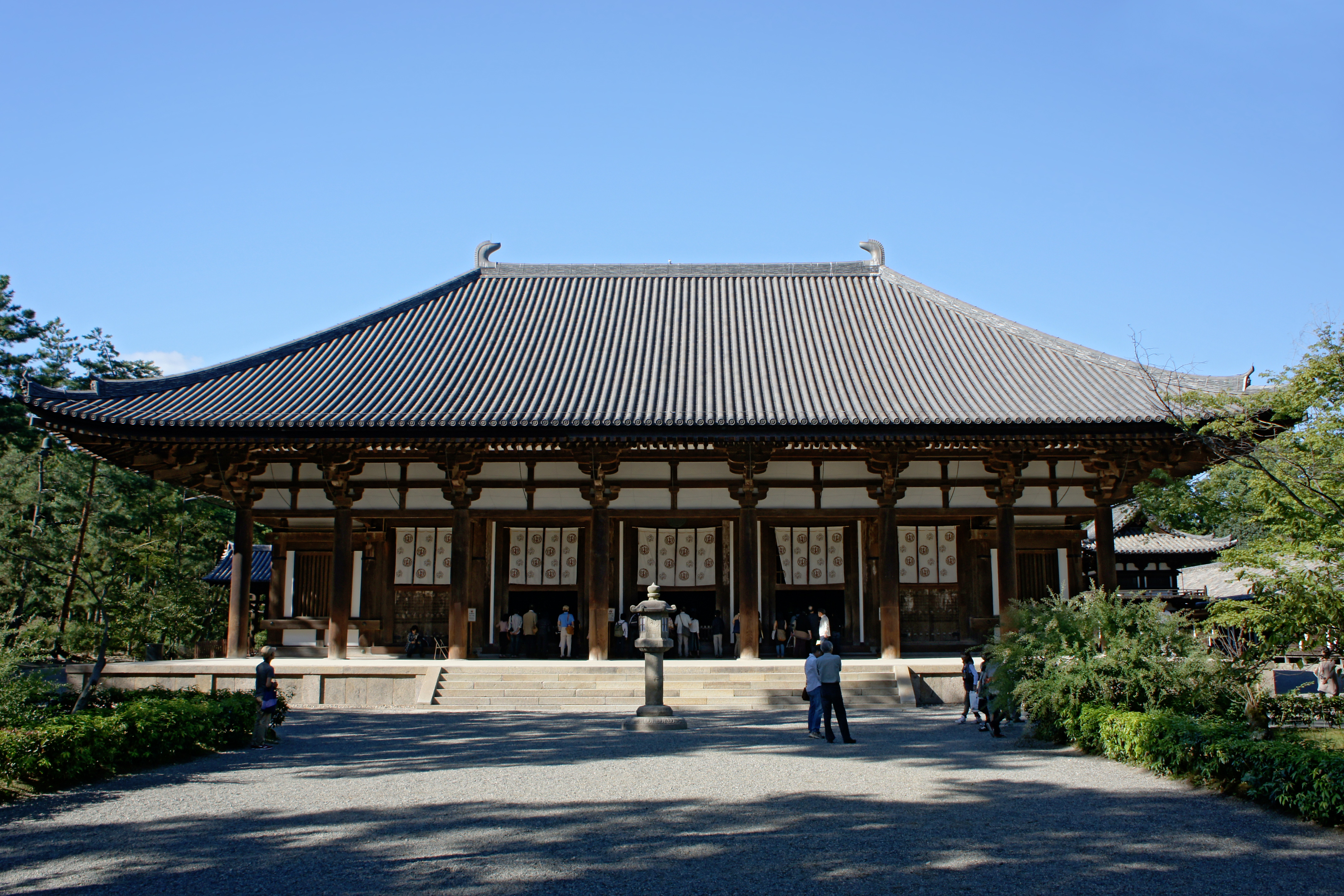
Tōshōdai-ji temple

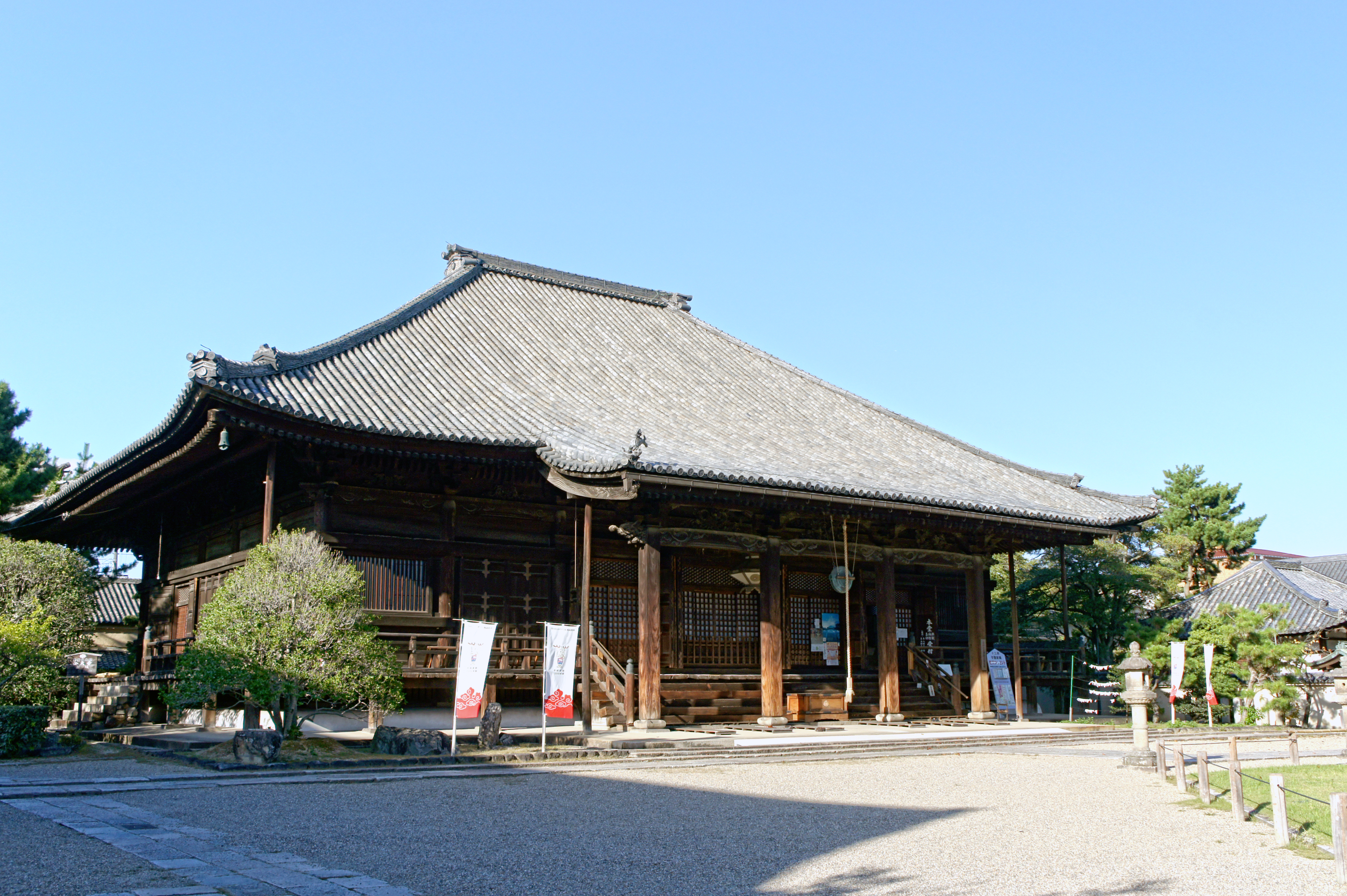
Saidai-ji main hall

=== Buddhist temples ===
- Akishino-dera
- Byakugō-ji
- Daian-ji
- Enjō-ji
- Enshō-ji
- Futai-ji
- Gangō-ji
- Hannya-ji
- Hokke-ji
- Kikō-ji
- Kōfuku-ji
- Ryōsen-ji
- Saidai-ji
- Shin-Yakushi-ji
- Shōryaku-ji
- Tōdai-ji, including Nigatsu-dō and Shōsōin
- Tōshōdai-ji
- Yakushi-ji

=== Shinto shrines ===
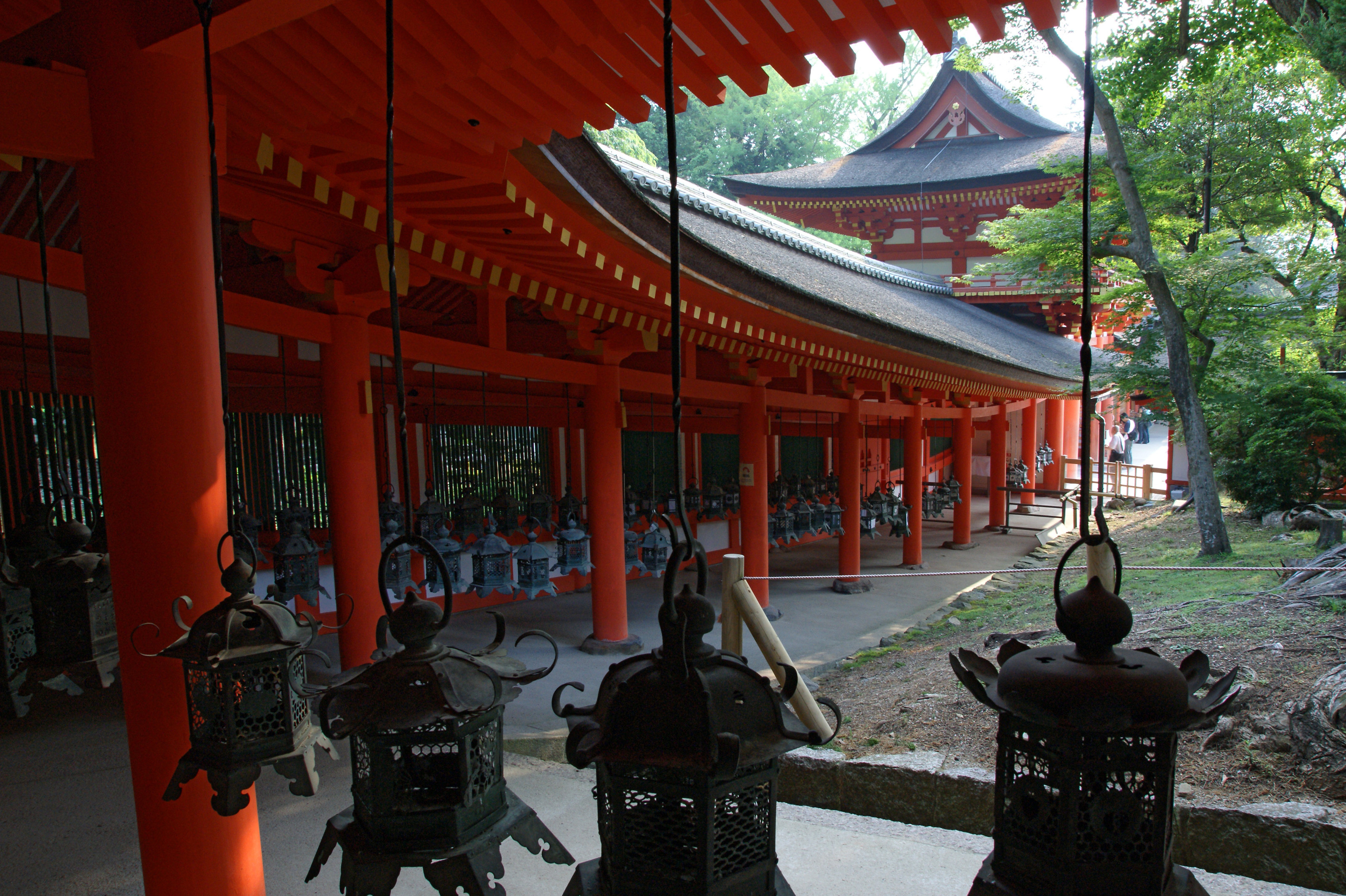
Kasuga Shrine

- Himuro Shrine
- Kasuga Shrine
- Tamukeyama Hachiman Shrine

=== Former imperial palace ===
- Heijō Palace

=== Museums ===
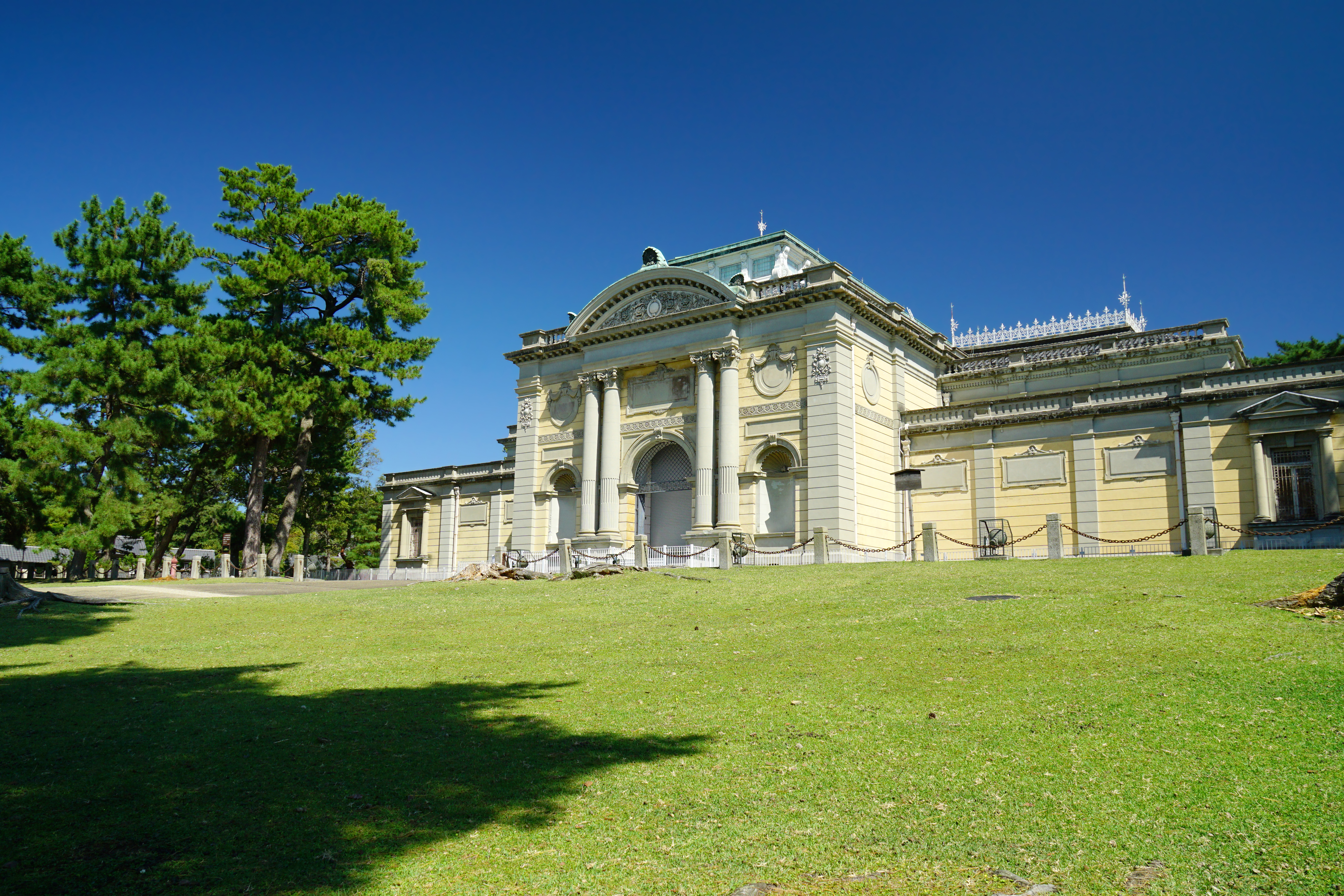
Nara National Museum

- Irie Taikichi Memorial Museum of Photography Nara City
- Nakano Museum of Art
- Nara City Historical Materials Preservation House
- Nara National Museum
- Nara Municipal Buried Cultural Properties Research Centre
- Nara Prefectural Museum of Art
- Neiraku Museum
- Shōhaku Art Museum
- Yamato Bunkakan

=== Gardens ===
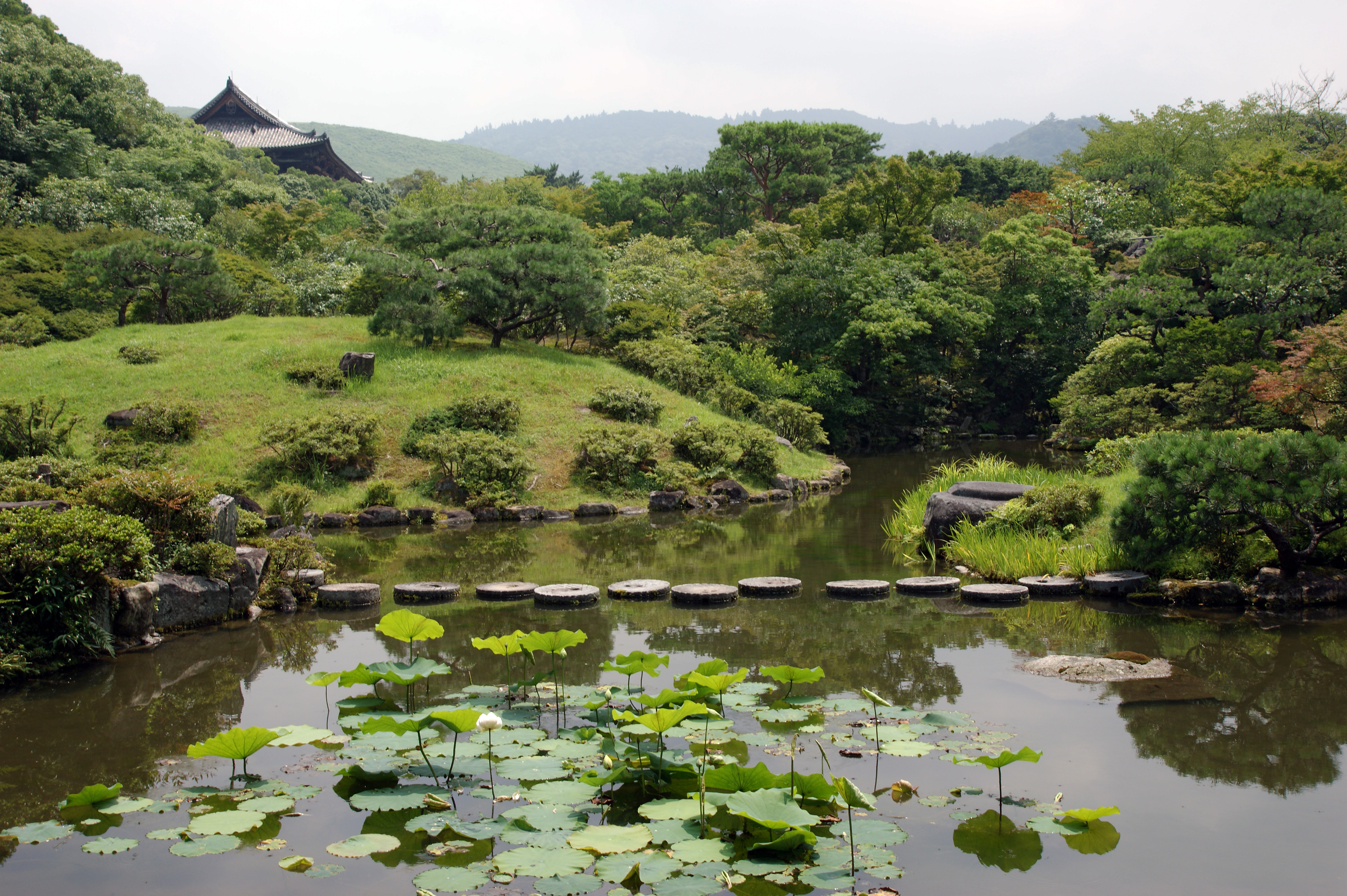
Isuien Garden

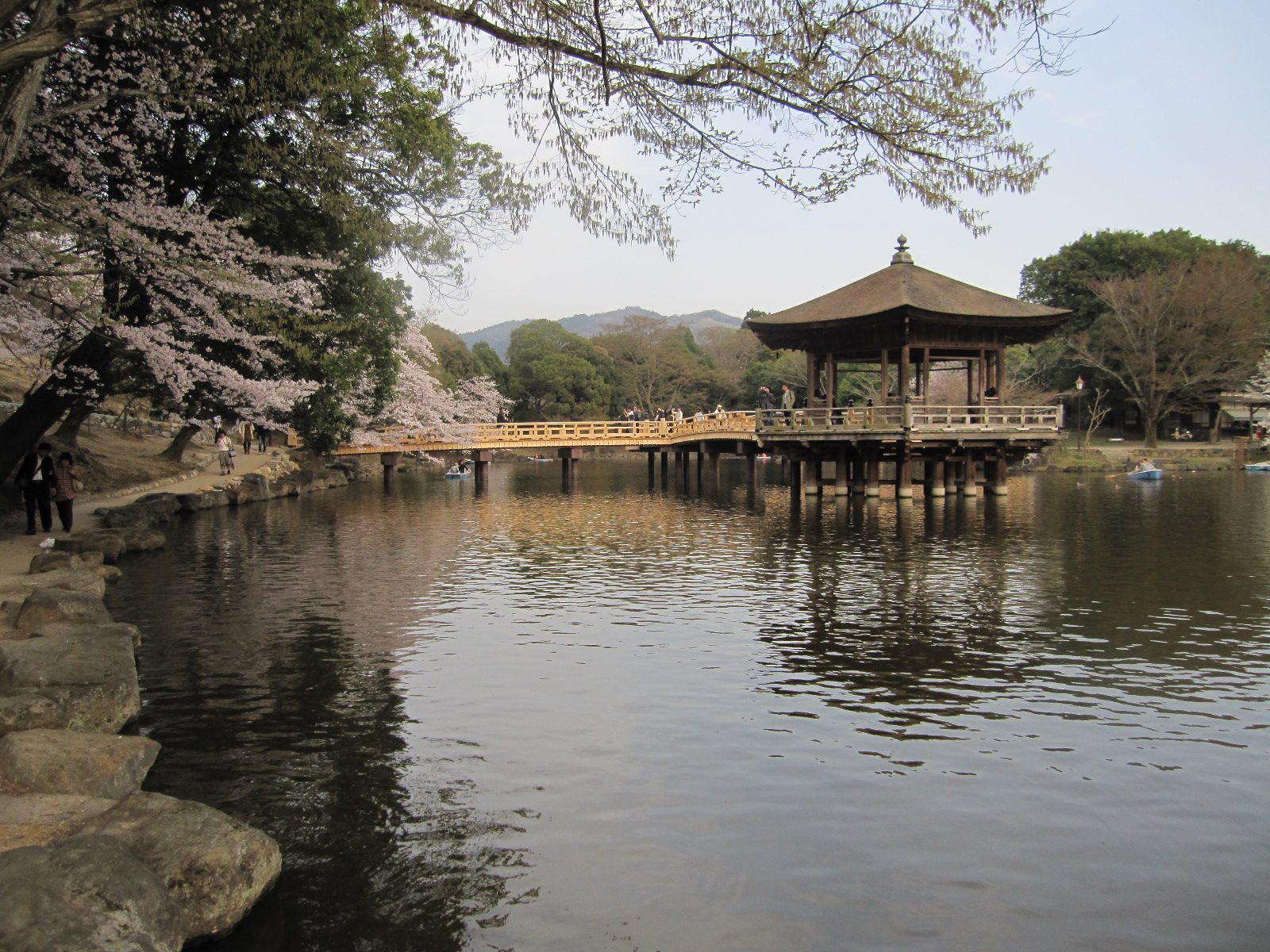
Ukimidou Pavilion in Nara Park

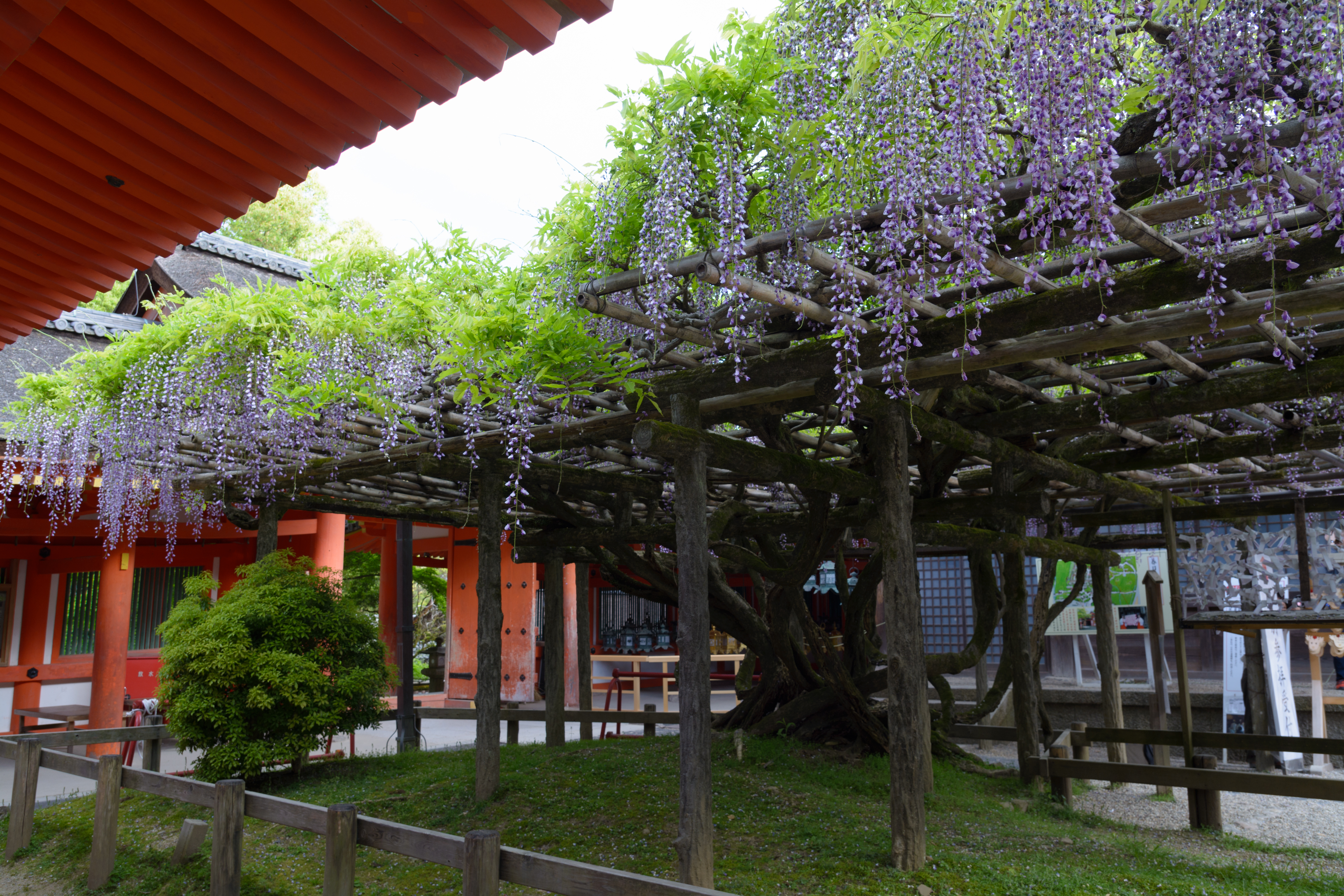
Sunazuri-no-Fuji (wisteria flower) in Kasuga-taisha

- Former Daijō-in Gardens (旧大乗院庭園)
- Isuien Garden
- Kyūseki Teien
- Manyo Botanical Garden, Nara
- Yagyū Iris Garden, Nara (柳生花しょうぶ園)
- Yoshiki-en

=== Other ===
- Nara Hotel
- Nara National Research Institute for Cultural Properties
- Nara Park
- Yagyū
- Zutō (頭塔)

=== Music ===
- Tipsy night, a rock band from Nara, contributed the theme song for the Naruto: Gekitō Ninja Taisen! 4 (僕の愛してるだれもいない) games

=== Events ===
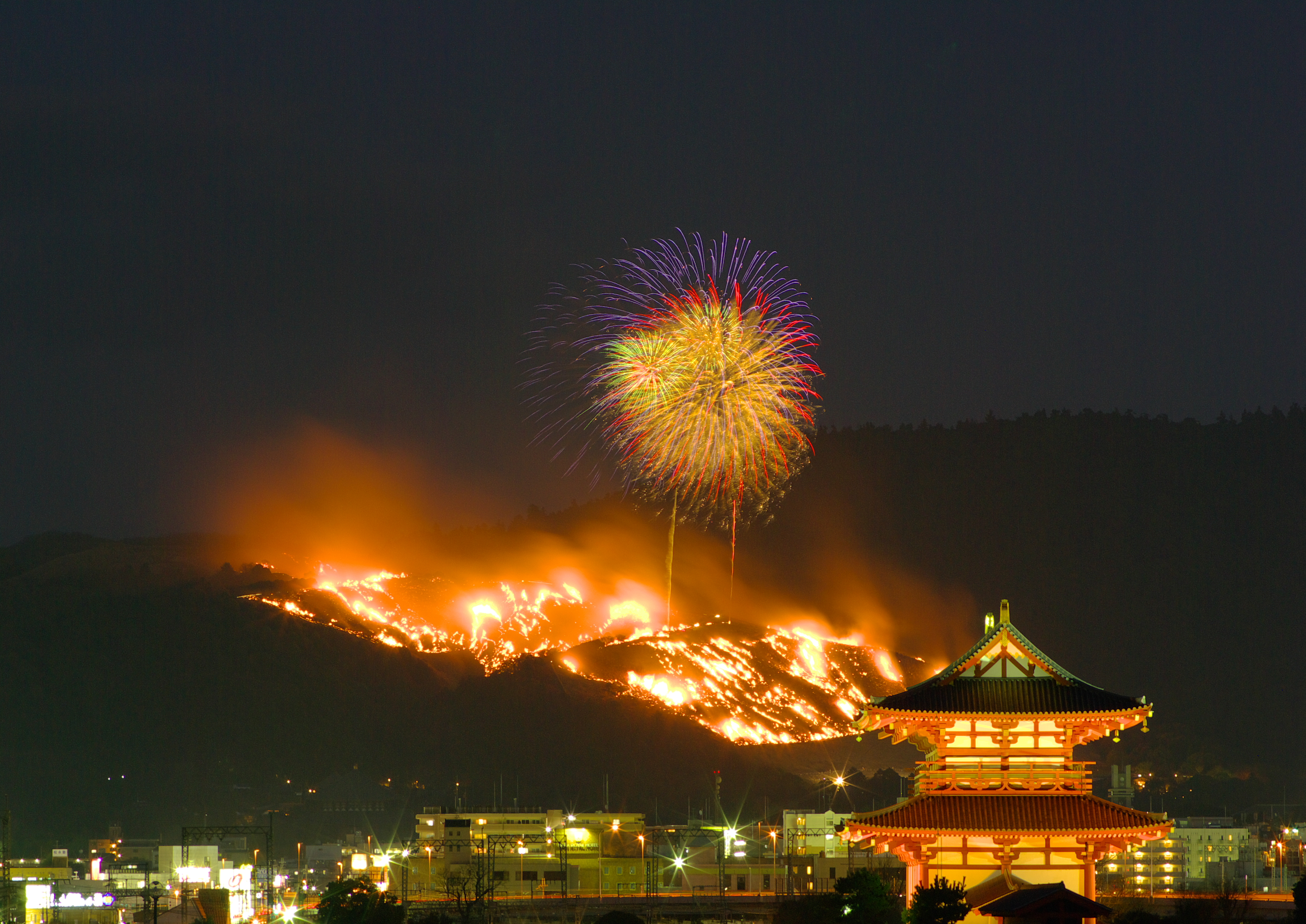
Burning the dead grass of Mount Wakakusa and Suzakumon of Heijō Palace

- Nara Centennial Hall
- Nara Kasugano International Forum Iraka
- Nara Marathon
- Shuni-e
Gallery

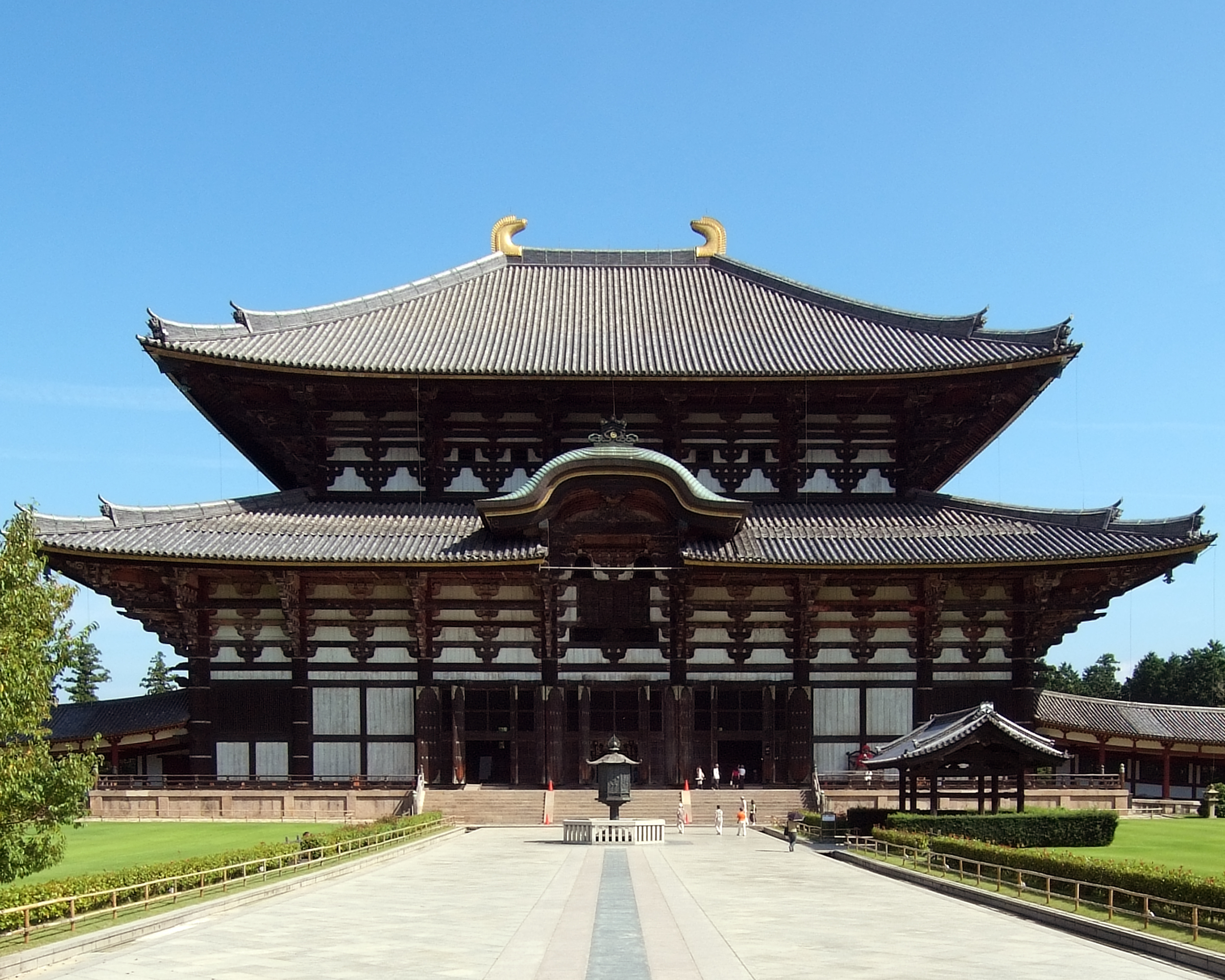
Tōdai-ji Temple Daibutsuden Hall, the world's largest wooden building

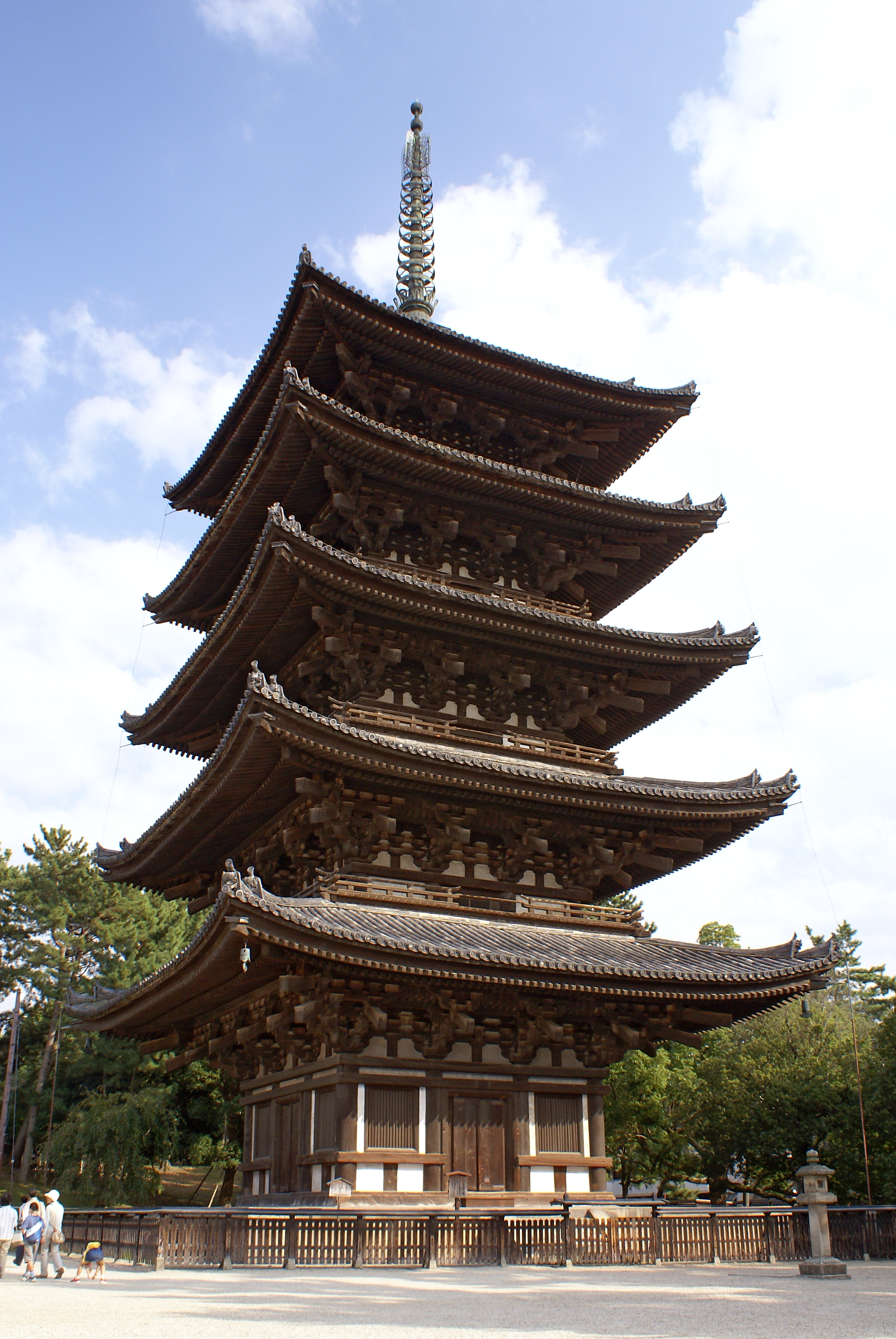
Kōfuku-ji in the center of Nara

== Deer in Nara ==
According to the legendary history of Kasuga Shrine, the god Takemikazuchi arrived in Nara on a white deer to guard the newly built capital of Heijō-kyō. Since then, the deer have been regarded as heavenly animals, protecting the city and the country.

Tame sika deer (also known as spotted deer or Japanese deer) roam through the town, especially in Nara Park. In 2015, there were more than 1,200 sika deer in Nara. Snack vendors sell sika senbei (deer crackers) to visitors so they can feed the deer. Some deer have learned to bow in order to receive senbei from people.

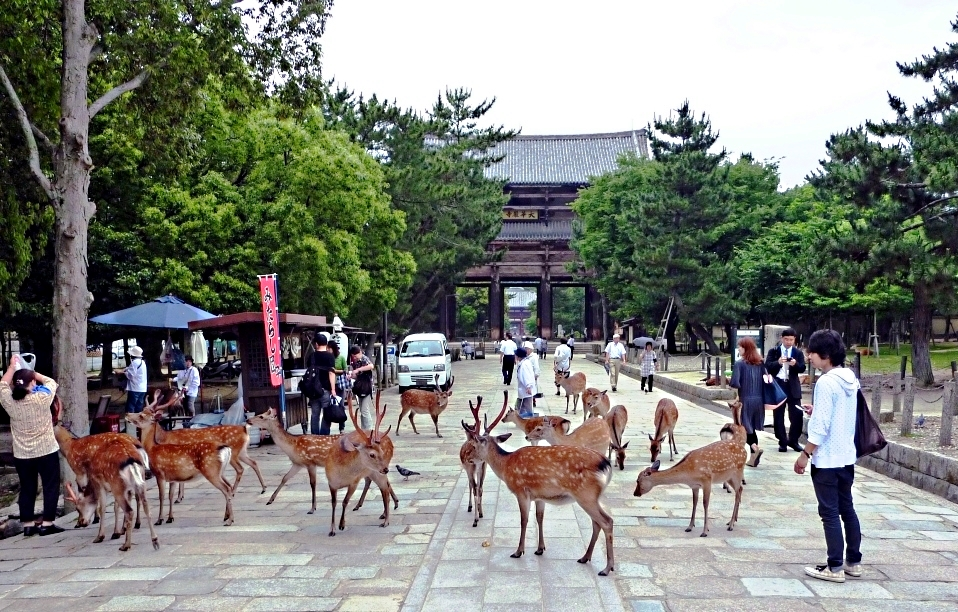
Deer roaming in Nara city (2010)

=== Issues ===
A 2009 study by Harumi Torii, assistant professor of wildlife management at Nara University of Education, in which necropsies of deceased sika deer in Nara park were conducted, found that the deer in Nara park were malnourished from not having enough grass to eat, and eating too many rice crackers and other human food. The rice crackers commonly fed to the deer lack fiber and other nutrients deer require, so when the deer eat too many rice crackers it causes the gut microbiome in the deer to become unbalanced, among other problems. Seven out of eight deer dissected had a "kidney fat index" (which measures how much fat has attached to the kidneys) below 40%, which indicates malnutrition. And of those seven, some had kidney fat below 10%, which indicates starvation. Compared to male shika deer outside Nara park, which weigh about 50 kilograms on average, the male sika deer in Nara park only weigh 30 kilograms on average. The color of the femoral marrow in Nara park’s deer was also abnormal, indicating malnourishment. When living deer in Nara park were observed during the study, it was discovered that rice crackers made up about one third of the average deer’s diet in Nara park, with grass making up about two thirds. The deer have become so excessively numerous in Nara park, that there isn’t enough grass in the park for all of them to live entirely on grass, creating a dependency on humans for rice crackers. This lack of grass also causes the deer to resort to eating garbage and plants that they would not normally eat. The deer in Nara park have become overpopulated due to being fed by people frequently, and having few predators and the deer have caused extensive damage to trees (by feeding on bark), bamboo (by eating their shoots), and other plants in the park. Additionally, the deer have become aggressive towards humans in their solicitation of food (which leads to people getting injured by deer), aggressive towards each other in competition for rice crackers, and have lost their fear of predators in general. For these reasons, tourists may want to consider not feeding the deer in Nara park, and simply observe them instead.

Gallery

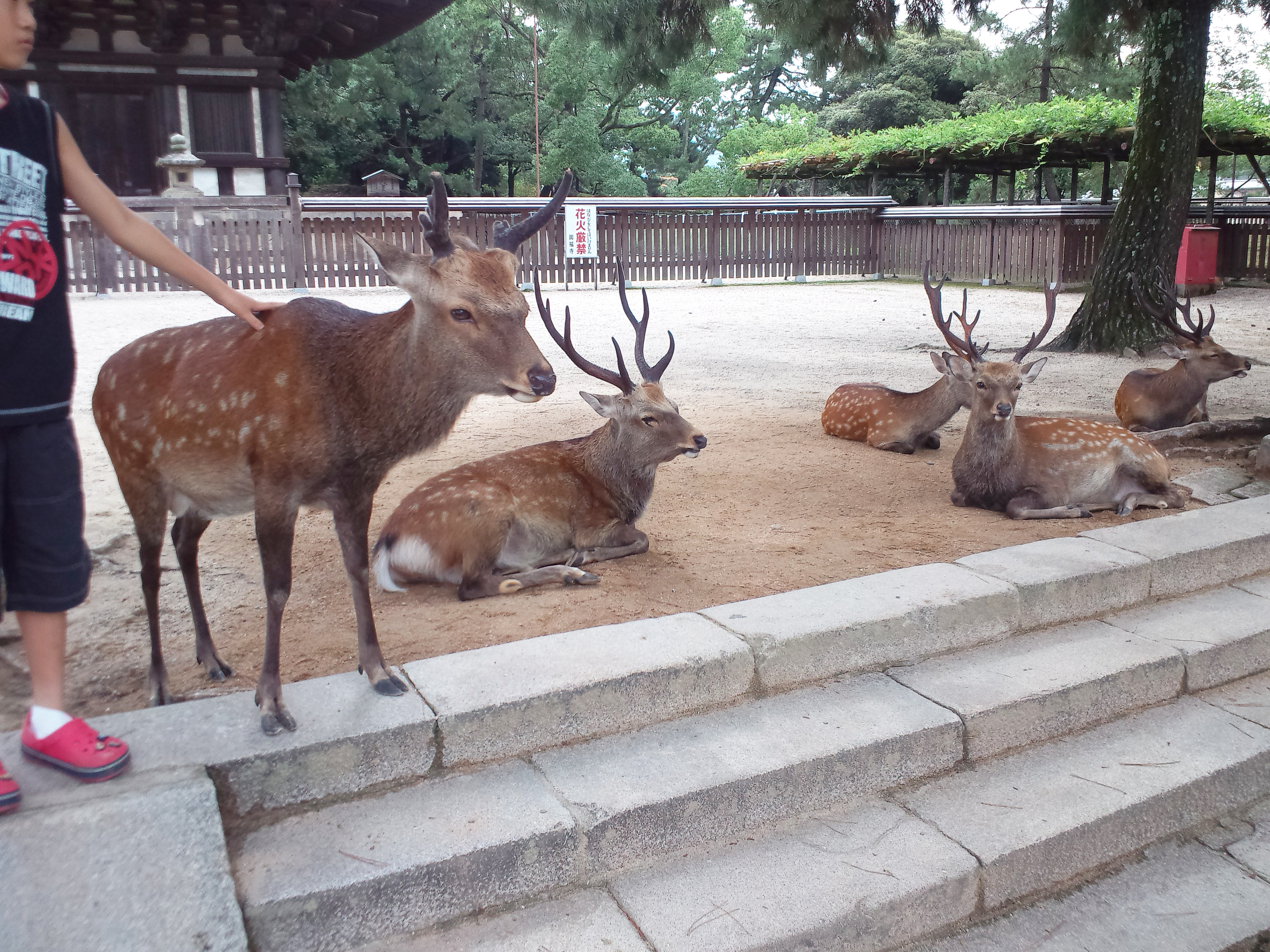
Deer in Nara Park (2012)

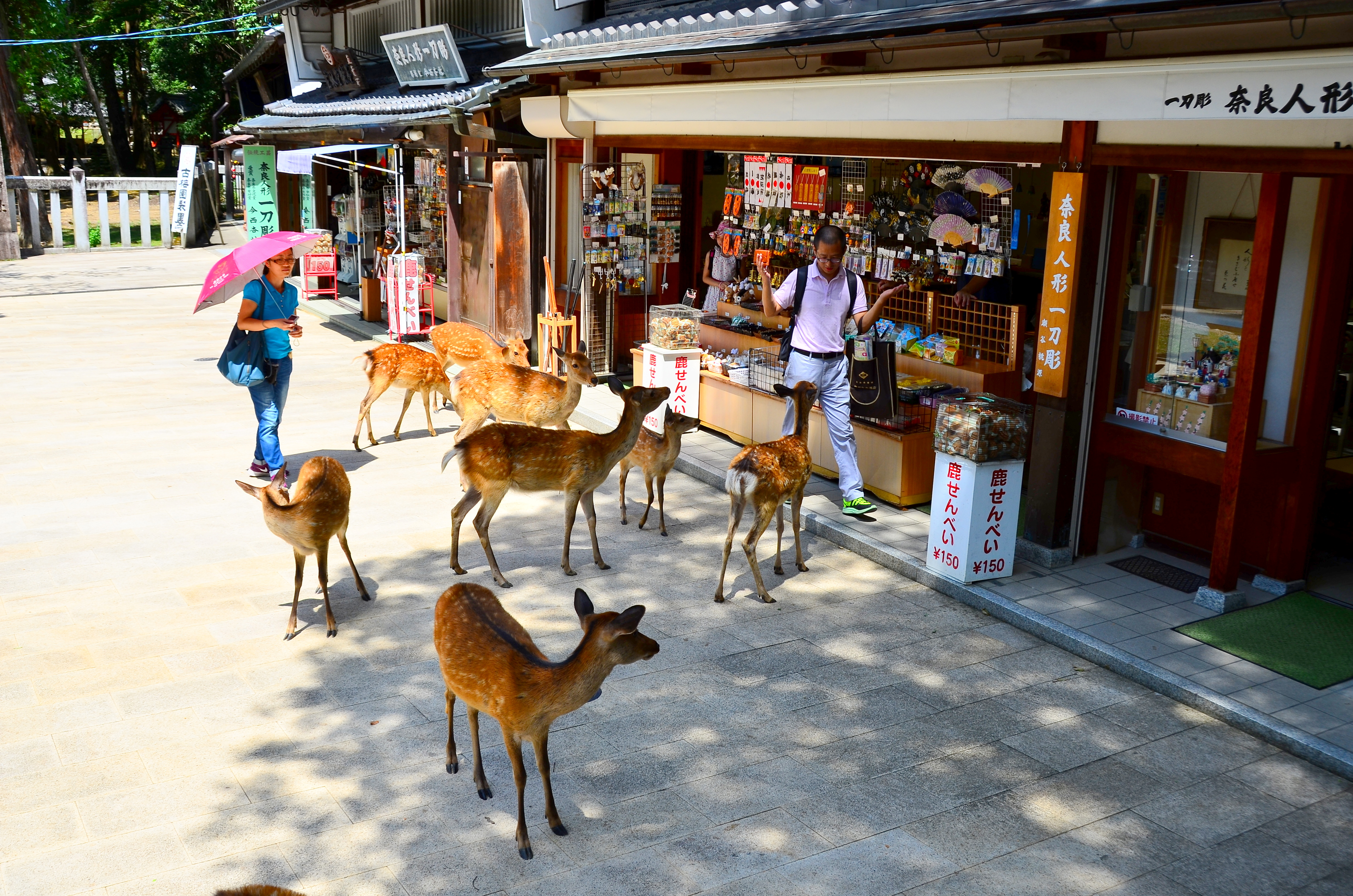
Deer approaching tourists in Nara Park in summer

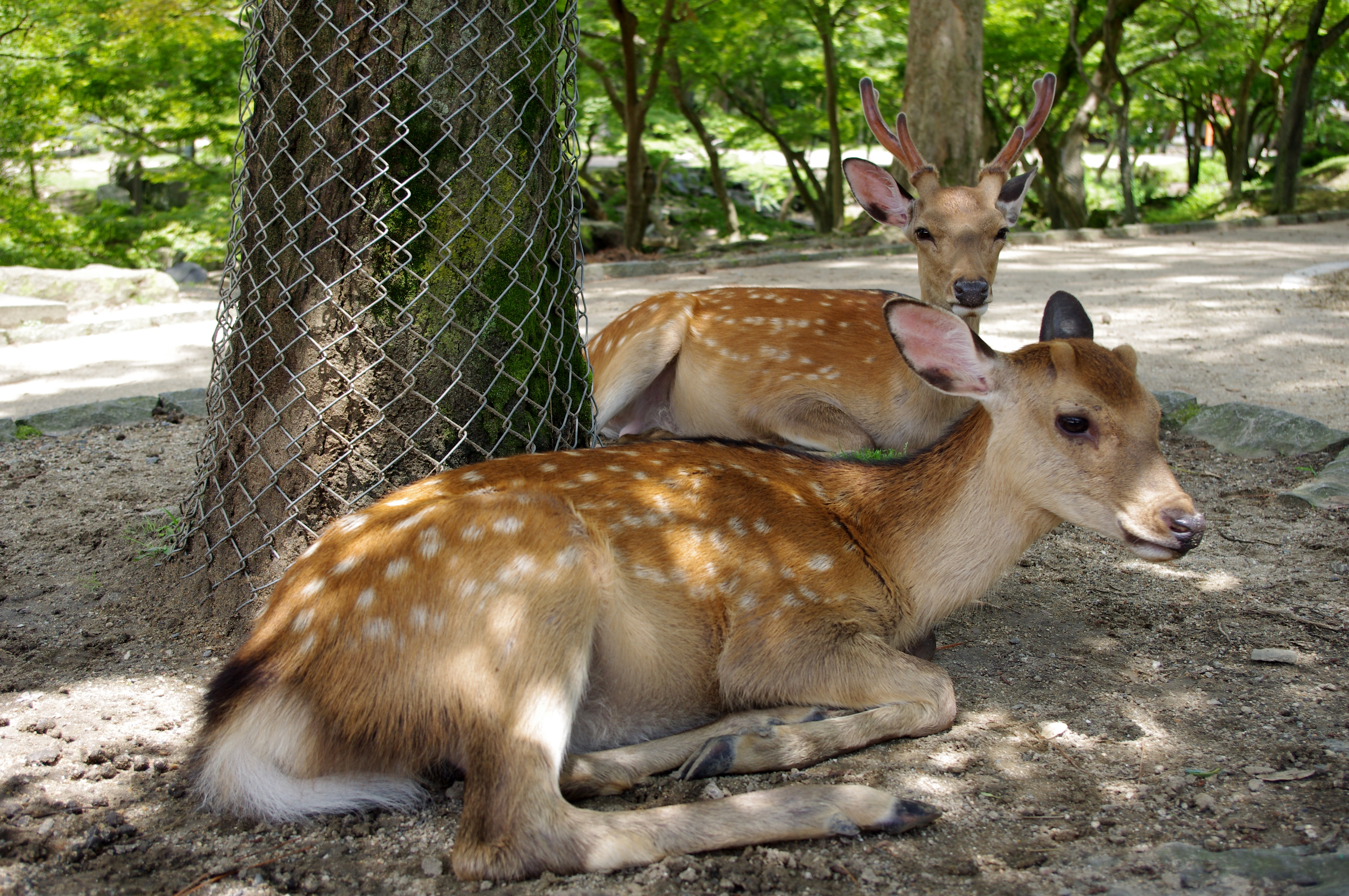
Deer in Nara Park

== Education ==
As of 2005, there are 16 high schools and 6 universities located in the city of Nara.

=== Universities ===
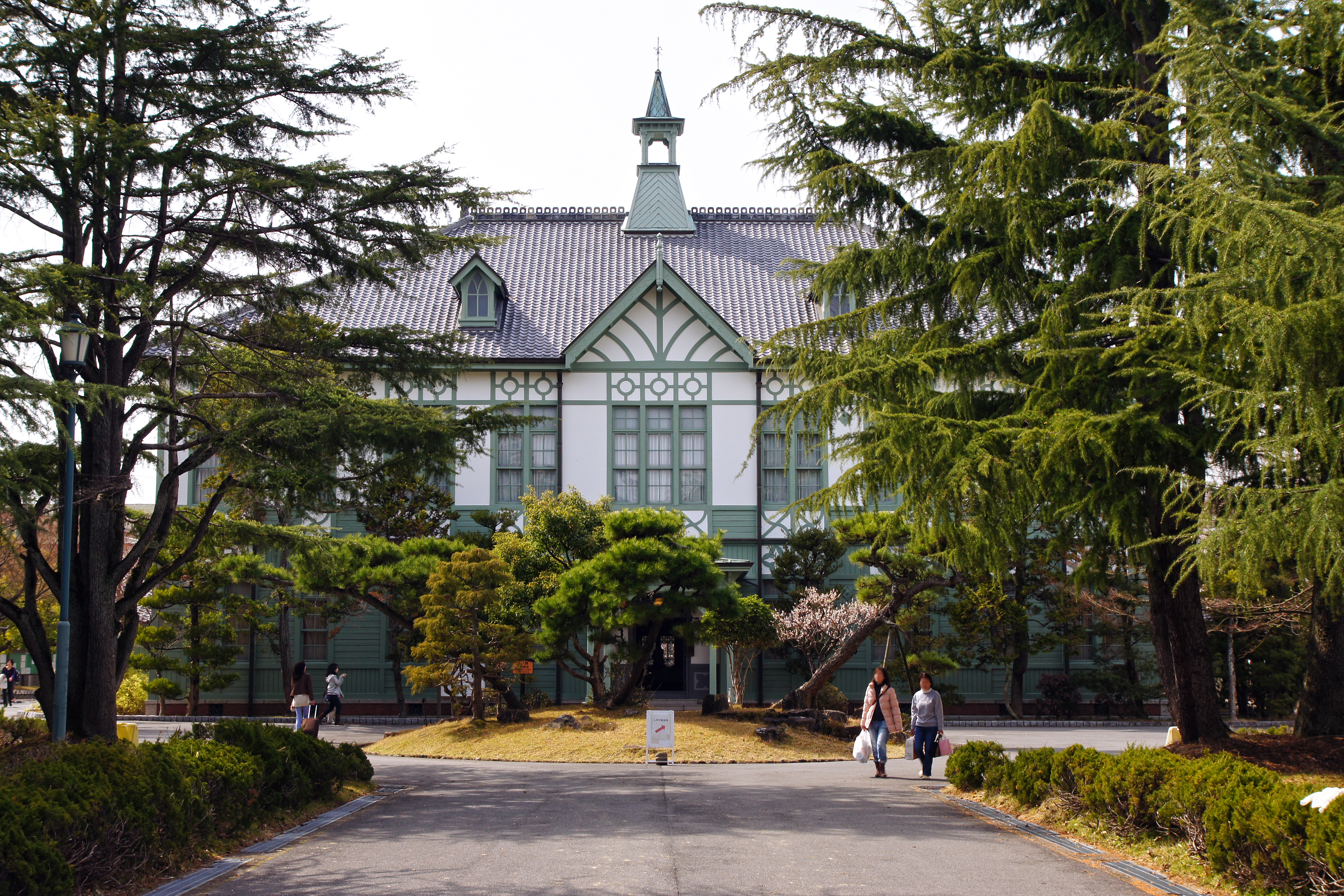
Nara Women's University former main building

Nara Women's University is one of only two national women's universities in Japan. Nara Institute of Science and Technology is a graduate research university specializing in biological, information, and materials sciences.

=== Primary and secondary education ===
==== Public schools ====
Public elementary and junior high schools are operated by the city of Nara.

Public high schools are operated by the Nara Prefecture.

==== Private schools ====
Private high schools in Nara include the Tōdaiji Gakuen, a private school founded by the temple in 1926.

== Transportation ==
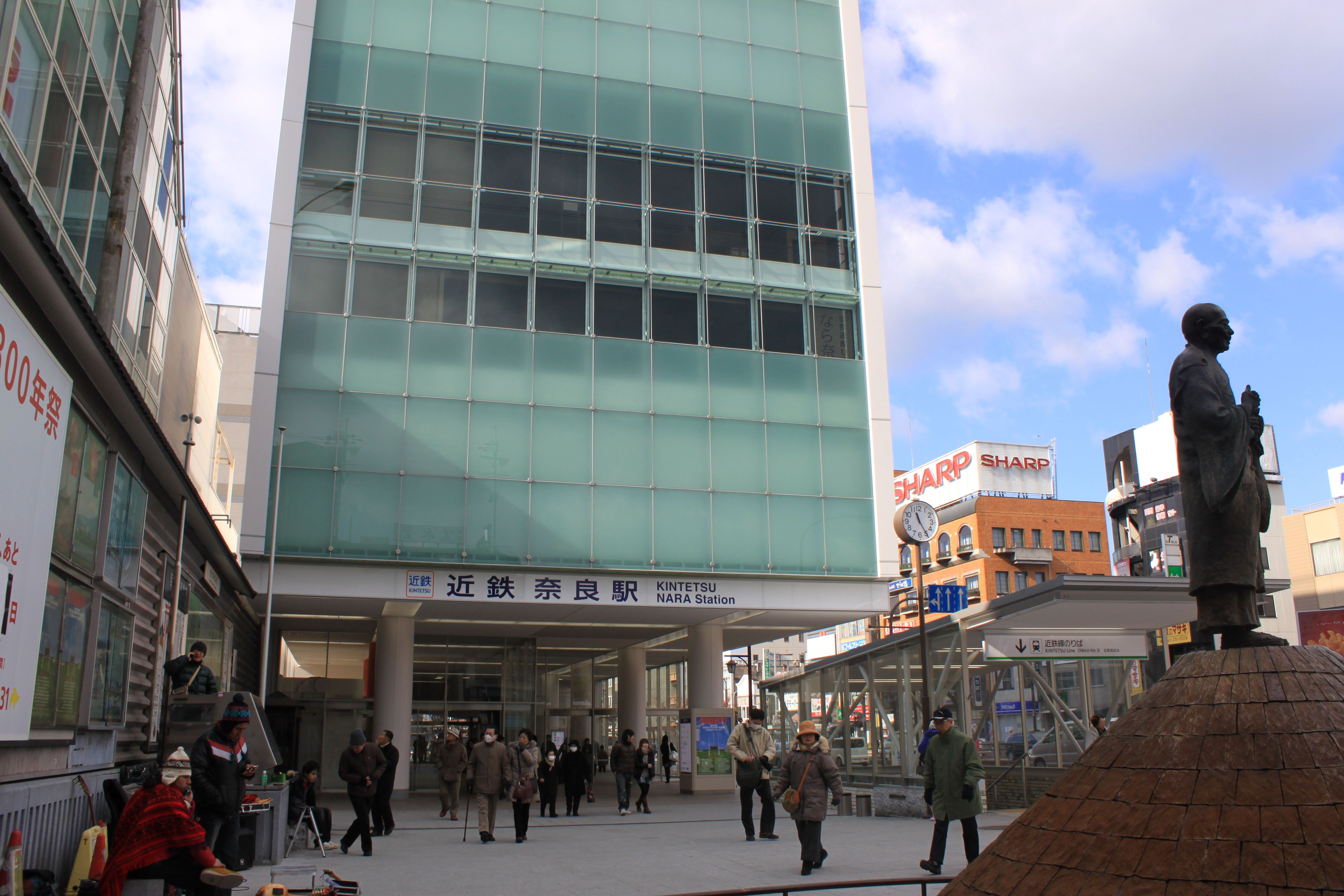
Kintetsu Nara Station

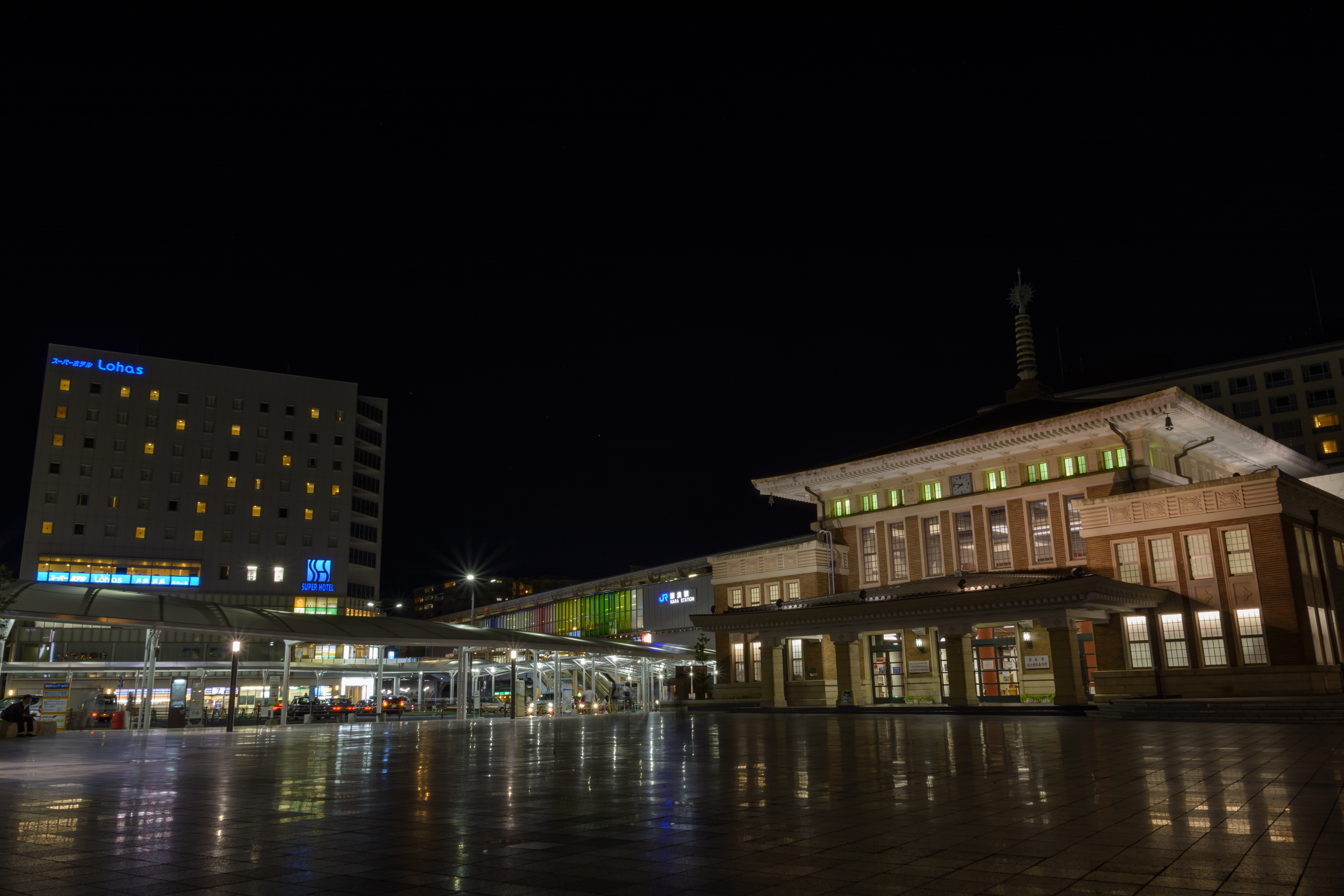
JR Nara Station

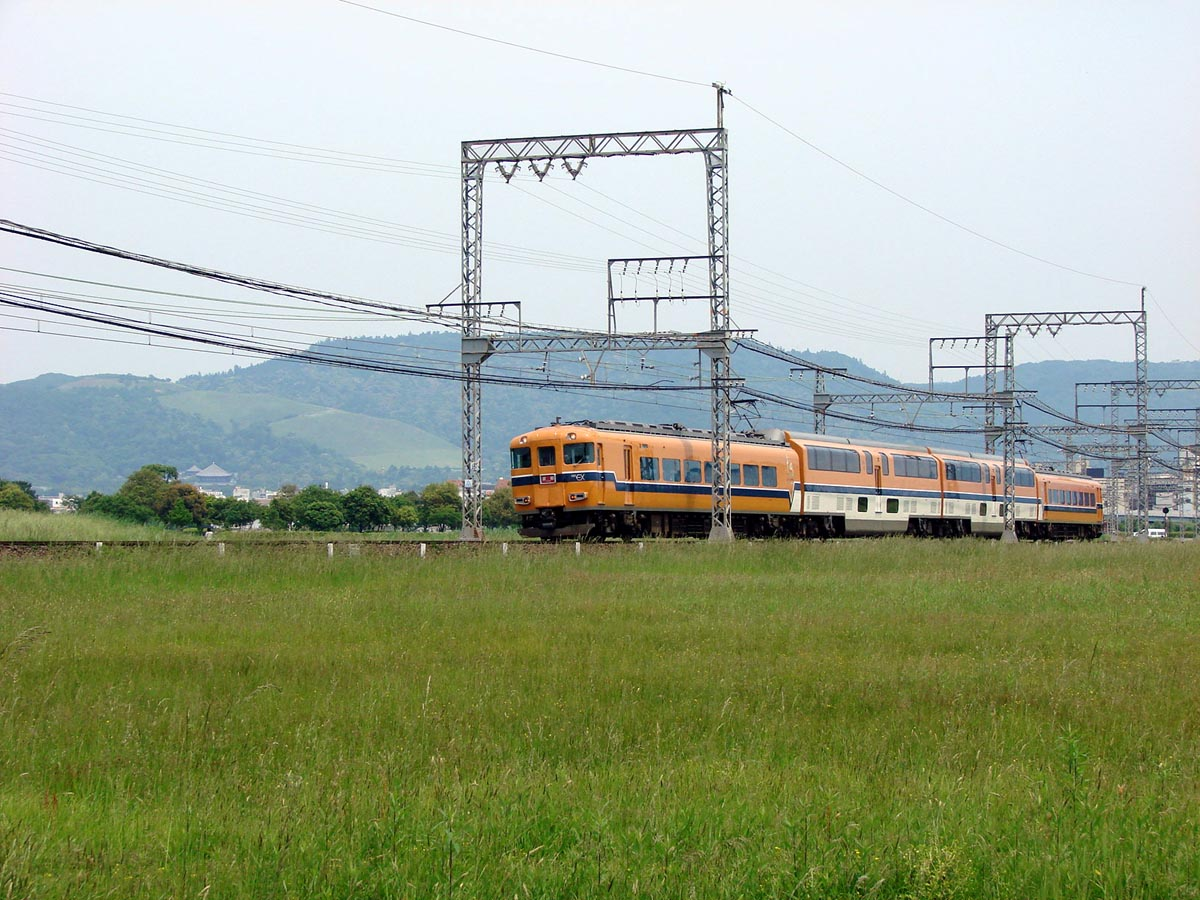
Kintetsu Limited Express passing through the Heijo Palace ruins. Mt. Wakakusa and Todaiji Temple are in the background.

The main central station of Nara is Kintetsu Nara Station with JR Nara station some 500m west and much closer to Shin-Omiya station.

=== Rail ===
- Kintetsu Railway
  - Nara Line: Tomio Station – Gakuen-mae Station – Ayameike Station – Yamato-Saidaiji Station – Shin-Ōmiya Station – Kintetsu Nara Station
  - Kyoto Line: Takanohara Station – Heijō Station – Yamato-Saidaiji Station
  - Kashihara Line: Yamato-Saidaiji Station – Amagatsuji Station – Nishinokyō Station
  - Keihanna Line: Gakken Nara-Tomigaoka Station
- West Japan Railway Company
  - Kansai Main Line (Yamatoji Line): Narayama Station – Nara Station
  - Sakurai Line (Manyō-Mahoroba Line): Nara Station – Kyōbate Station – Obitoke Station

=== Roads ===
- Expressways
  - Keinawa Expressway (Under construction)
  - Hanshin Expressway Dainihanna Route
- Japan National Route 24
- Japan National Route 25
- Japan National Route 169
- Japan National Route 308
- Japan National Route 369
- Japan National Route 370

=== Air ===
Nara does not have an airport. The nearest airports are:

- Kansai International Airport
- Itami Airport

== Sister cities ==
=== International ===
Nara's sister cities are:

- Canberra, Australia (1993)
- Gyeongju, Gyeongsangbuk-do, South Korea (1970)
- Huế, Vietnam (2011)
- Toledo, Province of Toledo, Spain (1972)
- Versailles, Yvelines, France (1986)
- Samarkand, Samarqand Region, Uzbekistan (2022)
- Xi'an, Shaanxi, China (1974, friendly city)
- Yangzhou, Jiangsu, China (2010, friendly city)

=== Domestic ===
- Dazaifu, Fukuoka Prefecture, Japan
- Kōriyama, Fukushima Prefecture, Japan
- Obama, Fukui Prefecture, Japan
- Tagajō, Miyagi Prefecture, Japan
- Usa, Ōita Prefecture, Japan

== In popular culture ==
Nara is featured in the anime and manga, Tonikawa: Fly Me to the Moon. The city is also the inspiring location for the 2014 album This Is All Yours by English indie rock band Alt-J.
