= Nara Marathon =

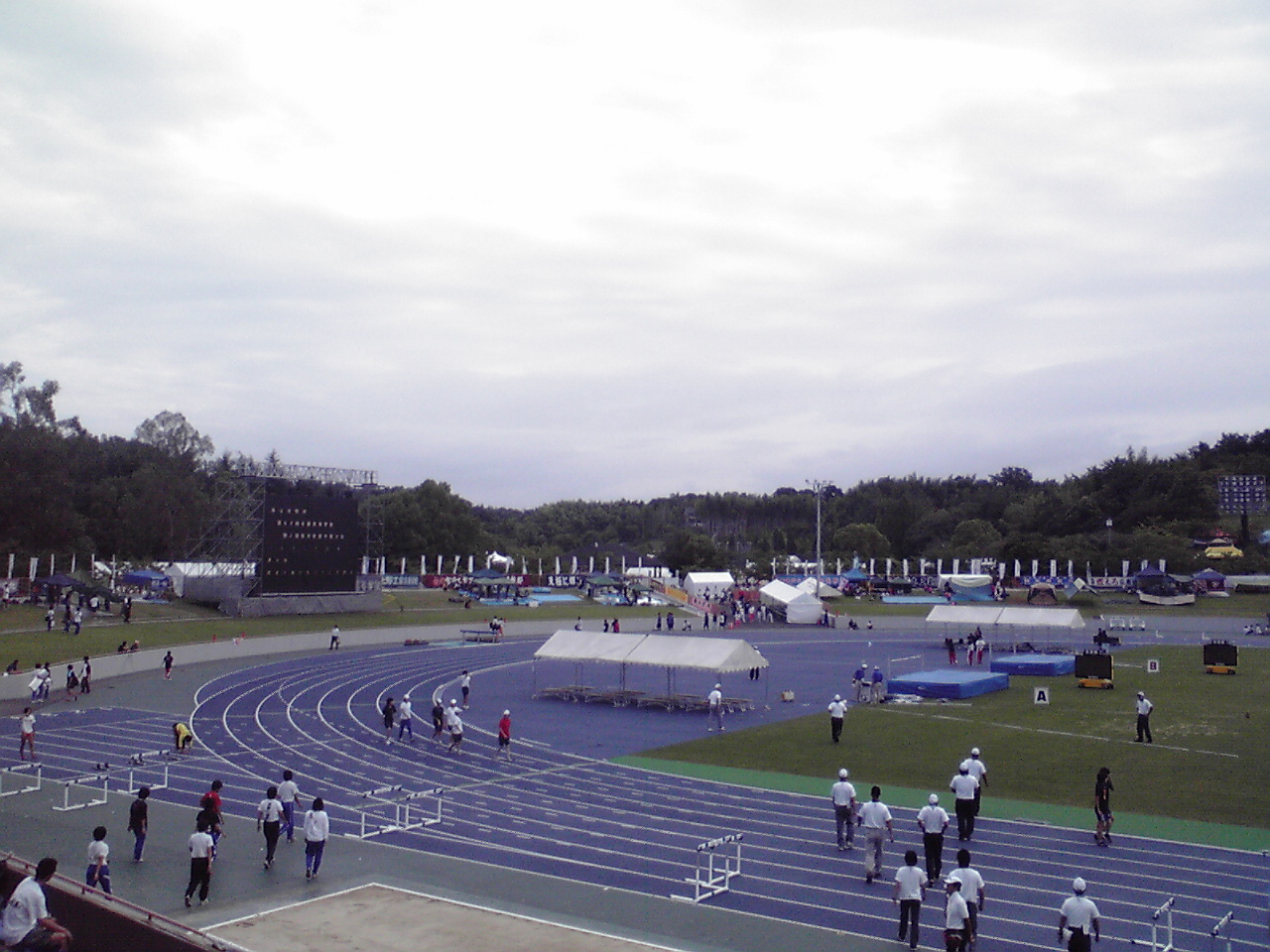
- Start and finish stadium
- Date: December
- Location: Nara, Japan
- Event type: road
- Distance: Marathon
- Established: 2010
- Course records: Men: 2:18:56 (2018) (Japan) Yūya Tsukamoto; Women: 2:33:22 (2019) (Japan) Haruka Yamaguchi
- Website: Nara Marathon
- Participants: 6,789 finishers (2021); 11,137 (2019)

The Nara Marathon (奈良マラソン, Nara Marason) is an annual marathon sporting event for men and women over the classic distance of 42.195 kilometres which is held on the 2nd sunday of December in Nara, Nara Prefecture, Japan.

The race starts at Konoike Athletic Stadium, and after the course passes through Nara and Tenri cities, came back and finishes at Konoike Athletic Stadium.

== Results ==
Key: Course record

Edition	Year	Men's winner	Time (h:m:s)	Women's winner	Time (h:m:s)
1st	2010	Nobuyuki Matsumoto (JPN)	2:23:16	Kaoru Tabata (JPN)	2:49:52
2nd	2011	Osamu Hirata (JPN)	2:20:23	Yoshimi Hoshino (JPN)	2:47:50
3rd	2012	Tomoya Nagasawa (JPN)	2:28:58	Ikue Tabata (JPN)	2:43:16
4th	2013	Osamu Hirata (JPN)	2:23:46	Yuri Yoshizumi (JPN)	2:46:21
5th	2014	Yoshinori Sugimoto (JPN)	2:24:14	Haruka Yamaguchi (JPN)	2:45:55
6th	2015	Osamu Hirata (JPN)	2:24:41	Ikue Tabata (JPN)	2:53:57
7th	2016	Osamu Hirata (JPN)	2:27:50	Saki Tokoro (JPN)	2:44:05
8th	2017	Yoshiyuki Hara (JPN)	2:23:53	Sanae Taketsu (JPN)	2:46:59
9th	2018	Yūya Tsukamoto (JPN)	2:18:56	Haruka Yamaguchi (JPN)	2:40:50
10th	2019	Yoshihiro Yamamoto (JPN)	2:21:22	Haruka Yamaguchi (JPN)	2:33:22
—	2020	Did not held			
11th	2021	Yoshihiro Yamamoto (JPN)	2:21:55	Haruka Yamaguchi (JPN)	2:34:36
