= Heijō Station =

Railway station in Nara, Nara Prefecture, Japan

Heijō Station 平城駅
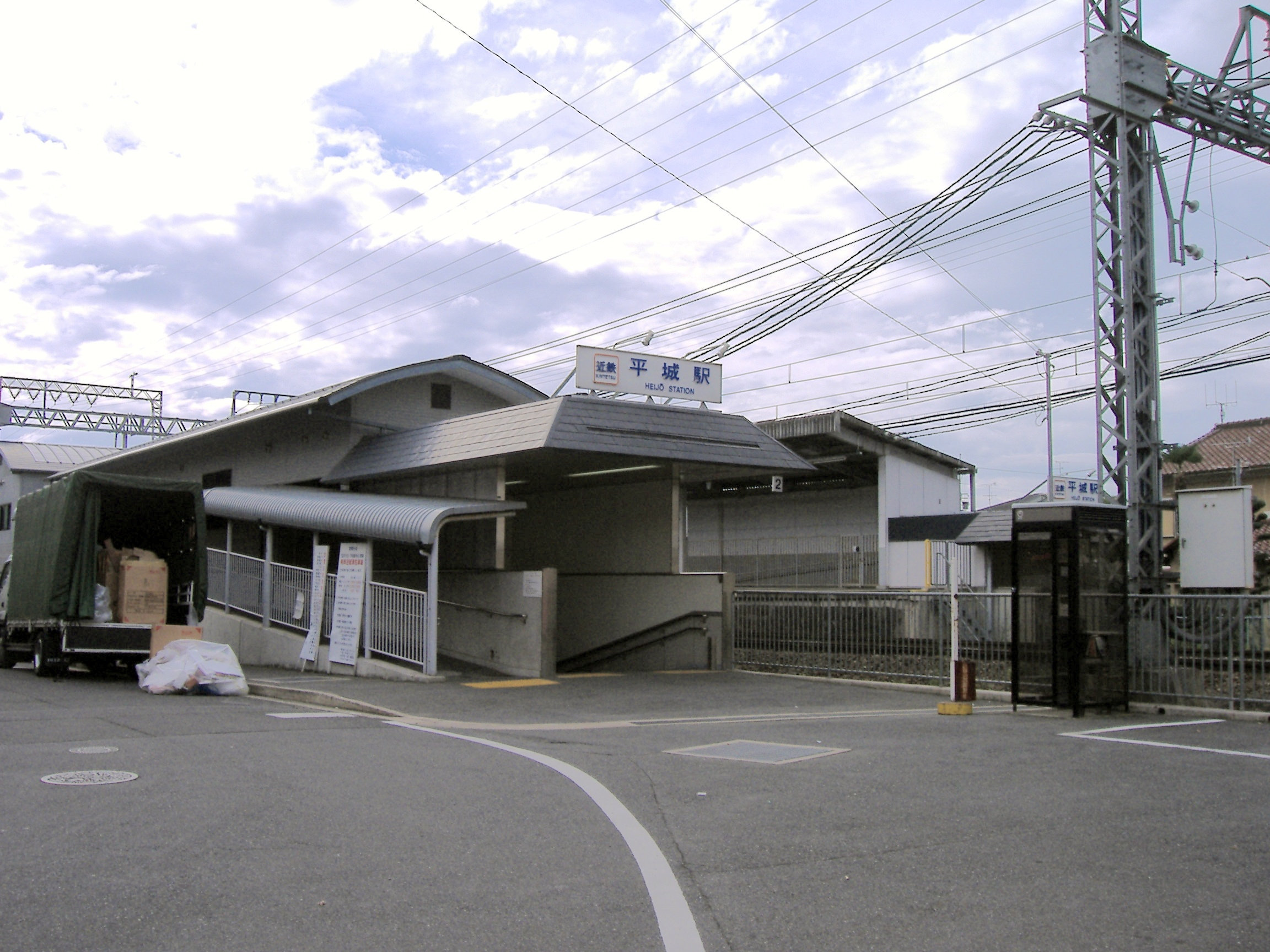
- Heijō Station in September 2006.

General information
- Location: Miyanomae, Misasagi, Nara-shi, Nara-ken 631-0803; Japan
- Coordinates: 34°42′5.7″N 135°47′6.14″E
- System: Kintetsu Railway commuter rail station
- Owner: Kintetsu Railway
- Operator: Kintetsu Railway
- Line: Kyoto/Kashihara Line
- Distance: 33.5 km (20.8 miles) from Kyoto
- Platforms: 2 side platforms
- Tracks: 2
- Train operators: Kintetsu Railway
- Connections: Bus terminal

Construction
- Cycle facilities: Available
- Accessible: Yes

Other information
- Station code: B25
- Website: www.kintetsu.co.jp/station/station_info/station05029.html

History
- Opened: 3 November 1928

Passengers
- FY2022: 2,735 daily

Services
Preceding station	Kintetsu Railway	Following station
Takanohara towards Kyōto	Kyoto Line Local	Yamato-Saidaiji Terminus
Location

Heijō Station (平城駅, Heijō-eki) is a passenger railway station located in the city of Nara, Nara Prefecture, Japan. It is operated by the private transportation company, Kintetsu Railway.

== Line ==
Heijō Station is served by the Kyoto Line and is 33.5 kilometers from the starting point of the line at Kyoto.

== Layout ==
The station consists two opposing side platforms and two tracks. The effective length of the platform is six cars because express trains make special stops during the Nara Velodrome race. The ticket gates and concourse are underground, while the platform is above ground. There is only one ticket gate. There is one entrance on the platform 1 side and two entrances on the platform 2 side. Before the station was made underground, there was a small station building on the Kyoto side of platform 1, which was connected to platform 2 by a level crossing within the premises. When Velodrome races were held, a special ticket gate was set up in the middle of platform 2, close to the velodrome. The station is staffed.

== Platforms ==
1	■ B Kyoto Line	for Yamato-Saidaiji, Nara, Tenri, and Kashiharajingu-mae
2	■ B Kyoto Line	for Shin-Tanabe, Tambabashi, Kyoto, and Kokusaikaikan

== History ==
Heijō Station was opened 3 November 1928 on the Nara Electric Railroad. Due to a company merger, line became the Kintetsu Railway Kyoto Line in 1963.

== Passenger statistics ==
In fiscal 2022, the station was used by an average of 2,735 passengers daily (boarding passengers only).

== Surrounding area ==
- Nara Velodrome

== See also ==
- List of railway stations in Japan
