= List of gardens =

The following gardens are parks or gardens open to the public, anywhere in the world.

Other lists include List of botanical gardens and List of English landscape gardens.

== Argentina ==
- Buenos Aires Botanical Garden

== Australia ==
Australian Capital Territory

- Australian National Botanic Gardens

New South Wales

- Auburn Botanical Gardens
- Royal Botanic Gardens
- Wollongong Botanic Garden

Queensland

- Anderson Park, Townsville
- Brisbane Botanic Gardens, Mount Coot-tha
- City Botanic Gardens
- The Palmetum, Townsville
- Queens Gardens, Townsville
- Roma Street Parkland

Victoria

- Melbourne parks and gardens
- Geelong Botanic Gardens

== Austria ==
- Schönbrunn Palace Gardens
- Belvedere Gardens

== Brazil ==
- Flamengo Park
- Rio de Janeiro Botanical Garden
- Inhotim
- Botanical Garden of São Paulo
- Sítio Roberto Burle Marx
- Botanical Garden of Curitiba
- Porto Alegre Botanical Garden
- Jardim Botânico de Belo Horizonte
- Jardim Botânico de Brasília

== Canada ==
- Butchart Gardens, Greater Victoria, British Columbia
- Royal Botanical Gardens, Hamilton, Ontario
- Stanley Park, Vancouver, British Columbia

== Colombia ==
- Bogotá Botanical Garden, Bogotá
- Botanical Garden of Medellín, Medellín
- Nutibara sculpture park

== Czech Republic ==
- Mulberry Garden
- Vrtba Garden

== Denmark ==
- Kongens Have (King's Garden), Copenhagen

== Egypt ==
- Montaza Palace Gardens

== France ==
- Gardens of Versailles
  - Potager du roi, Versailles
- Roseraie du Val-de-Marne
- Parc de la Tête d'or

== Germany ==
- Dessau-Wörlitz Garden Realm
- Englischer Garten

== Greece ==
- National Garden, Athens

== Iceland ==
- Akureyri Botanical Garden, Akureyri

== Indonesia ==
- Bogor Botanical Gardens
- Bali Botanic Garden
- Cibodas Botanical Garden
- Purwodadi Botanical Garden

== Iran ==
- Afif-Abad Garden, Shiraz
- Akbarieh Garden, Birjand
- Chehel Sotun Garden, Behshahr, Iran
- Chehel Sotoun Garden, Isfahan
- Cheshme Belghais Garden, Charam
- Delgosha Garden, Shiraz
- Dowlatabad Garden, Yazd
- Eram Garden, Shiraz
- Farahabad Garden, Mazandaran
- Ferdows Garden, Tehran
- Fin Garden, Kashan
- Ghavam Garden, Shiraz
- Golestan Garden, Tabriz
- Golshan Garden, Tabas
- Hasht Behesht, Isfahan
- Jahan Nama Garden, Shiraz
- Mosalla Garden, Nain, Iran
- Narenjestan Garden, Shiraz
- Nazar Garden, Shiraz
- Qadamgah Garden, Nishapur
- Shah Goli, Tabriz
- Shazdeh Garden, Mahan

== Italy ==
- Biennale Gardens, Venice
- Bioparco, Rome
- Boboli Gardens, Florence
- Bomarzo Garden (Park of the Monsters), Bomarzo
- Caserta Palace Garden, Caserta
- Castello Sforzesco Garden (Parco Sempione), Milan
- Domus Aurea, Rome
- Ducal Palace of Colorno, Colorno
- Ducal Palace of Sassuolo, Sassuolo
- La Foce, Montepulciano
- Fonte di Fata Morgana, Grassina
- The garden of the Rotonda Padua, Padua
- Gardens of Sallust, Rome
- Gardens of Trauttmansdorff Castle, Meran
- Giardini di Giusti, Verona
- Isola Madre, Alpine Lake Maggiore
- Palatine Hill, Rome
- Palazzo Malipiero Garden, Venice
- Palazzo Pfanner Garden, Lucca
- Palazzo Piccolomini Garden, Pienza
- Parco Virgiliano, Naples
- Villa Ada, Rome
- Villa Adriana, Tivoli
- Villa Aldobrandini, Frascati
- Villa Barbarigo a Valsanzibio, Padua
- Villa Borghese gardens, Rome
- Villa Carlotta, Como
- Villa Cetinale, Sovicille
- Villa Comunale (originally Royal Garden), Naples
- Villa del Balbianello, Como
- Villa d'Este, Tivoli
- Villa Doria Pamphili, Rome
- Villa Durazzo-Pallavicini, Genoa
- Villa La Petraia, Florence
- Villa La Pietra, Florence
- Villa Lante, Viterbo
- Villa Marlia Garden, Lucca
- Villa Medici, Rome
- Villa Medici at Cafaggiolo, Barberino di Mugello
- Villa Palmieri, Fiesole, Fiesole
- Villa San Michele, Naples
- Vittoriale degli Italiani, Brescia

== Japan ==
- Banshu Yamasaki Iris Garden
- Isui-en
- Kairaku-en
- Kanehiranari-en
- Koko-en
- Kōraku-en
- Kōsetsu-en
- Oyaku-en
- Rakusui-en
- Ran no Yakata
- Ritsurin Garden
- Saitō Garden
- Sankei-en
- Seibi-en
- Seito shoin teien
- Sengan-en
- Shikina-en
- Shinjuku Gyo-en
- Shofu-en
- Shōyō-en
- Shukkei-en
- Shūraku-en
- Suizen-ji Jōju-en
- Three Great Gardens of Japan
- Tokugawa Garden
- Yoshiki-en
- Zuiraku-en

== Latvia ==
- Vērmane Garden

== Malaysia ==
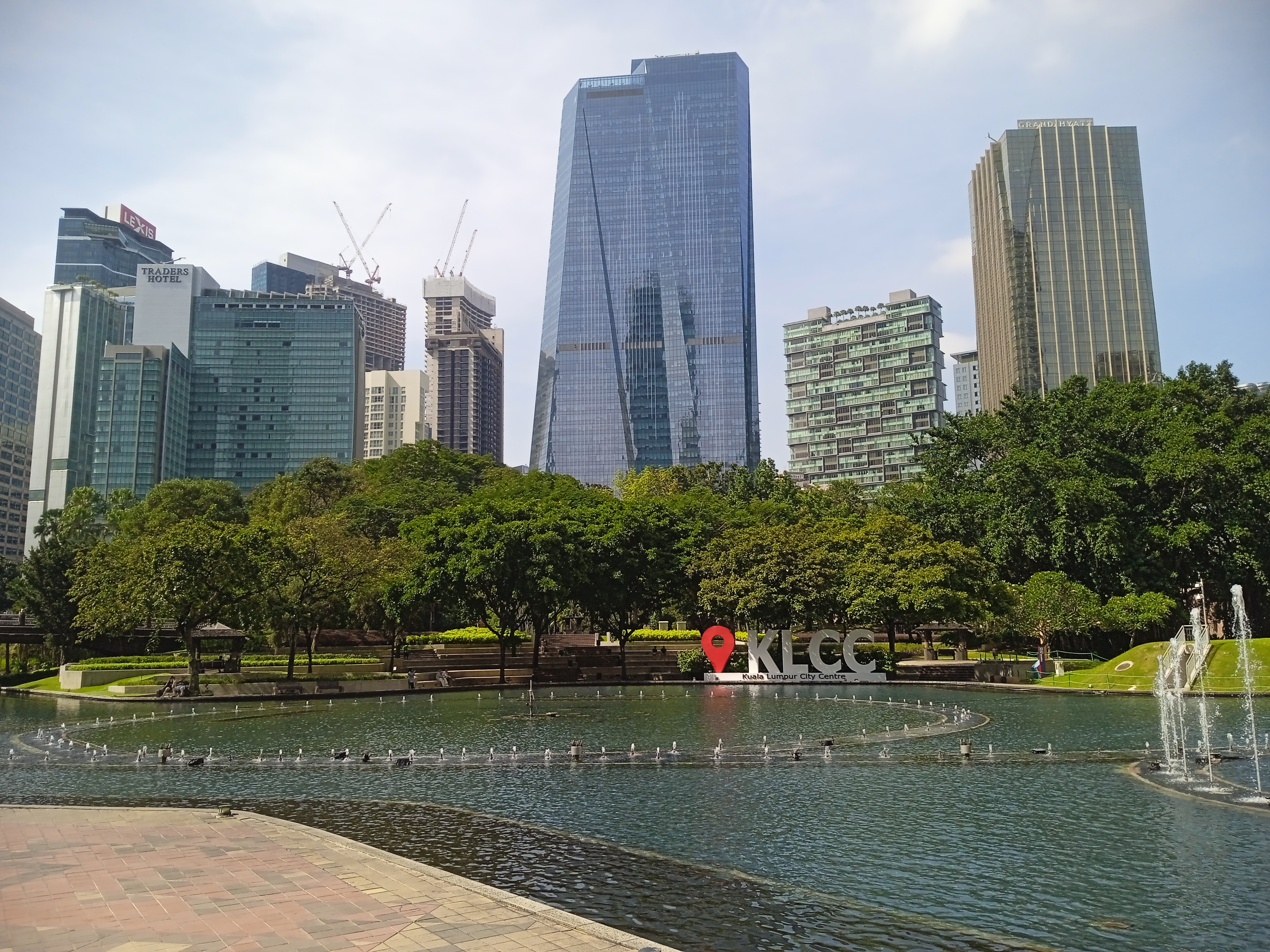
KLCC Park

- Bukit Nanas
- Kuala Lumpur Butterfly Park
- KLCC Park
- National Botanical Garden Shah Alam
- Penang Botanic Gardens
- Perdana Botanical Gardens
- Perdana Park
- Taiping Lake Gardens
- Titiwangsa Lake Gardens

== Mexico ==
- Alameda Central
- Garden of the Triple Alliance
- Texcotzingo
- Xochitla

== Monaco ==
- Casino Gardens and Terraces
- Fontvieille Park and Princess Grace Rose Garden
- Japanese Garden, Monaco
- St Martin Gardens

== Morocco ==
- Agdal Gardens
- Majorelle Garden
- Menara gardens

== Netherlands ==
- Keukenhof
- Prinsentuin
- Thijsse's Hof

== New Zealand ==
- Aston Norwood Gardens
- Ayrlies Garden
- Eden Garden
- Glenfalloch Gardens
- Government Gardens
- Hamilton Gardens
- Longbush Cottage
- Moturau Moana
- Ohinetahi
- Parnell Rose Gardens
- Pukeiti
- Tūpare

== Norway ==
- Flor og Fjære

== Oman ==
- Naseem Garden
- Oman Botanic Garden

== Pakistan ==
- Bagh-e-Jinnah, Lahore
- Hazuri Bagh, Lahore
- Iqbal Park, Lahore (national public park)
- Rani Bagh, Hyderabad
- Shalimar Gardens, Lahore

== Portugal ==
- Estufa Fria
- Garden of Santa Barbara
- Penedo da Saudade

== Russia ==
- Alexander Garden
- Catherine Garden
- Kuskovo Garden
- Monplaisir Garden
- Monrepos Park
- Pavlovsk Park
- Peterhof Garden
- Strelna Garden
- Summer Garden

== South Africa ==
- Jameson Park and Rose Garden

== Spain ==
- Generalife
- Huerta de la Alcurnia
- Jardín histórico
- La Granjilla de La Fresneda de El Escorial
- Sabatini Gardens

== Sweden ==
- Norrviken Gardens
- Oskarshamns Stadspark
- Umedalen skulpturpark
- Vauxhall (Gothenburg)

== Switzerland ==
- Jardin Anglais
- Parc des Eaux Vives
- Parc La Grange
- Rapperswil Rose Gardens

== Turkey ==
- Konya Tropical Butterfly Garden

== Ukraine ==
- Sofiyivka Park

== United Kingdom ==
- Gardens in Northern Ireland
- Gardens in Scotland
- List of gardens in England
- List of gardens in Wales

== United States ==
- Arboretum Villanova, Villanova, Pennsylvania
- Arnold Arboretum, Harvard University, Boston
- Central Park, New York
- Golden Gate Park, San Francisco
- Hakone Gardens, Saratoga, California
- Jacqueline Kennedy Garden, Washington, D.C.
- Kraus Preserve of Ohio Wesleyan University, Delaware, Ohio
- Lincoln Park, Chicago
- National Tropical Botanical Garden, five garden locations
- Sculpture in the Park, Ottawa Hills, Ohio
- White House Rose Garden, Washington, D.C.

== See also ==
- Index of gardening articles
