= Gardens in the Republic of Ireland =

List of gardens in Ireland open to the public:

- Achill Secret Garden,
- Avondale House,
- Altamont Gardens,
- Bay Garden, (Closed indefinitely as of 2022)
- Belvedere House and Gardens,
- Birr Castle,
- Camas Park,
- Coolaught Gardens,
- Coolwater Garden
- Dillon Garden, (Closed indefinitely as of 2022)
- Derreen Garden,
- Emo Court,
- Fernhill House Hotel & Gardens, Clonakilty, Co. Cork
- Fernhill Park and Gardens, Dublin,
- Glenveagh,
- Glebe House and Gallery,
- Huntingbrook Gardens,
- Huntington Castle Gardens,
- Ilnacullin (Garinish or Garnish Island)
- Irish National Botanic Gardens
- Irish National War Memorial Gardens
- Japanese Gardens,
- John F. Kennedy Arboretum,
- Johnstown Castle,
- June Blake's Garden,
- Kells Bay Gardens,
- Kilfane,
- Kilmokea,
- Killruddery,
- Kilmacurragh,
- Knockpatrick Gardens, Foynes, Co. Limerick,
- Larchill,
- Lissadell,
- Lodge Park, Straffan,
- Loftus Hall walled gardens,
- Mount Congreve Garden,
- Mount Usher Gardens,
- Muckross,
- National Garden Exhibition Centre,
- Newtownbarry House Gardens,
- Oakfield Park,
- Powerscourt Estate,
- Ram House Gardens,
- Rathmichael Lodge,
- Talbot Gardens, Malahide,
- Terra Nova Garden,
- Tombrick Garden,

== See also ==
- Conservation in Ireland
- Gardens in Northern Ireland
- Historic Cork Gardens
- List of gardens
- List of botanical gardens
- List of Conservation topics
