= Shankill Castle =

Castle in County Kilkenny, Ireland

Coordinates: 52.6865°N 7.0217°W

Shankill Castle and Gardens is set in parkland near Paulstown on the Carlow/Kilkenny border. Visitors are invited to walk in the grounds and gardens, and there are guided tours of the house.

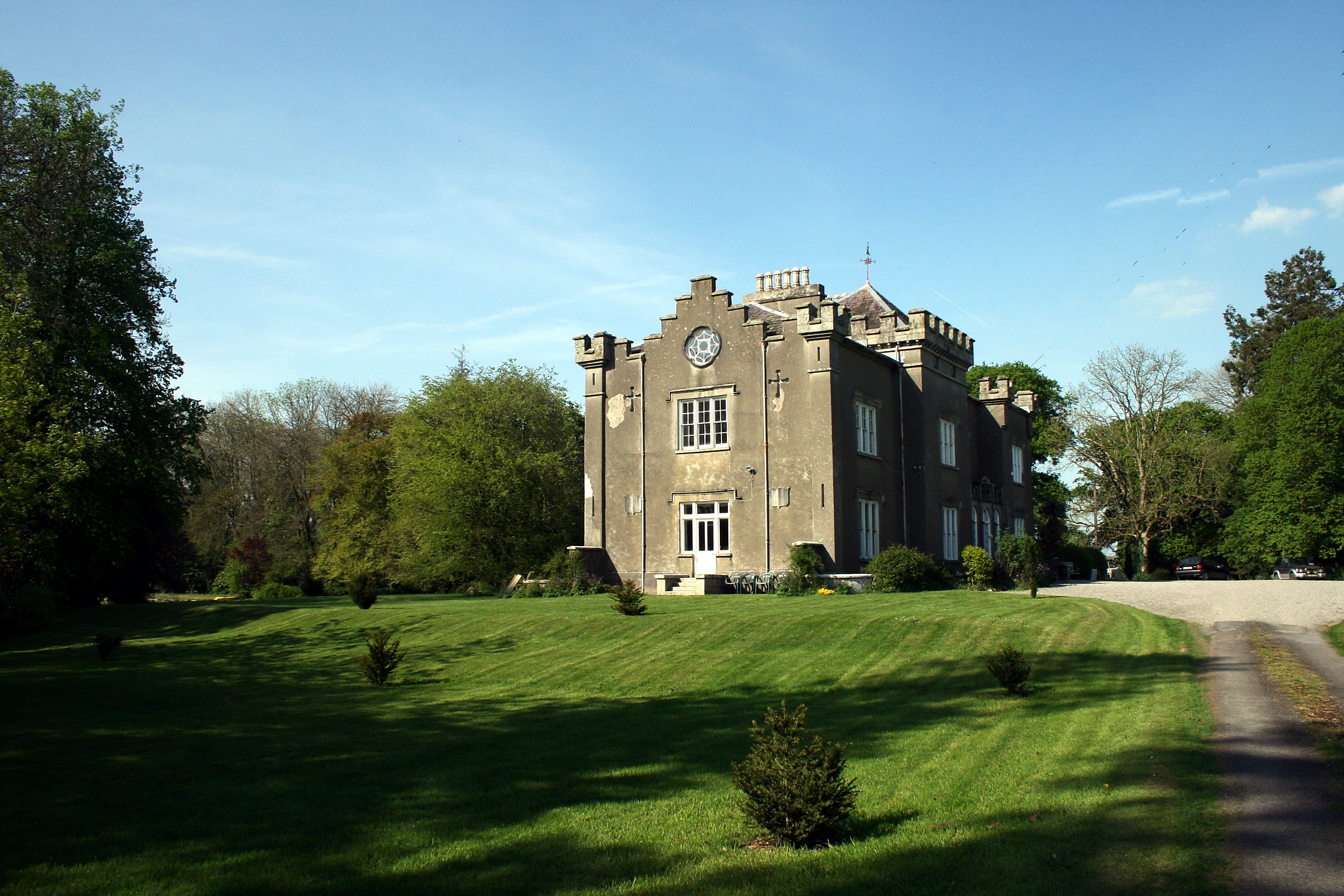
Shankill Castle

Shankill Castle started as a Butler tower-house near the ruins of an old church. Peter Aylward bought the lands from his wife's family, the Butlers, in 1708, and it was rebuilt and set in a formal landscape with a vista to the front and canal to the rear. In the 19th century, it was enlarged and castellated, serpentine bays added to the canal, and an unusual polyhedral sundial given a place of pride on a sunken lawn. Other additions were a gothic porch bearing the Aylward crest and a conservatory. The stable-yard and the castellated entrance to the demesne are attributed to Daniel Robertson. The interior preserves much of its 18th-century character and features including a Georgian staircase, Gothic plasterwork, and a Victorian drawing-room.

A branch of the Butler family, the Toler-Aylwards resided at Shankill until 1991 and some still live in the area of Kilkenny. Shankill is now home to the artist Elizabeth Cope and her husband Geoffrey. They have three children Phoebe Cope McCosh, Reuben Cope, and Sybil Cope. Shankill Castle hosts a residency programme for artists and creative professionals through ResArtis.

== Garden ==
In the garden, there are remnants of 18th-century lime alles, 19th-century laurel lawns. There are some Victorian favourites such as the now gigantic sequoias and 20th-century, self-sown ash trees. The moated garden, once a rose garden then forgotten and planted with Sitka spruces is now a spring garden, and the graveyard blooms all year round. The walled garden has an apple arch under-planted with red tulips and some antique goblet-shaped pear trees trained against a mellow brick wall.

Around Shankill Castle Gardens there are 3 significant trees which are included in the Tree Register of Ireland, compiled by the Tree Council of Ireland. These include a Commoime, a Wellingtonia Giant Sequoia and two Cupressus macrocarpa.

== See also ==
- Gardens in Ireland
- Gardens in Northern Ireland
