= Vauxhall (disambiguation) =

Vauxhall is a district in the London Borough of Lambeth. it may also refer to:

== Settlements ==
- Vauxhall, Auckland, a suburb on the North Shore of Auckland, New Zealand
- Vauxhall, Alberta, a town in Alberta, Canada
- Vauxhall, Birmingham, an area of Birmingham, England
- Vauxhall, Liverpool, an inner city area of Liverpool, England
- Vauxhall, Great Yarmouth, a holiday park in Great Yarmouth, England
- Vauxhall, New Jersey
- Vauxhall, Otago, a suburb of Dunedin, New Zealand

== Places ==
- Vauxhall station, a National Rail and London Underground station serving the London district
- Vauxhall Gardens, an 18th-century London pleasure garden
- New York Vauxhall Gardens, an 18th-century pleasure garden in New York City
- Vauxhall, Brussels, an 18th-century concert hall in Belgium
- Vauxhall (Gothenburg), an 18th-century pleasure garden in Sweden
- Washington Gardens (Boston), an early-18th-century Boston pleasure garden, also called Vauxhall

== Other ==
- Vauxhall (UK Parliament constituency)
- Vauxhall (electoral division), of the former Greater London Council
- Vauxhall (Lambeth ward), of Lambeth Borough Council
- Vauxhall (London County Council constituency)
- Vauxhall (Liverpool ward), of Liverpool City Council
- Vauxhall Motors, a British car company
- Vauxhall Motors F.C., an English football club in Ellesmere Port, Cheshire
- Vauxhall and I, a 1994 album by the British singer Morrissey
