= Via Manzoni =

Via Manzoni may refer to:

- Via Manzoni, Milan, Italy
- Via Manzoni, Naples, Italy
