= Via Manzoni, Naples =

Street in Naples, Italy

Via Alessandro Manzoni
- Interactive map of Via Alessandro Manzoni
- Length: 3.1 mi (5.0 km)
- Location: Naples, Italy
- Quarter: Posillipo, Chiaia
- Postal code: 80123
- From: Corso Europa
- To: Via Giovanni Boccaccio

Via Alessandro Manzoni, named after the writer Alessandro Manzoni, is one of the major streets of Naples. Located in the Posillipo quarter, at 5 kilometres (3.1 mi) in length it is the longest street in the area, forming, together with Via Posillipo and Via Petrarca, one of the main arterial roads of Posillipo.

== History ==
The earliest references to the street date from the 18th century, when a road following the modern route was recorded on the Map of the Duke of Noja of 1774 (sheets 17, 23, 24 and 30). The initial stretch of this old road, marked on the map as the "strada di Posillipo", started from the residence of Villa Patrizi, indicated as the "villa dell'avvocato Patrizio" ("villa of the lawyer Patrizio"). The route led to the villa known as "la Porta di Posillipo", corresponding to the modern Via di Porta Posillipo. Today's Via di Porta Posillipo is an alternative road, running parallel to Via Manzoni, situated on the hillside overlooking Fuorigrotta.

The old road then continued as the "strada di Villa Nuova", part of the hamlet of the same name, and later as the "via che porta al casale di S. Stratone" (the hamlet of Posillipo), reaching the place known as Torre di Raniero, that is Torre Ranieri, at the time owned by the family of the same name; from there, after a wide bend, the road actually reached the Casale di S. Stratone, corresponding to today's Via Pascoli.

In the second half of the 16th century, the most significant hamlets along the street arose, including Porta di Posillipo and Villanova, while Torre Ranieri dates back to medieval times. The other settlements along Via Manzoni still visible today include the already mentioned Villa Patrizi, built around the mid-18th century, and a considerable number of Neo-Renaissance and Rationalist residences built in the first half of the 20th century, among them:

- Villa Maria
- Villino at no. 141A
- Villa at no. 144A
- Villa Carmen
- Nocera-Improta town house, built by the banker Antonio Improta
- Masseria Vinaccia at no. 196
- Building at no. 237
- Building at no. 120
- Villa Rattazzi, which belonged to the then Italian Prime Minister Urbano Rattazzi
- Villa Ada
- Villa Aragona
- Villa Castiglione
- Villa d'Anna
- Castello de Vita, which belonged to the noble family of the same name
- Castello at no. 8
- Castello at no. 24
- Fatebenefratelli Hospital, formerly a college

The greatest wave of urbanisation, however, took place from the 1950s onward, when much of the city of Naples was affected, more than ever before, by the construction of new residential buildings.

The state scientific lyceum ("Liceo Scientifico Statale") "Tito Lucrezio Caro" is located on the street.

== Geography ==
The street runs along the entire ridge of the Posillipo hill, from Corso Europa to Parco Virgiliano. It is also the only street to face both the Gulf of Naples to the south, and Fuorigrotta, the Phlegraean Fields, Ischia, and Procida to the north. The street is served by ANM bus route C31.

== Points of interest ==
- Torre Ranieri
- Villa Patrizi
- Villa Maria
- Villino at no. 141A
- Villa at no. 144A
- Villa Carmen
- Palazzina di Nocera-Improta
- Masseria Vinaccia at no. 196
- Building at no. 237
- Building at no. 120
- Villa Rattazzi
- Villa Ada
- Villa Aragona
- Villa Castiglione
- Villa d'Anna
- Castello de Vita
- Castello at no. 8
- Castello at no. 24
- Fatebenefratelli Hospital, formerly a college

== Bibliography ==
- Carbonaro, Yvonne, and Luigi Cosenza. Le ville di Napoli. Newton Compton.
- Mazzitelli, A. L. Le pedamentine di Napoli.
- Stenti, Sergio, and Vito Cappiello. NapoliGuida e dintorni. Itinerari di architettura moderna. CLEAN.

== See also ==
- Villas of Naples
