= Neiraku Museum =

Art museum in Nara, Japan

Coordinates: 34.6860°N 135.8371°E

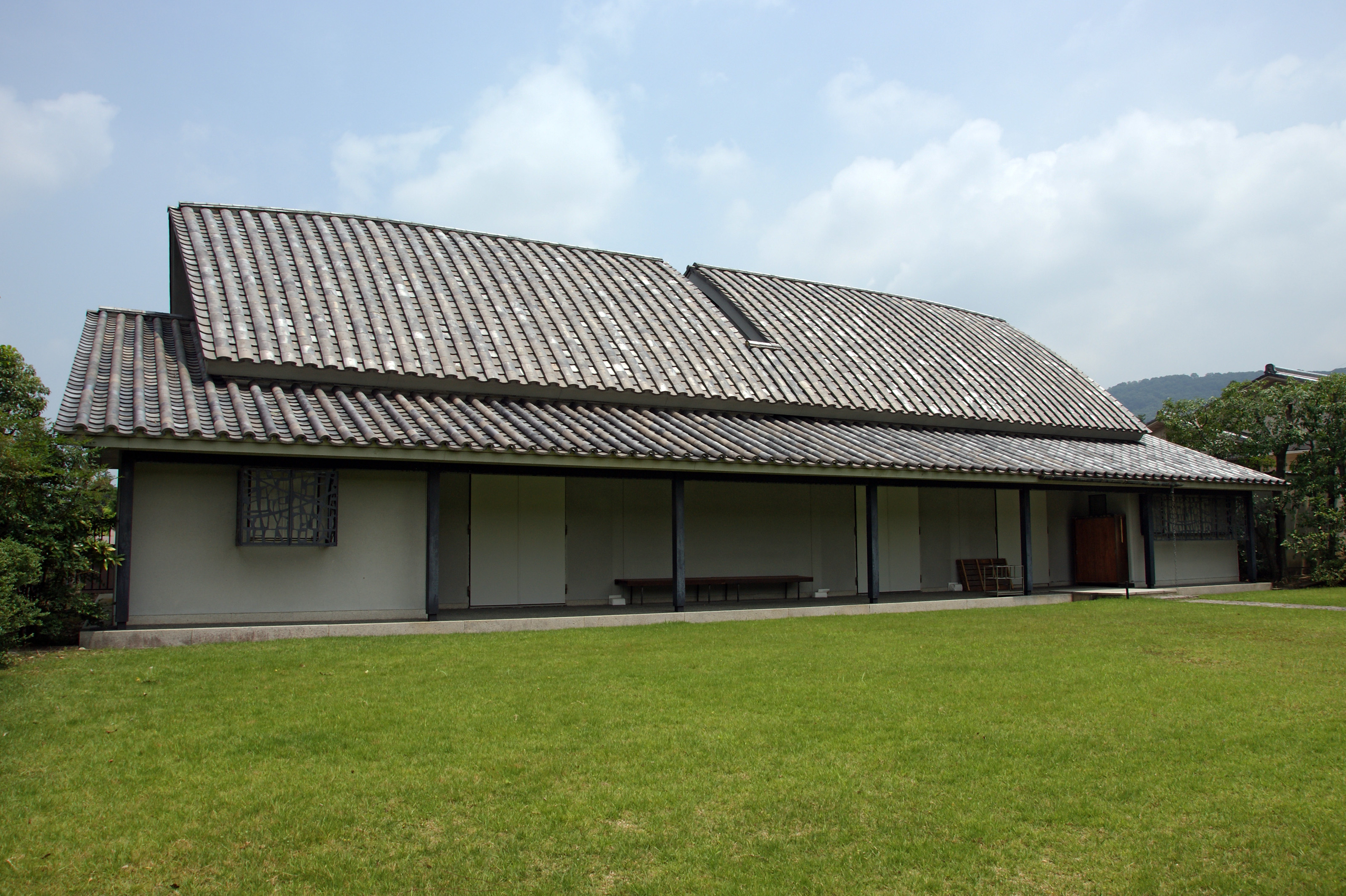
Neiraku Museum

Neiraku Museum (寧楽美術館, Neiraku Bijitsukan) is an art museum in the city of Nara, central Japan.

The museum opened in April 1969. It contains the works collected by Nakamura Junsaku (1875–1953), who was the founder of the Isuien Garden. The collection totals over 2000 items, which includes bronze wares, seals and mirrors of ancient China as well as pottery of ancient Korea. The museum building was built in a traditional style and features rotating exhibitions.
