= Episcopal Palace, Braga =

Archiepiscopal Palace of Braga
- Paço Arquiepiscopal de Braga
- A view of the archiepiscopal palace of Braga as seen from the garden of Santa Bárbara

General information
- Type: Episcopal Palace
- Architectural style: Portuguese Northern Baroque
- Location: Braga (São José de São Lázaro e São João do Souto), Braga, Portugal
- Coordinates: 41°33′3″N 8°25′34.2″W
- Owner: Portuguese Republic

Technical details
- Material: Granite

Design and construction
- Architect: Fernandes de Sá

The Archiepiscopal Palace of Braga (Portuguese: Paço Arquiepiscopal de Braga), is a Portuguese episcopal palace in civil parish of Braga (São José de São Lázaro e São João do Souto), in the municipality of the same name, in the northern district of Braga.

== History ==
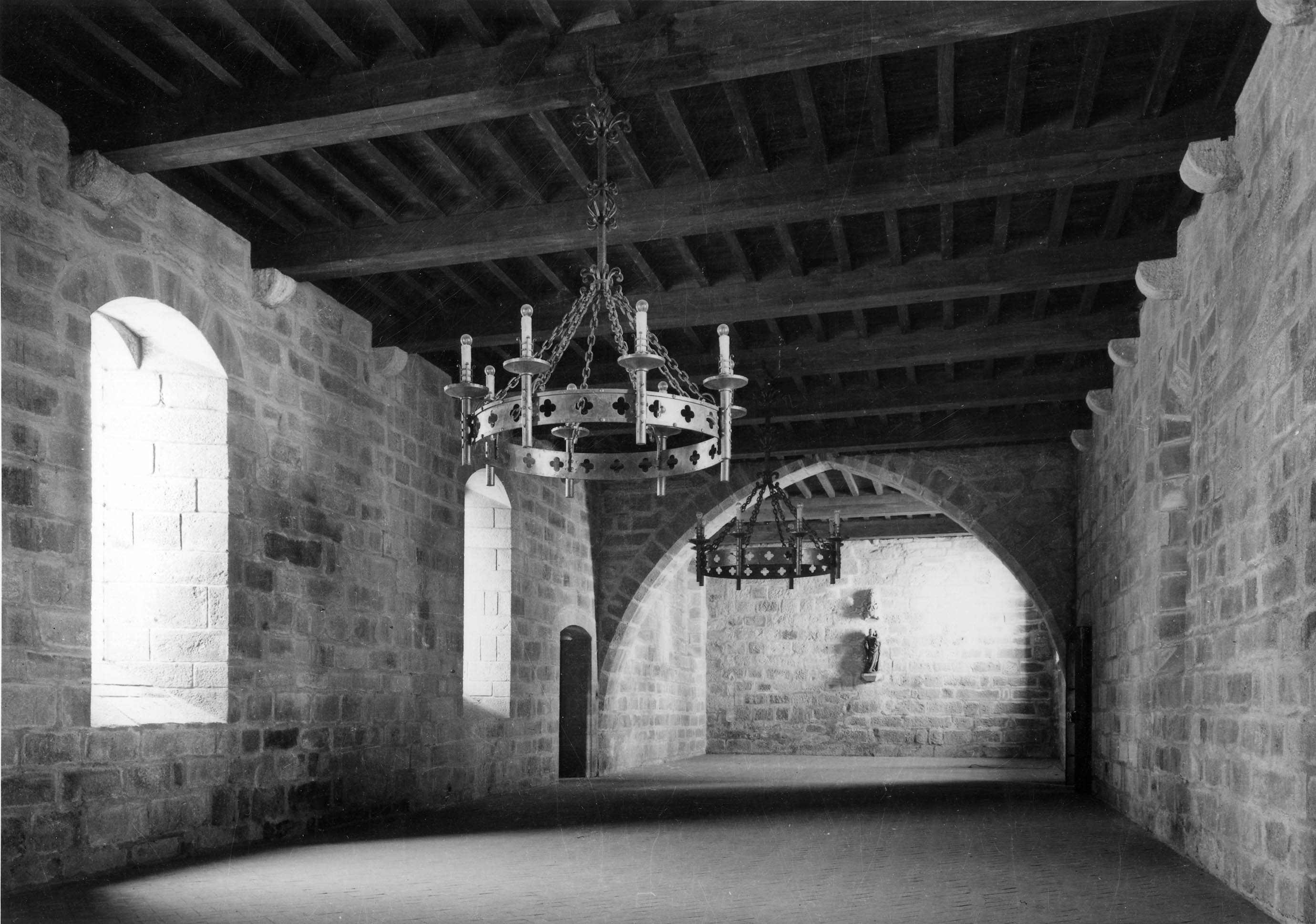
A view of one of the cavernous halls in the older wings

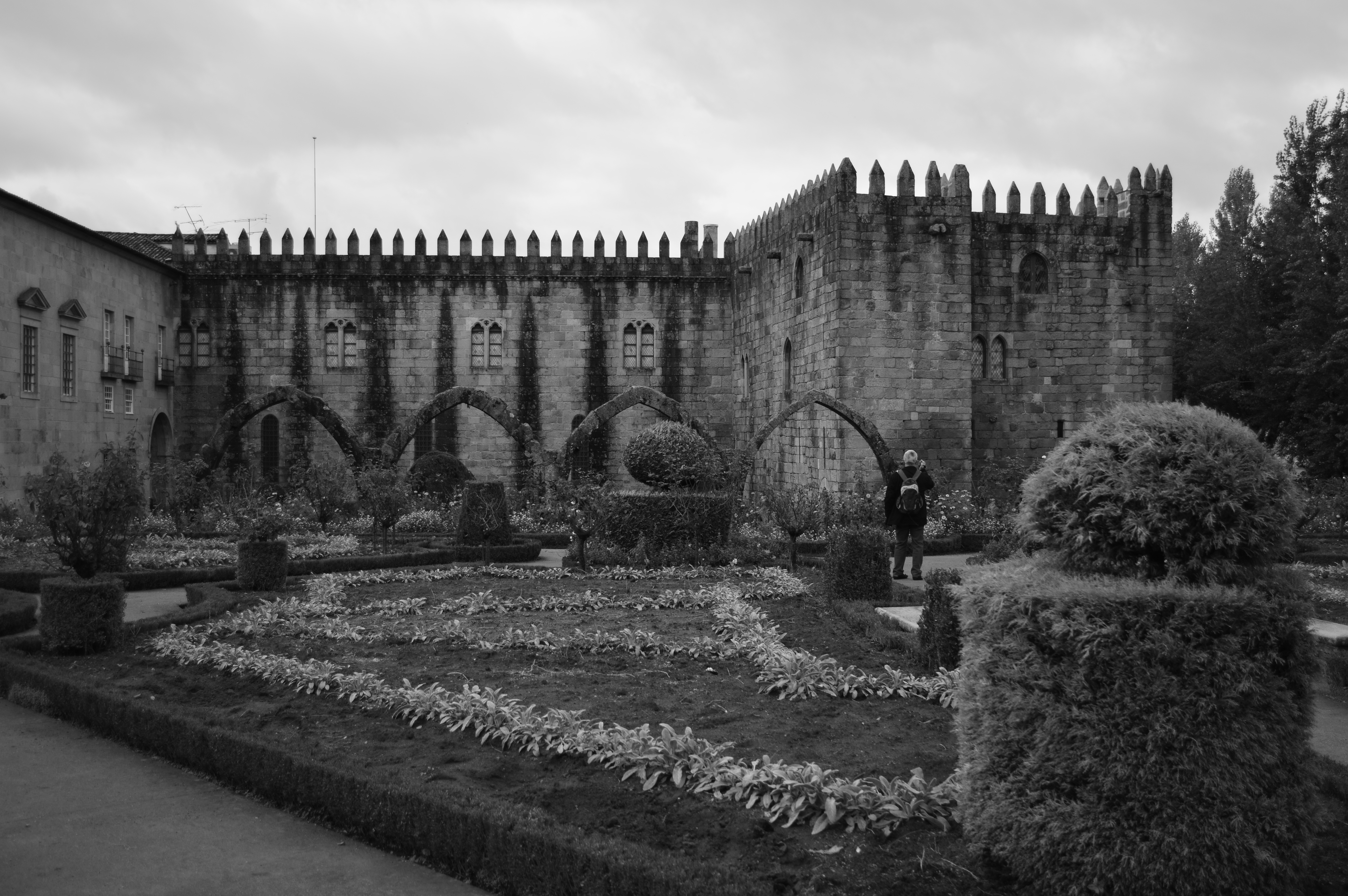
The medieval wing, including the remains of the 1834 wing burned by fire

The archiepiscopal court with one of the fountains

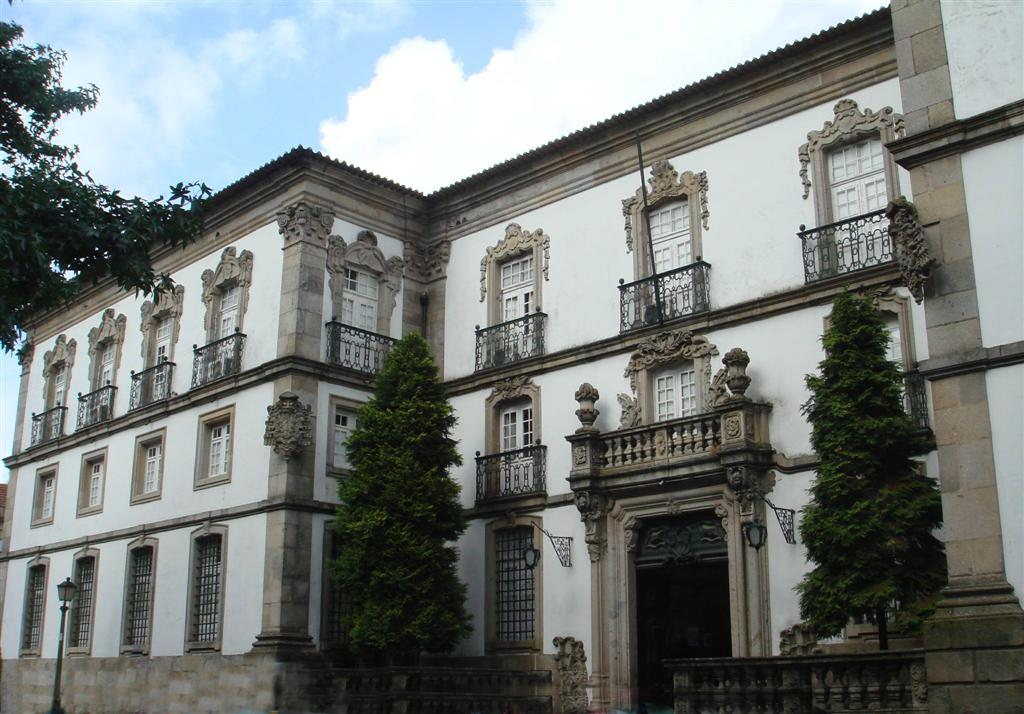
The Baroque wing of the archiepsicopal palace

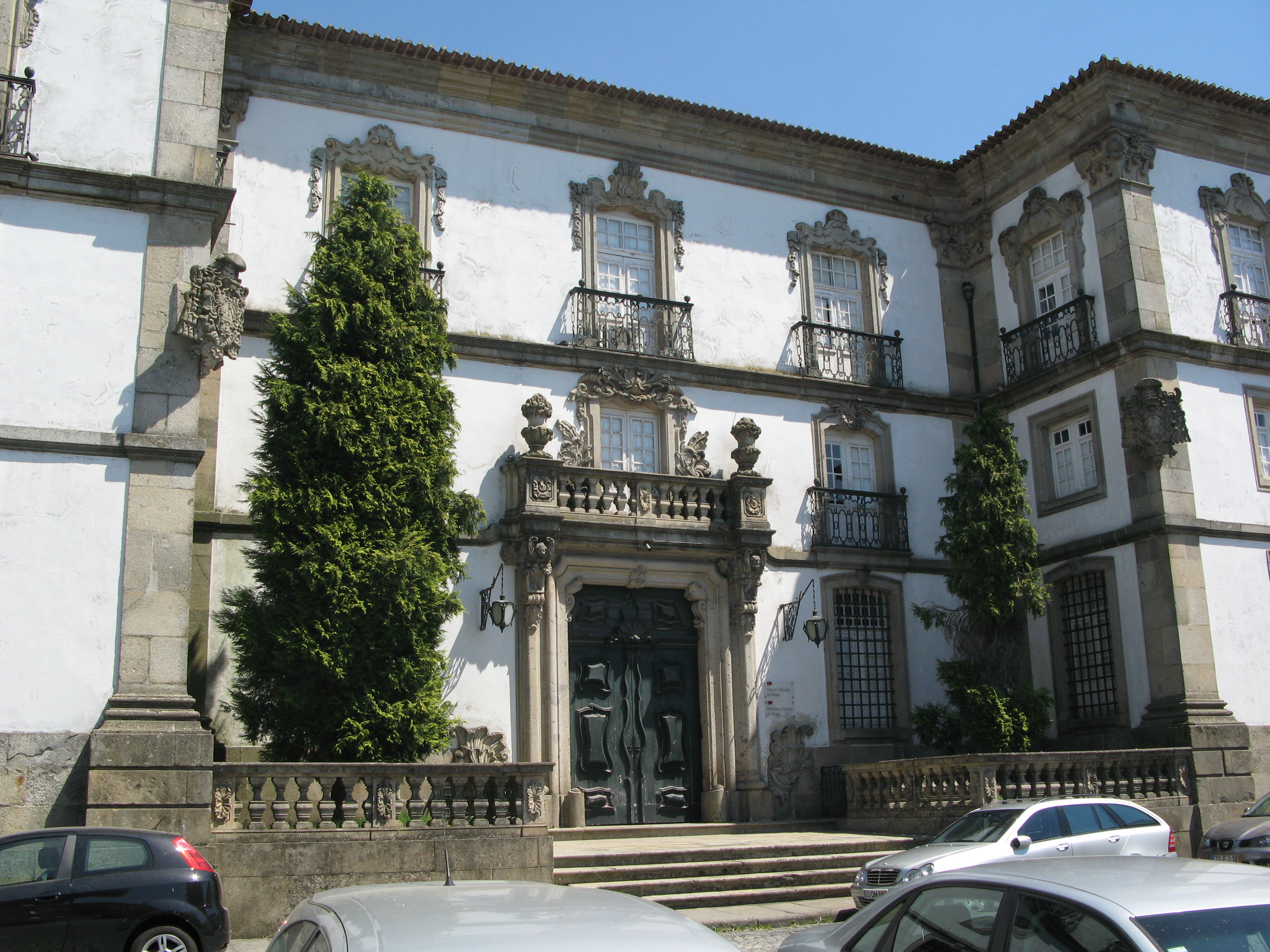
The entranceway of the Public Library and District Archive in the Barque wing

The Bishopric of Bracara was founded in 388 by Paternus, who became the first bishop of Braga. Officially, the archbishopric of Braga was founded in 1071, turning D. Pedro its first archbishop. Between 1096 and 1112, Count D. Henrique and Countess D. Teresa were the masters of Braga, leading in 1112 to a letter donating the city to the archbishops, instituting an ecclesiastical fiefdom, that would last to the 18th century. D. Maurício Burdino became the first ecclesiastical master of Braga. On 27 May 1128, Archbishop D. Pai Mendes received a confirmation letter to expand church lands, along with the privilege to mint coin, in recompense for his support of D. Afonso Henriques' revolt against his mother, the Countess D. Teresa.

In 1327, D. Afonso IV invaded the jurisdiction of then-archbishop D. Gonçalo Pereira, grandfather of D. Nuno Álvares Pereira, nominating public notaries to the crown for Braga. The archbishop excommunicated and expelled these notaries from the city. This antagonism resulting from these acts never diminished, and in 1341, when regal authorities entered the new city, the archbishop excommunicated them as well. As a consequence, the Corregedor Afonso Domingues took the castle and municipal hall, which were much later returned to the archbishop by D. Afonso IV. It was following this antagonism that the construction of the primitive archiepiscopal palace was begun, by Archbishop D. Gonçalo Pereira in 1336.

In 1361, D. João de Cardaillac, began to use the title of Arcebispo Primaz das Hespanhas (Archbishop Primate of the Hispanias). In 1402, the archbishop, D. Martinho Afonso de Miranda, ceded jurisdiction of the city to the Crown, in exchange for land rents and other concessions. At that time regulations obliged farmers and craftsmen to support the repair of the palace. Between 1422 and 1436, Archbishop D. Fernando da Guerra, great-grandson of D. Pedro I and D. Inês de Castro, ordered the reconstruction and expansion of the archiepiscopal structure, with Gil Vasques (carpenter), Fernão Martins (master of public works) and João Gonçalves (stonemason) steering the build. By 1439, the tower was concluded.

In 1472, D. Afonso V restored to the archbishop D. Luís Pires, the temporary jurisdiction of Braga and its surroundings to the archbishopric, allowing the archbishops to use the title Senhores de Braga e Primazes das Hespanhas (Masters of Braga and Primates of Hispania). Yet, this détente was short lived; D. Fernão de Lima, a noble who lived in Braga, began a war with the Archbishop, resulting in various bloody skirmishes between the two factions. By 1478, the Duke of Braganza put an end to the battles between the Archbishop and Lima.

Between 1505 and 1532, Archbishop D. Diogo de Sousa ordered changes at the palace, including the erection of the Fonte dos Castelos, in the Largo do Paço, which lead to the 1545-1549 construction of the northern wing, by Archbishop D. Manuel de Sousa and the 1594 construction of the western wing in the Largo do Paço, by Archbishop D. Agostinho de Jesus.

In 1709, Archbishop D. Rodrigo de Moura Teles expanded the building, altering the facades of wings oriented to the Largo do Paço and erecting a chapel. Between 1740 and 1750, the Archbishop of D. José de Bragança, further expanded the palace, ordering the construction of the Baroque wing oriented to the municipal square. This was further enriched between 1758 and 1789, when Archbishop D. Gaspar de Bragança expanded the library, with a number of notable documents.

In the second half of the 19th century, D. Miguel and his cortege installed himself in the archiepiscopal palace, spending his time in Braga at the bullfights in the municipal square. By 1834, the archbishops were confined to the wing overlooking the eastern edge of the Largo do Paço, as the prefecture of Minho is installed in the building, with much later the Civil Governor of Minho and offices of other services. On 15 April 1866, there was a violent fire that destroyed the Baroque wing oriented towards the municipal square, in addition to the contents of the D. Gaspar de Bragança's library, gutting his collection. By 1871, the ruins of the wing were demolished and many of the stones collected.

By 1903, many of the facades exposed to the Largo do Paço were plastered and painted, with the walls constructed from wood and mortar. In 1911, the archbishops were expelled definitively from the episcopal palace, and the 8th infantry regiment, courts and municipal firefighters installed in the building. By order of the Comissão Central dos Bens Eclesiásticos (Central Commission for Ecclesiastical Property) on 18 November 1912, following the upheaval caused by the Republican revolution and schism with the church, many of the possessions of the clergy were sold off, including five fountains in the interior gardens (to the Brotherhood of Senhora do Parto for 10$00). On 28 March 1918, the building was ceded to the Ministério de Instrução Pública (Ministry of Public Instruction) and wing occupied by the archbishops was converted into the first Museum D. Diogo de Sousa. By 1920, Dr. Alberto Feio solicited the building to be adapted into a library and archive. The following year, though, the chapel of D. José Bragança was gutted by fire. The project to expand the episcopal palace was drawn up in 1922 for the new library and archive, even as the west wing was stilled occupied by the regimental garrison.

In 1930, the episcopal palace underwent profound public works to transform and remodel the building for its use as public library of Braga and district archive. The intention to demolish the eight buildings that surrounded the interior patio was advanced and reconstruction of the Baroque wing. By 1934, the public works were concluded the Baroque wing, under the direction of engineer Almeida Freira, and on 1 December the Public Library of Braga was inaugurated. Throughout 1936 various storms caused damage to the building, resulting in reconstruction projects in the following year, under the direction of Jorge Viana and Fernandes de Sá, that only be concluded in 1939. But, in 1941, a major storm caused damage to the building.

In 1943, the process to expropriation of the eight buildings for the construction of an ethnographic museum was interrupted with the death of engineer Duarte Pacheco. António Maria dos Santos da Cunha proposed the removal of the grades that encircled the Largo do Paço this year, but the project would not advance. The facade oriented to Largo D. João Peculiar was being restored in 1944, while the following year a chapel was demolished along the northeast, in order to expand the Rua Eça de Queirós. This became part of the 1946 project to re-landscape the Largo do Paço, that included the suppression of the grade that encircled the parcel.

Between 1947 and 1948, the library was under the control of the Ministério da Educação Nacional (Ministry of National Education). In 1947, there was an intention by the municipality to demolish the municipal market, located in the middle of the Praça do Munícipio, in order to open-up the Baroque wing of the palace and Municipal Hall.

Architect Francisco de Azeredo presented a project to re-landscape the municipal square in 1948, even as the following year the medieval episcopal square was still in construction and the process of selecting new furniture continued to evolve.

On 18 September 1948, a dispatch was issue to define a Special Protection Zone, by the Direção-Geral de Urbanização (Directorate-General for Urbanization).

New projects to re-arrange the Municipal Square initiated in 1950, which were later expanded with the 1955 construction of the Garden of Santa Bárbara. Around 14 July, the landscapers were authorized to remove the grading along the Largo do Paço and opening up the square to Rua do Souto. This task was only begun the following, with the execution of the demolition of the municipal market. In 1964, by municipal decision the five elements of the Fonte do Pelicano, which was encountered dismantled in the episcopal garden were moved to the Praça do Município and reconstructed.

In 1973, the Direcção-Geral de Construções Escolares (Directorate-General of School Construction) proceeded to adapt the central an eastern wings (oriented to the Largo da Praça for there use as installations of the University of Moinho's rectory. The wing destined for the Museu D. Diogo de Sousa and a majority of the dependencies were unoccupied, with only the first floor occupied by artisanal shop of the municipal tourist centre, the district courts and the second floor occupied by the Alliance Française and Instituto Minhoto de Estudos Regionais. But, by 1975, the library was integrated into the directorship of the University of Moinho and two years later the Museum D. Diogo de Sousa abandoned their spaces.

== Architecture ==
The former court was constructed on an unleveled terrain in the historic centre of Braga. The building is addorsed to buildings along its eastern and western edge, with the cathedral of Braga and Church of the Misericórdia, to the southwest, and municipal hall and Fonte de Pelicano, to the west. In the northeast is the Garden of Santa Bárbara, on level ground, a geometric area delimited by shrubs and decorated with cedar topiaries. In the centre is an octagonal fountain, on four steps, with circular column surmounted by an image of Santa Barbara. Delimiting this patio are the ruins of a broken arcade pertaining to the medieval episcopal palace.

The Palace is a set of three different buildings with distinct characteristics and time periods. The irregular building is asymmetrical composition, consisting of three bodies, that are also irregularly designed and constructed in different epochs, that are addorsed and interconnected. The medieval corp is associated with a rectangular garden patio oriented towards the Garden of Santa Bárbara, addorsed to the southern 15th century U-shaped wing and rectangular square, known as the Largo do Paço. At the junction of these in the west, is designated the Baroque Wing, oriented to the Largo do Município. This body is the most formal, with a three-register symmetrical structure with recessed central body and lateral wings. All unique buildings are of varying heights and covered in different roofing materials.

=== Southern wing ===
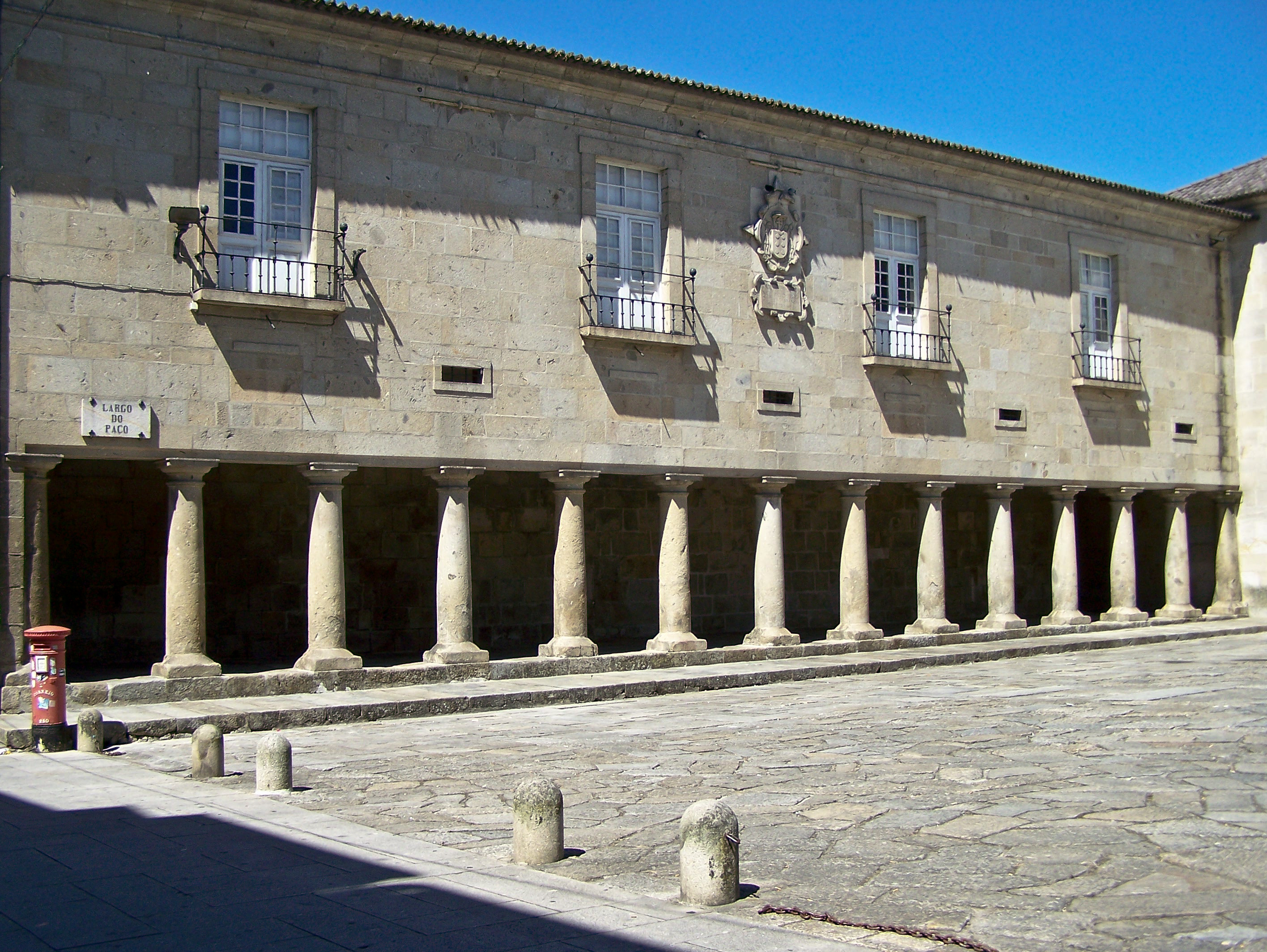
The eastern colonnade showing the imperious Roman-like pillars

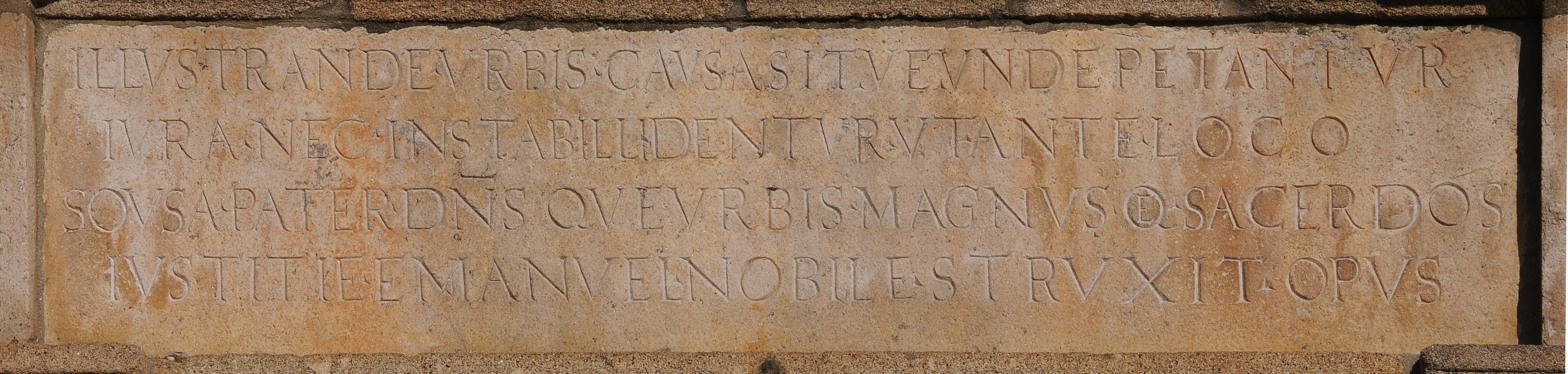
One of the inscriptions at the edge of the eastern wing

The South wing, defining the Paço Square, is composed of various buildings from the 16th, 17th and 18th centuries. Access to the complex occurs across the 15th century body, consisting of a two- to three-register structure on a slight terrain, constructed of granite, except for the portion oriented to the encircled Largo D. João Peculiar (which is plastered and white-washed). The facades of the buildings are decorated in cornices and marked by several vertical rectangular vains. The facades to the Largo do Paço, with wings covered in grated-windows and surmounted by rectangular cornices on the first register and more simple rectangular windows on the second floor, with guardrails. The central wing with principal entranceway is flanked by pilasters, crowned by ornate pinnacle and surmounted by the coat-of-arms of Archbishop D. Rodrigo Moura Teles.

The eastern wing includes two panels of walls separated by colossal Roman-like pilasters. On the left is a doorway flanked by pilasters and decorated by a coat-of-arms in the timpany, between lateral windows, also flanked by pilasters. To the right, there are two porticos flanked identical windows one framed by pilasters, crowned by inscription and coat-of-arms, and the other framed and decorated. This wing is to the south (towards Rua do Souto) with identical inscription, but with windows between registers and window in the mezzanine.

The western wing, with gallery is supported by colonnade and recumbent windows with coat-of-arms of Archbishop D. Agostinho de Jesus in the centre. This wing to the south, oriented towards the Largo D. João Peculiar at the corner, in the last register, closed balcony, crowned by pinnacles, supported by great balcão fechado, em empena coroada por pináculos, suportado por grandes corbels and windows.

In the Largo do Paço is a central fountain, known as the Fonte dos Castelos, a polygonal structure with twelve steps, poly-lobed tank, and a column with sculptured hexagonal and six fountains. The ornate fountain includes a secondary tank sculpted in the form of interconnected castles linked by wall surrounding a pinnacle carved as a three register tower, surmounted by a statue crowned with armillary sphere topped by patriarchal cross.

=== Eastern wing ===
The Eastern wing (facing the Santa Barbara Garden is of Gothic style and dates to the 14th and 15th centuries.

=== Western wing ===
The Western wing (facing the Municipio Square) was built in the 18th century in the Portuguese Northern Baroque style.
