= Yoshiki-en =

Japanese garden in Nara, Japan

Coordinates: 34°41′08″N 135°50′11″E

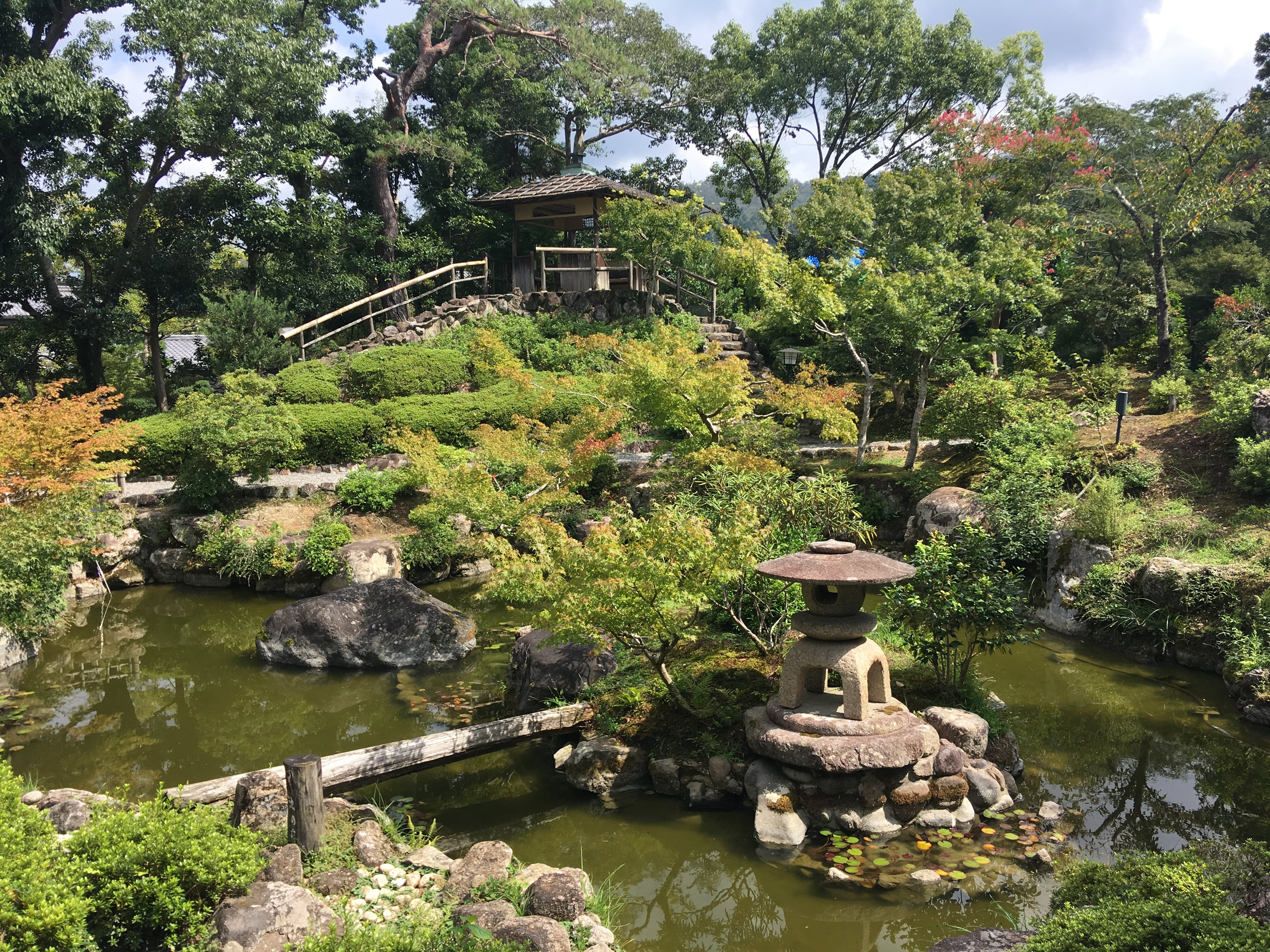

Yoshiki-en (吉城園) is a Japanese garden in Nara, Japan, to the immediate southwest of Isui-en.

== History ==
Adjacent to Yoshiki-en flows the Yoshiki River (宣寸川 or 吉城川), celebrated in the Man'yōshū. According to an old plan of Kōfuku-ji (興福寺古絵図), the site was occupied until the Edo period by one of its branch temples, Manishu-in (摩尼珠院). The land became private property during the Meiji period. In 1919 the residence and gardens were laid out. The gardens have been open to the public since the end of the Shōwa period. In 2011 the garden residence was designated a Prefectural Cultural Property.

== Gardens ==
The gardens consist of a pond garden, moss garden with tea house, and camellia garden.

== Residence ==
Twelve component structures of the Taishō-period Former Shōhōin Family Residence (旧正法院家住宅) have been jointly designated a Prefectural Cultural Property, seven in the main residence (the north, central, and south buildings, north entrance corridor, south corridor, and two earthen storehouses), three in the detached residence, an arbour, and the front gate, along with supplementary designations of two munefuda (棟札) or inscriptions relating to the building, fencing, and twelve painted fusuma panels; the last, formerly part of the Crane Room and Spring Orchid Room, were removed in 2006 and are now in the Nara Prefectural Museum of Art.

== See also ==
- List of parks and gardens of Nara Prefecture
