= Mokuan =

Given name

- Language: Japanese

Mokuan may refer to:

- Mokuan Reien (died 1345), Japanese painter during the Muromachi Period
- Muyan (Japanese: Mokuan Shoto, 1611–1684), Chinese Chan monk and a founder of the Ōbaku Zen school in Japan
