= Gardens in Northern Ireland =

The following are gardens in Northern Ireland, including any garden open to the public.

- Belfast Botanic Gardens
- Castlewellan Arboretum & Annesley Garden, Castlewellan, County Down
- Clandeboye Estate, Bangor, County Down
- Drenagh, Limavady, County Londonderry
- Mount Stewart, Newtownards, County Down
- Rowallane Garden, Saintfield, County Down

== See also ==
- Register of Parks, Gardens and Demesnes of Special Historic Interest
- Historic houses in Northern Ireland
- List of gardens
- Gardens in England
- Gardens in Wales
- Gardens in Scotland
- Gardens in the Republic of Ireland
