= Penedo da Saudade =

Historical public garden in Coimbra, Portugal

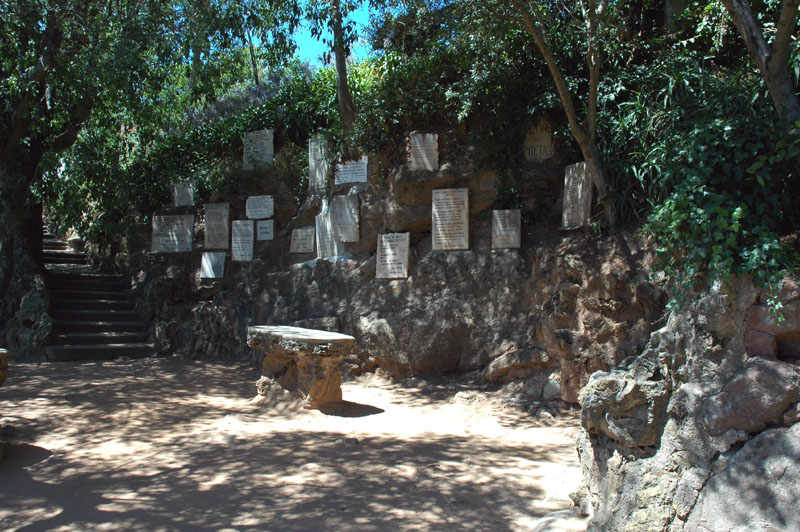
- Type: Garden
- Location: Coimbra, Portugal
- Coordinates: 40.2052°N 8.4146°W
- Created: 1849

Penedo da Saudade, previously known as Pedra dos Ventos (Boulder of the Winds) is a historical public garden built in 1849 in Coimbra, Portugal. The garden is bounded to the north and west by Avenida Dr. Marnoco e Sousa and faces south and east, with panoramic views of the Mondego River, the Coimbra skyline and the Coimbra City Stadium.

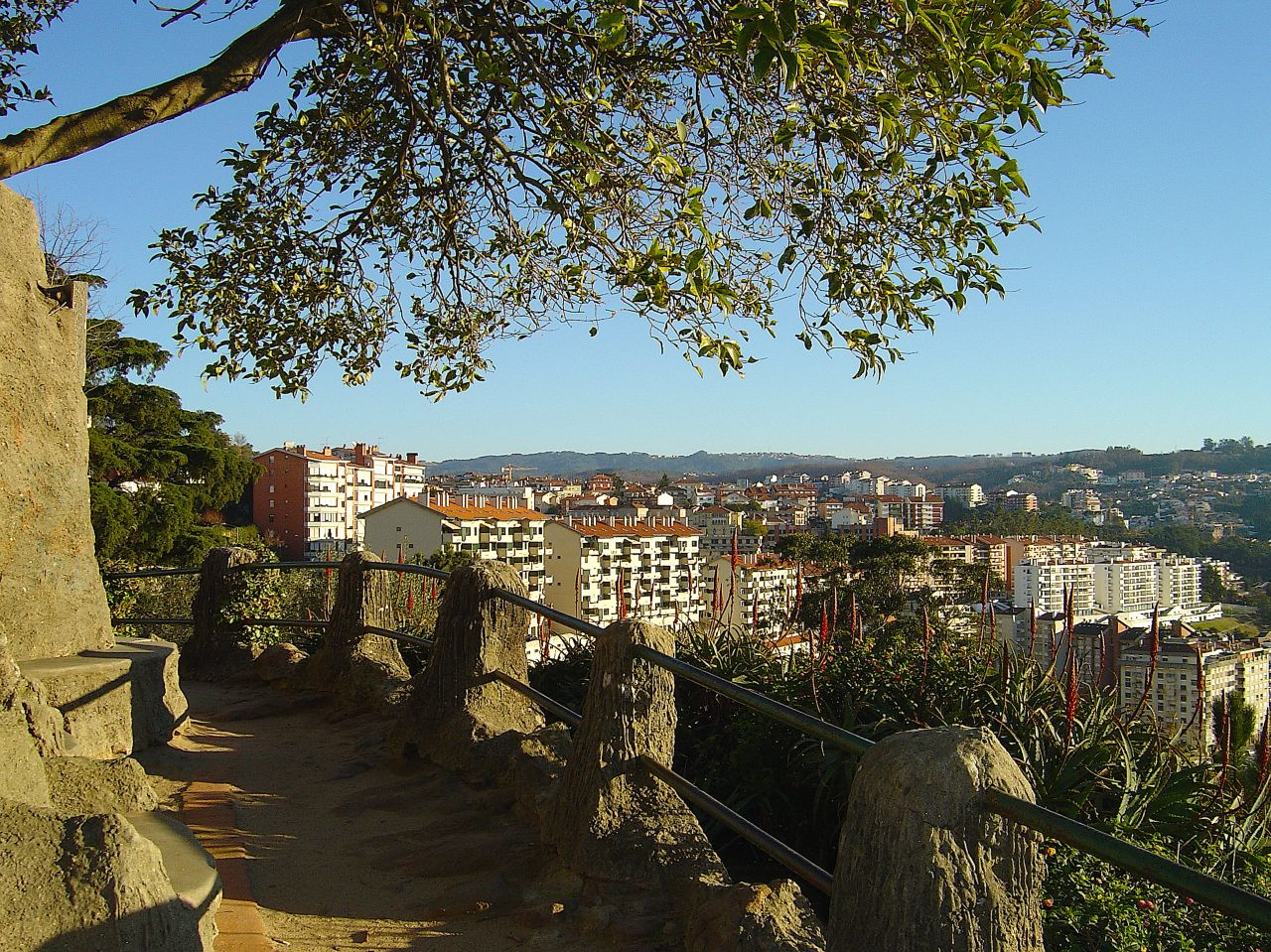
View from Penedo da Saudade

The garden is arranged on a series of terraces ("socalcos") built along the hillside, featuring built-in benches. It begins with an elevated platform serving as a promenade garden, enclosed to the north by a walkway and parking area. A central axis paved with Portuguese pavement runs through the garden, flanked by plane trees and hedges. The steep slopes defining the terraces are covered with shrubs and herbaceous plants, with trees mainly at the top of the terraces. A long winding walkway leads down the hill through a wooded area, from the main section of the garden all the way down to Infanta Dona Maria street.

In 2021, the Coimbra City Council approved a project to expand and improve Jardim Penedo da Saudade. This project aimed to create new green spaces, construct and rehabilitate pathways, and upgrade vegetation, infrastructure, and urban furniture. The expansion would integrate the garden with the surrounding hillside extending to Rua Infanta Dona Maria, transforming it into a larger urban park accessible to a broader audience. The renovation also includes the requalification of Avenida Marnoco e Sousa and Largo do Penedo da Saudade, which involves creating a greener reception plaza, installing a kiosk with an esplanade, and reconfiguring roadways and parking. These interventions aimed to improve security, public lighting, and overall accessibility, including provisions for people with reduced mobility.

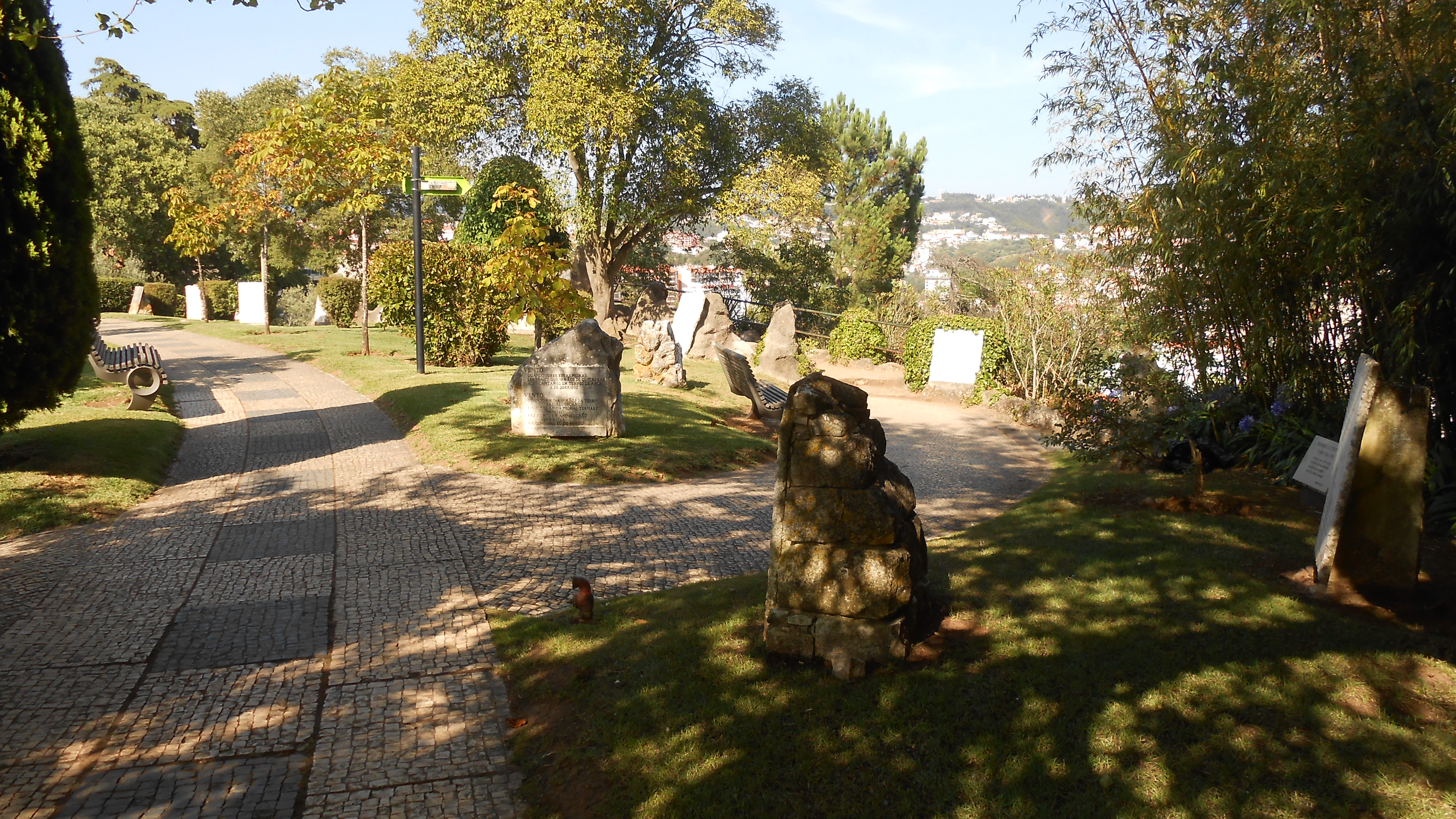
Walkway in Portuguese pavement

== Association with Peter I and Inês de Castro ==
Jardim Penedo da Saudade has long been associated with the tragic love story of King Peter I and Inês de Castro. According to legend, it is said that Peter would retreat to the garden's location to mourn the loss of his beloved Inês. The romantic atmosphere of the garden, with its panoramic views and melancholic inscriptions, has inspired numerous poets, particularly during the Romantic era. João de Deus adapted a Latin composition by Santos Valente titled Penedo da Saudade, which mentions the "tears of mad longing" that Peter is said to have shed at this site.

== Notable features ==
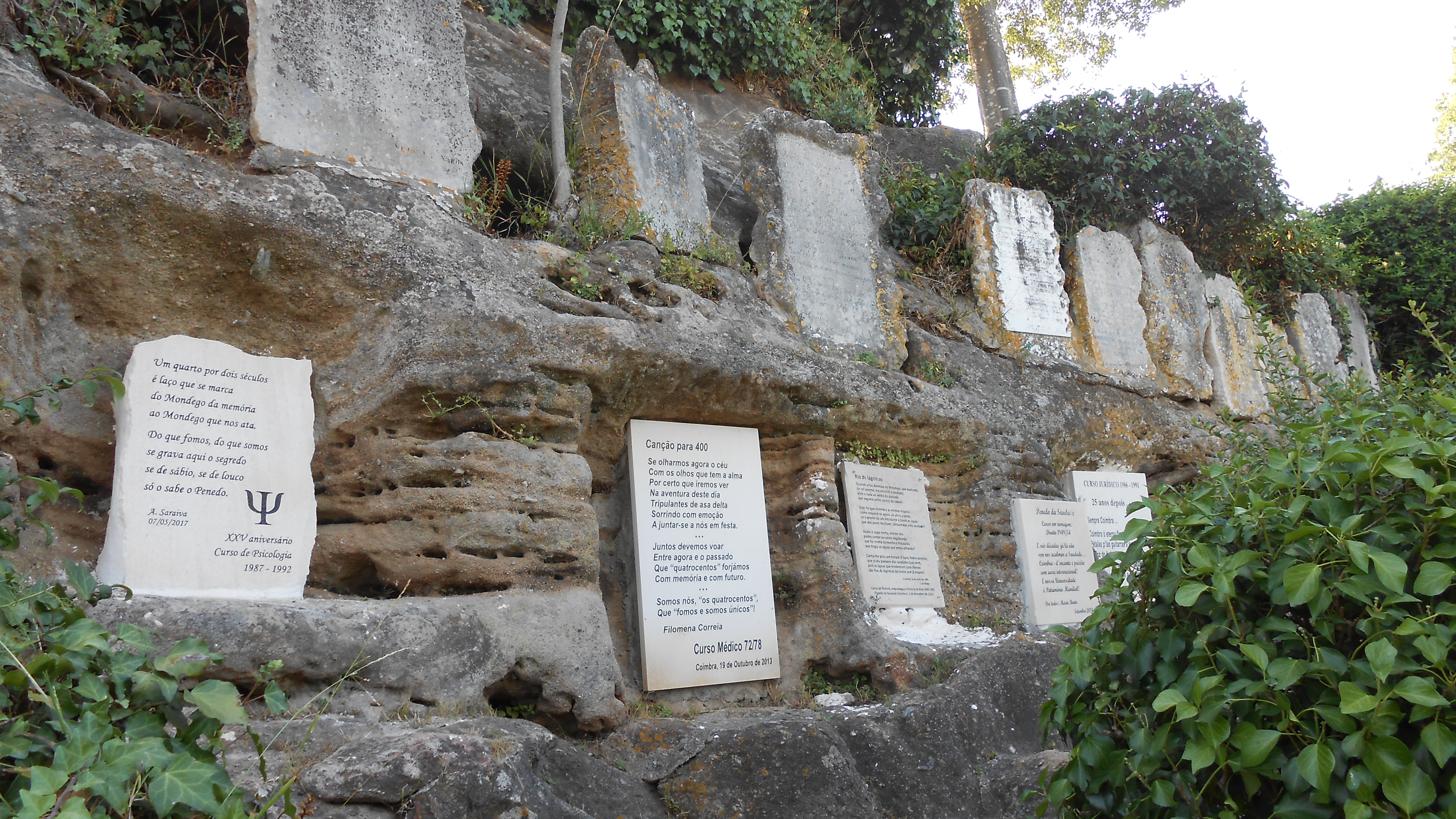
Poems in stone slabs

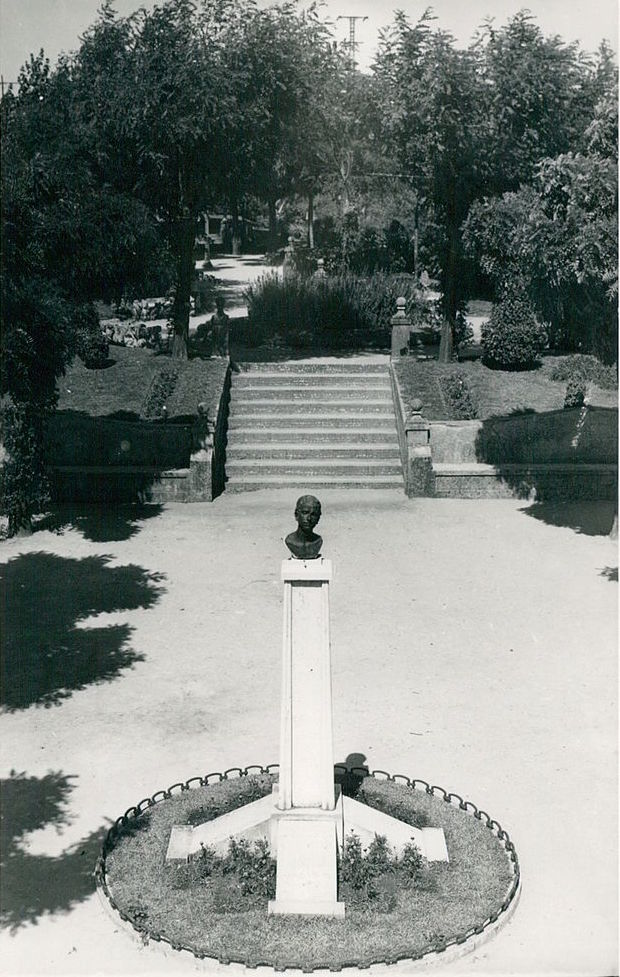
Monument to António Nobre

There are many stone slabs with poems and songs from past students of the University throughout the garden and in particular in the sections Retiro dos Poetas (Poets' Retreat) and the Sala dos Cursos (Courses Room). One of these poems is by Fausto Guedes Teixeira, and it describes the nostalgic beauty of the location.

In addition to these features, the garden hosts several sculptures and busts of prominent Portuguese literary and cultural figures. A notable landmark is the statue of the pedagogue and poet João de Deus, created by sculptor Jorge Coelho. This statue was commissioned by the Associação dos Jardins-Escola João de Deus and inaugurated on May 11, 1996, as part of the centenary commemorations of João de Deus's death.

Another important monument in the garden is the bust of the renowned writer Eça de Queirós. The sculpture was commissioned by the Coimbra City Council and created by sculptor Francisco Simões. It was unveiled on September 8, 2000, coinciding with the International Congress of Queirosian Studies, which marked the centenary of the writer's death.

The garden also features a bust of the poet António Nobre inaugurated on October 30, 1939, as an initiative of the Coimbra City Council. Originally sculpted by Tomás Costa, the bust was stolen in 1942 but later recovered and reinstalled, before being stolen again in 1991. The current bust is a replica of a similar bust of the same author, which can also be found in the Jardim da Cordoaria in Porto.
