= Jameson Park and Rose Garden =

South African rose garden

Coordinates: 29°49′37″S 31°00′31″E

Jameson Park and Rose Garden is a rose garden located in Durban, South Africa.

Once being a pineapple plantation, it currently possesses about 200 species of roses which are prominent in the South African Spring months of September to November. Jameson Park is open publicly every day of the year and is completely free of cost. The park is now famous for its display of blooms unsurpassed in beauty and variety and is ample proof that roses flourish in a humid subtropical climate.
