= Shofu-en =

Traditional garden in Fukuoka, Japan

Shōfū-en
- 松風園
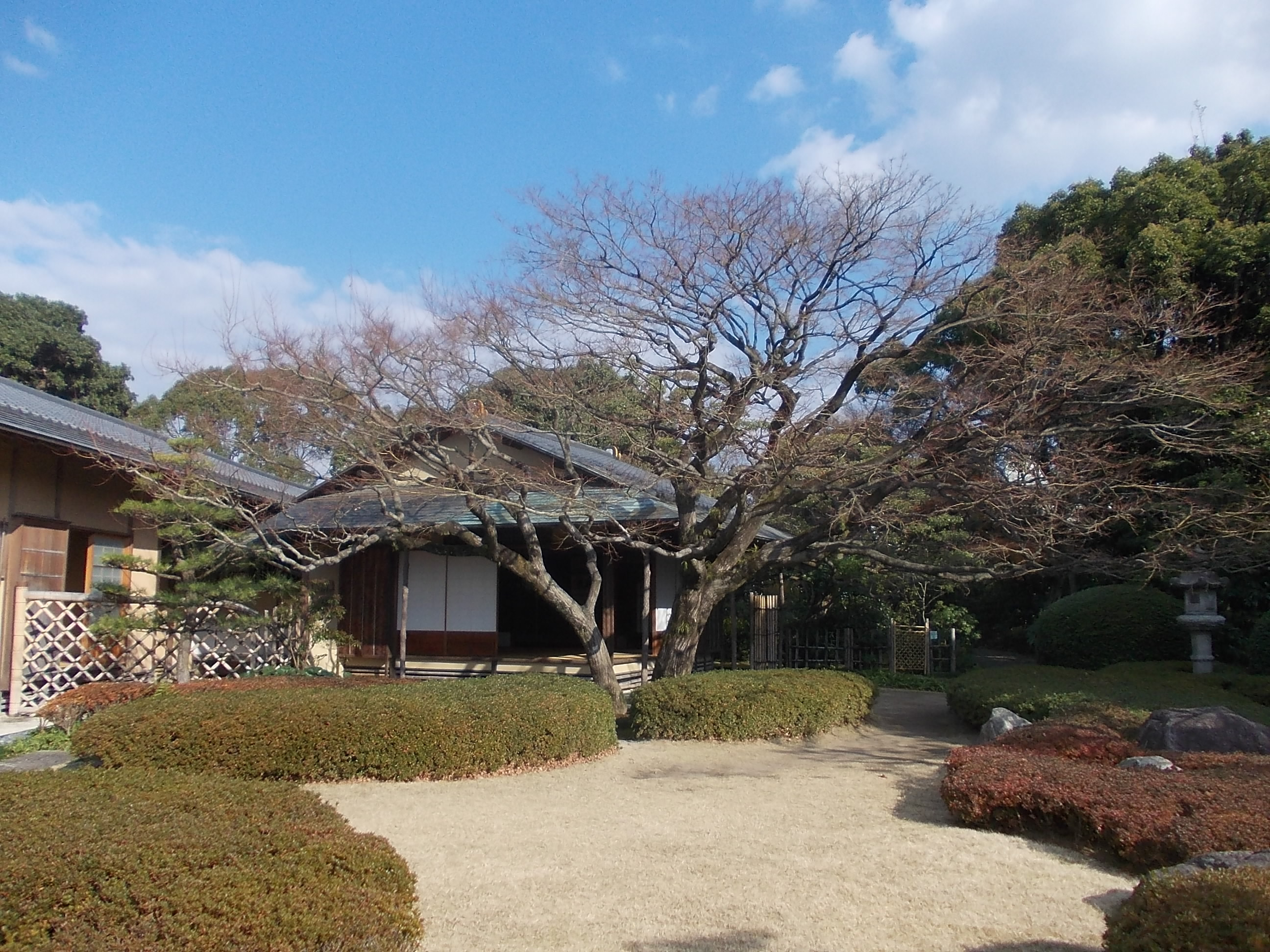
- Shōfū-en's tea ceremony room
- Interactive map of Shōfū-en
- Type: Japanese Garden
- Location: Fukuoka City, Fukuoka Prefecture
- Coordinates: 33.5740545°N 130.3961686°E
- Area: 2405.2
- Created: 2007
- Opened: July 1, 2007
- Founder: Zenpachi Tanakamaru
- Operator: The city of Fukuoka

Shōfū-en (松風園) is a Japanese garden attached to a former tea ceremony room in Chuo-ku, Fukuoka, Japan.

== History ==
The Shōfū-en garden was built in early 1950s by Zenpachi Tanakamaru, the founder of Fukuoka Tamaya (ja:福岡玉屋), once one of the major department stores in Fukuoka, was located here.

The old house named Shofu-so (松風荘), originally the private residence of the Tanakamaru family. The site of the house went under a renewal and reopened in July 2007 as Shofu-en park. Shofu-an (松風庵), the tea room which was long used by Tanakamaru family is preserved in its original condition.

The Fukuoka Municipal Zoo and Botanical Garden is nearby.
