= Kilmokea =

Kilmokea (Irish: Cill Mhic Aodha) is a former Georgian rectory in County Wexford, Ireland. It is situated on a 6th-century monastic site on Great Island, a small peninsula within the Hook peninsula where the Barrow, Suir and Campile rivers meet, close to the Slieve Coillte, the highest point on the Hook peninsula, 15 kilometres (9.3 mi) from the town of New Ross. Since 1948 it has featured a 7-acre (2.8 ha) garden, which has been turned into a garden featuring a wide range of subtropical plants and organic vegetables. The site is in a civil parish of the same name.

== History ==
According to some sources Kilmokea, or Mileadoc was the spot at which Cessair, the granddaughter of Noah, escaping the flood, made the first incursion or invasion into Ireland in 2242 B.C.

In the 6th century an early ecclesiastical enclosure was established in the townland of Great Island when it was an actual island. In the 8th century a church was founded here by Suadbar, hence the reference in the name by a Kil (Irish: Cill), the Gaelic word for church. It was the church of Mac Aodh (Hugh or Mogue). A remnant of this church is a small High Cross, one of the smallest examples of a High Cross in Ireland. It is only 0.55 metres (1 ft 10 in) high and at the crux only 0.31 metres (1 ft 0 in) wide.

== Garden ==
The garden was opened to the public in 1998. Laid out in seven acres, the gardens are divided into formal, agricultural and parkland sections, including lakes, archaeological areas of interest and even an Italian pavilion.
