= Isui-en =

Meiji era garden in Nara, Japan

Coordinates: 34.685646°N 135.837674°E

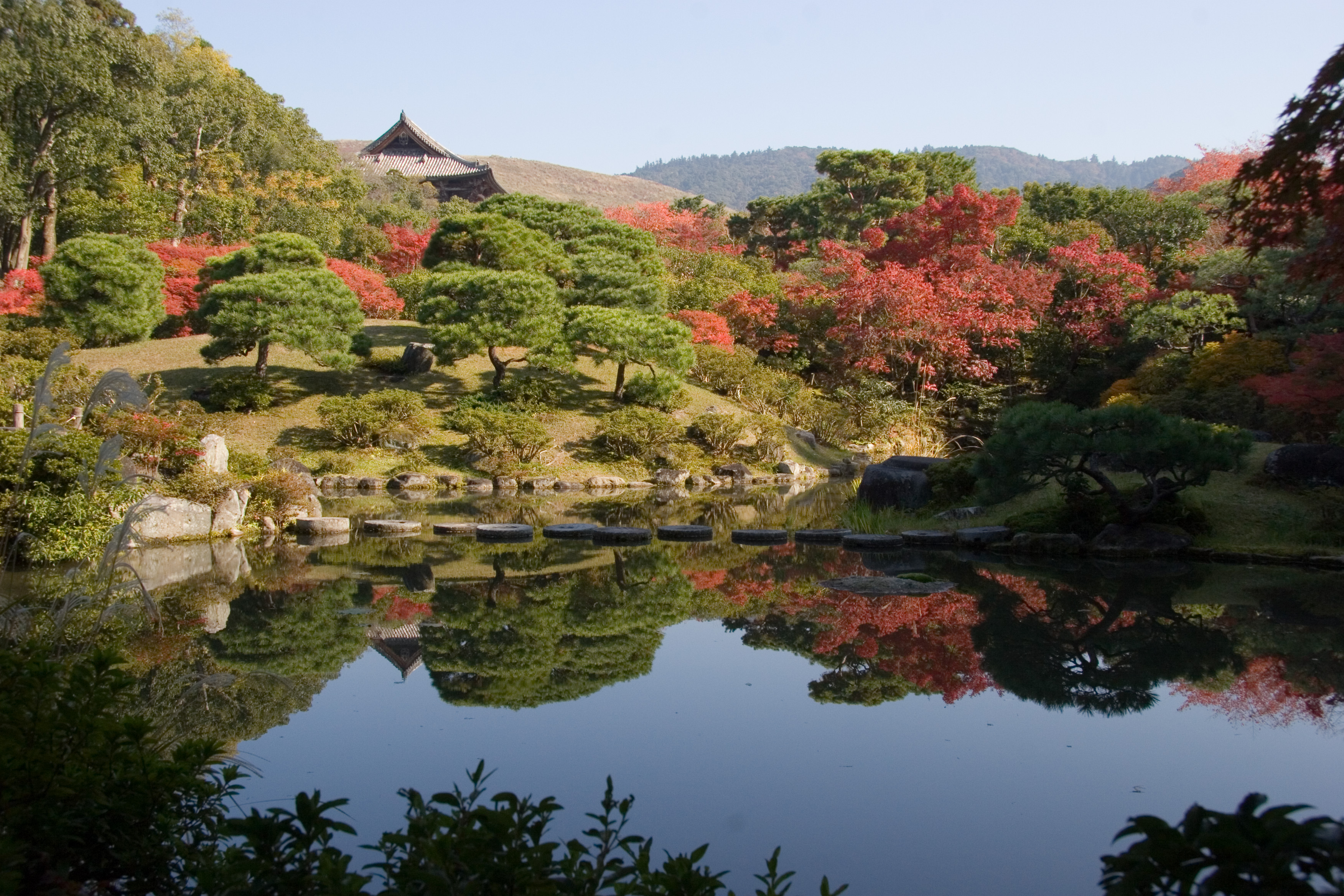
View of Isui-en Garden during early fall, towards the Nandaimon gate, and hills of Nara

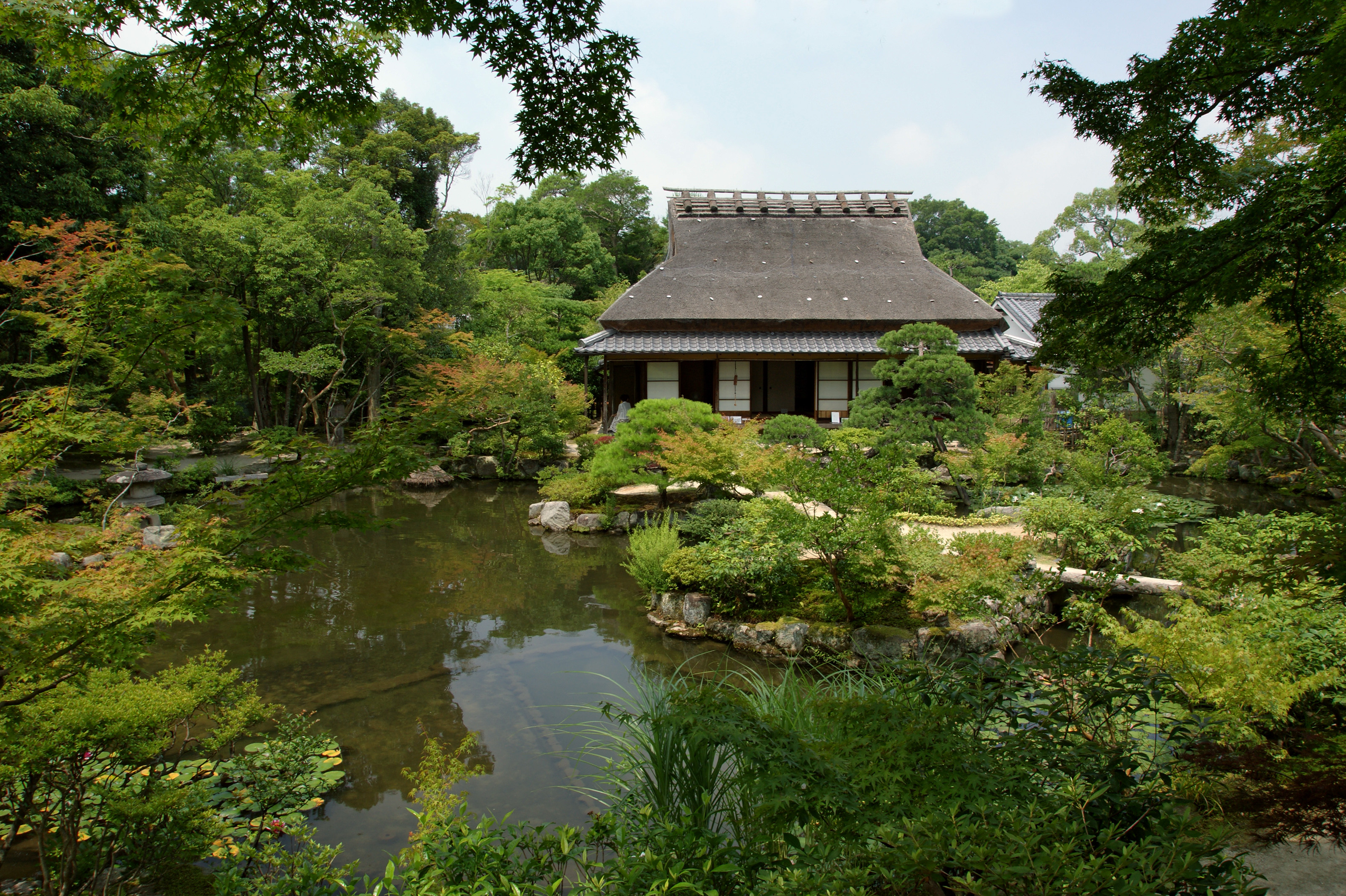
One of the tea houses

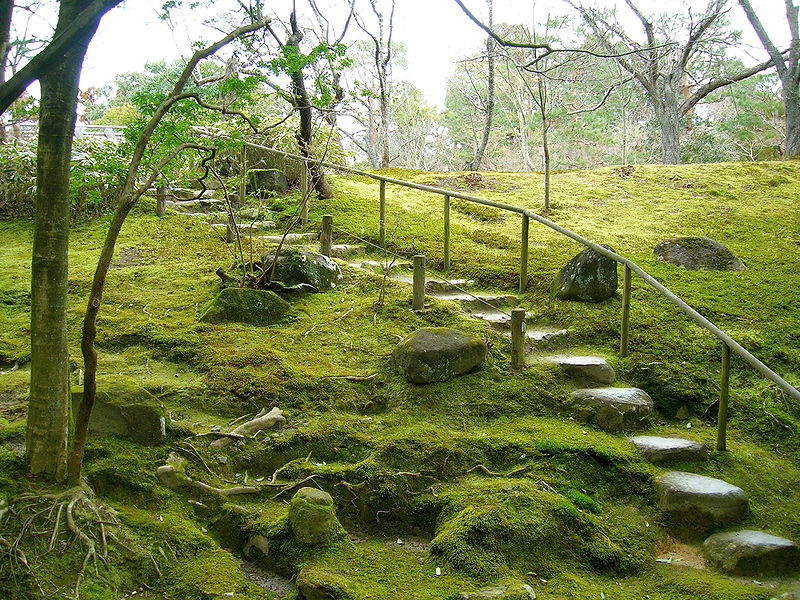
A path through the garden moss

Isui-en (依水園, Isuien) is a Japanese garden located in Nara, the old capital of Japan near Kyōto. It has been preserved since its creation in the Meiji era, and is the only walking garden (kaiyushiki teien) in Nara. It is divided into two sections, which were originally two separate gardens, and each features a pagoda.

== History ==
The site of the western garden originally formed part of Manishu-in, a minor temple which was part of the larger temple of Kofuku-ji. The ground was bought in the 1670, during the Enpō era by Kiyosumi Michikiyo, a wealthy tanner. He restructured the gardens between 1673 and 1681 and built two houses: the Sanshu-tei and Tei-shu-Ken, as the family home. These were built with thatched roofs. The name Sanshu-tei ("house of the three wonders") was given by Mokuan, the large priest of the Manpuku-ji temple of the school Zen Oubaku with Uji.

The larger eastern garden dates from 1899 and was designed by Seki Tojiro, a Nara businessman. Tojiro hired for the redesign Horitoku, a garden architect from the school of Urasenke.

In 1939, the two gardens were bought and combined by Jyunsaku Nakamura, a merchant of Nara, to provide a site for the attached Neiraku Museum (寧楽美術館), which hosts a collection of traditional Japanese ceramics.

== Layout ==
The gardens cover roughly 145,000 square feet (13,500 m^{2}).

In the central pond of the gardens, there are two islands with sculptures of a crane and tortoise. In Japanese culture these animals represent longevity.

The house of the Hyoshin-tei, along with the west pool, were designed by Kimura Seibei, another garden architect from Urasenke. It allows access of the house by using a technique called shakkei, or "borrowed landscape." The composition of the landscape incorporates the roof of the large southern door (Nandaimon) of the temple Tōdai-ji, as well as the three higher hills overhanging Nara: the mounts Wakakusa, Kasuga, and Mikasa. It is framed by the trees of the Himuro sanctuary in the south, and the Tōdai-ji temple in the north. These make the space between the garden and background seem to disappear, producing a continuity which makes the landscape blend in visual harmony. This harmony is reinforced by the absence of any artificial enclosure.

The shape of the pond represents the shape of the kanji 水 character for mizu (“water”). A central island is connected to the bank by a series of stepping stones, which were formerly used to grind the pigments used in dyeing. The garden also contains decorative stones, which were popular during the Meiji era. The water is fed by the Yosiki river, which flows adjacent to the garden.

== Bibliography ==
- Mansfield, Stephen (2011). Japan's Master Gardens - Lessons in Space and Environment (Hardback). Tokyo, Rutland, Singapore: Tuttle. ISBN 978-4-8053-1128-8.
