= Mount Usher Gardens =

Gardens in Ashford, County Wicklow, Ireland

Coordinates: 53.008°N 6.105°W

Mount Usher Gardens (Irish: Gairdíní Mount Usher) located at Ashford, County Wicklow, Ireland, was laid out in 1868. It is spread on twenty acres of land along River Vartry, having more than 5000 plant species.

== History ==
The land now part of the garden was anciently part of a lake./>

A new house was built on the site in 1927-28 for E.H. Walpole.
