= Oskarshamns Stadspark =

Park in Oskarshamn, Sweden

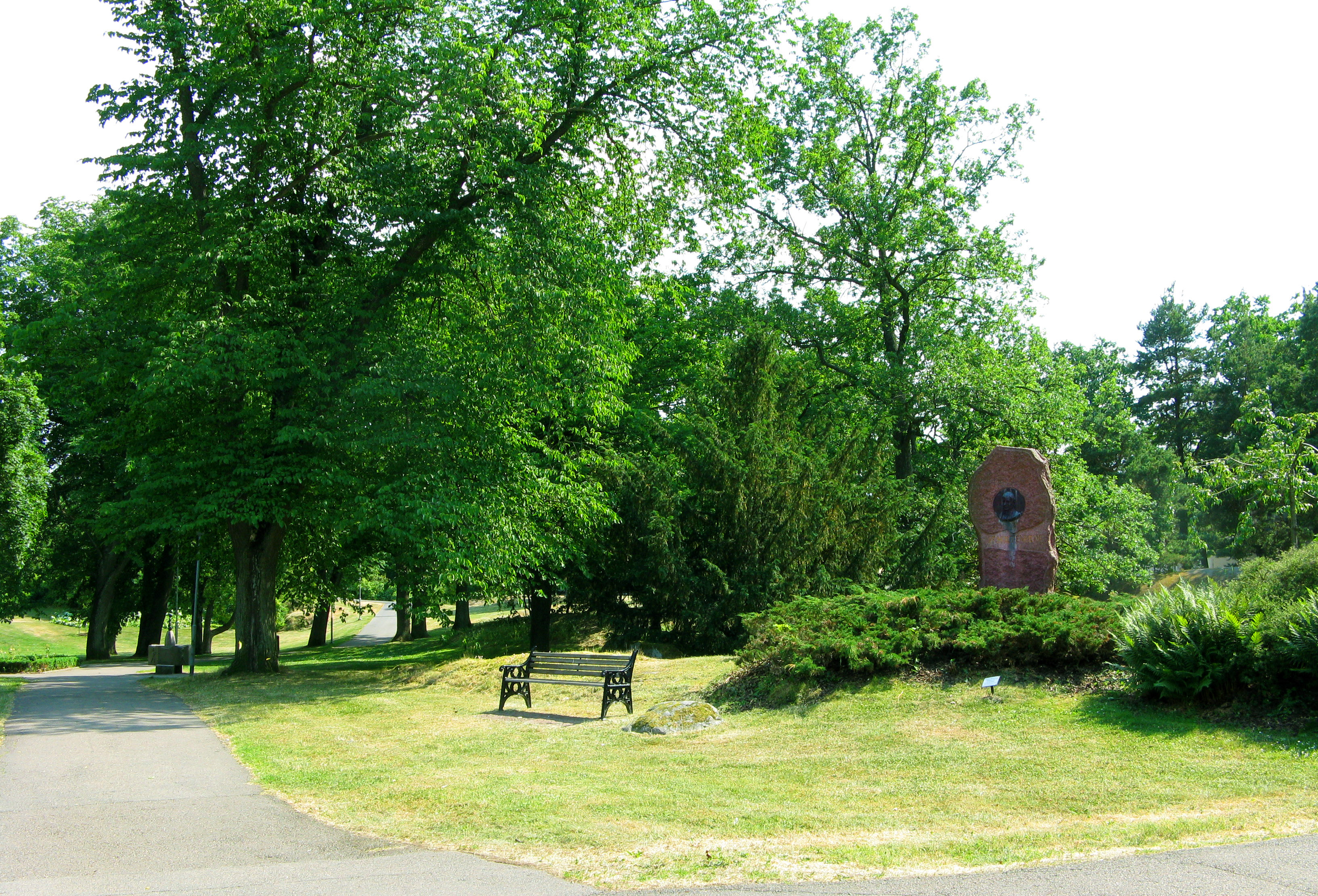
- Section of the park with memorial of J.F. Hultenheim.
- Interactive map of Oskarshamns Stadspark
- Type: Urban park
- Location: Oskarshamn, Sweden
- Coordinates: 57°15′42″N 16°27′10″E
- Created: 19th century
- Operator: Oskarshamn Municipality
- Open: Open all year

Oskarshamns Stadspark (literally Oskarshamn City Park) is a public park in Oskarshamn, in the south-east of Sweden. The park has an urban location just south of the city center.

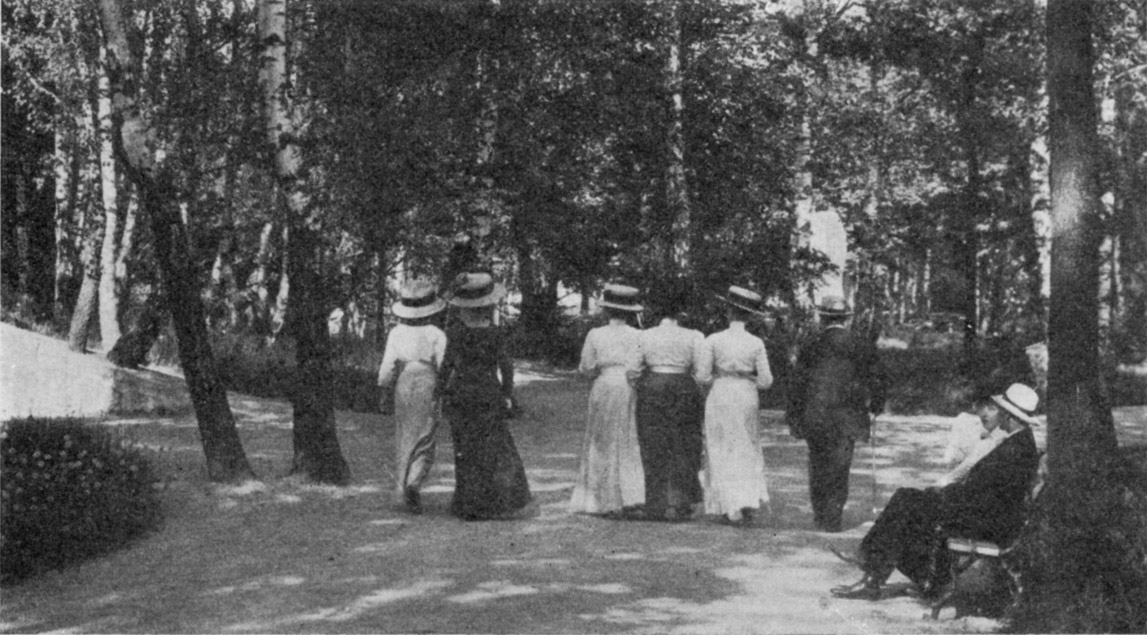
The park in the late 19th century

== History ==
The plans for an urban park took shape shortly after Oskarshamn got its town charter in 1856. The city council bought the land necessary in 1863–1864. It was bought from the private land owner Johan Fredrik Hultenheim. Today a stone memorial of J.F. Hultenheim can be found in the northern part of the park.

== Description ==
The park was originally formed on three bogareas surrounded by smooth rocks of granite. From the elevated areas in the eastern park there are views over the port and the surrounding waters outside Oskarshamn.

The northern part of the park mainly consists of open lawns surrounded by broadleaf trees, bushes and different types of flowers. In the middle of the park there is a public tennis court. The southern part of the park is dominated by pine trees and sparse populations of birch. Throughout the park there are smaller fountains and ponds. There are also a handful of bronze statues. A grid of trails makes the park accessible for walking, jogging and bicycling.

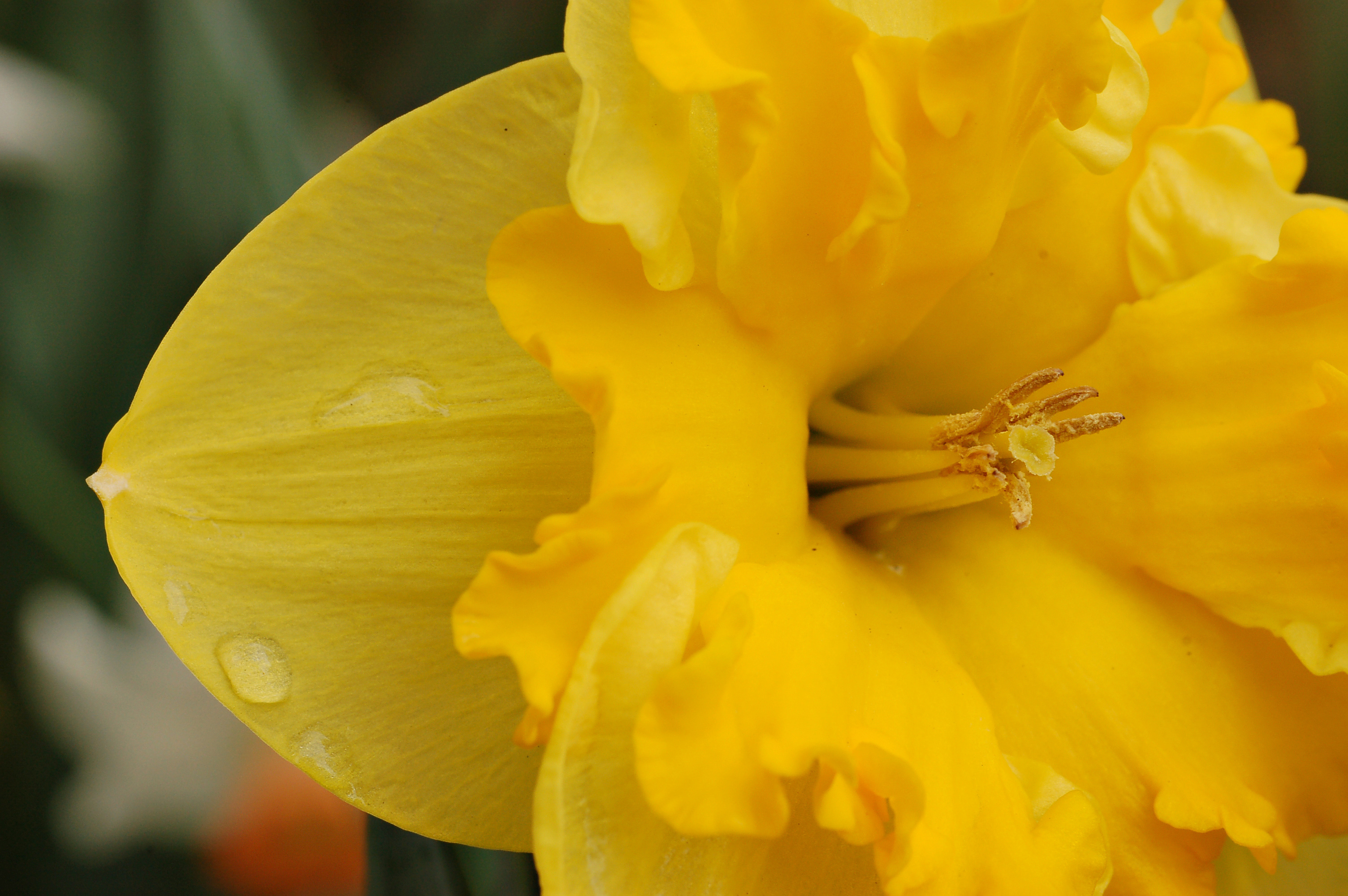
Narcissus

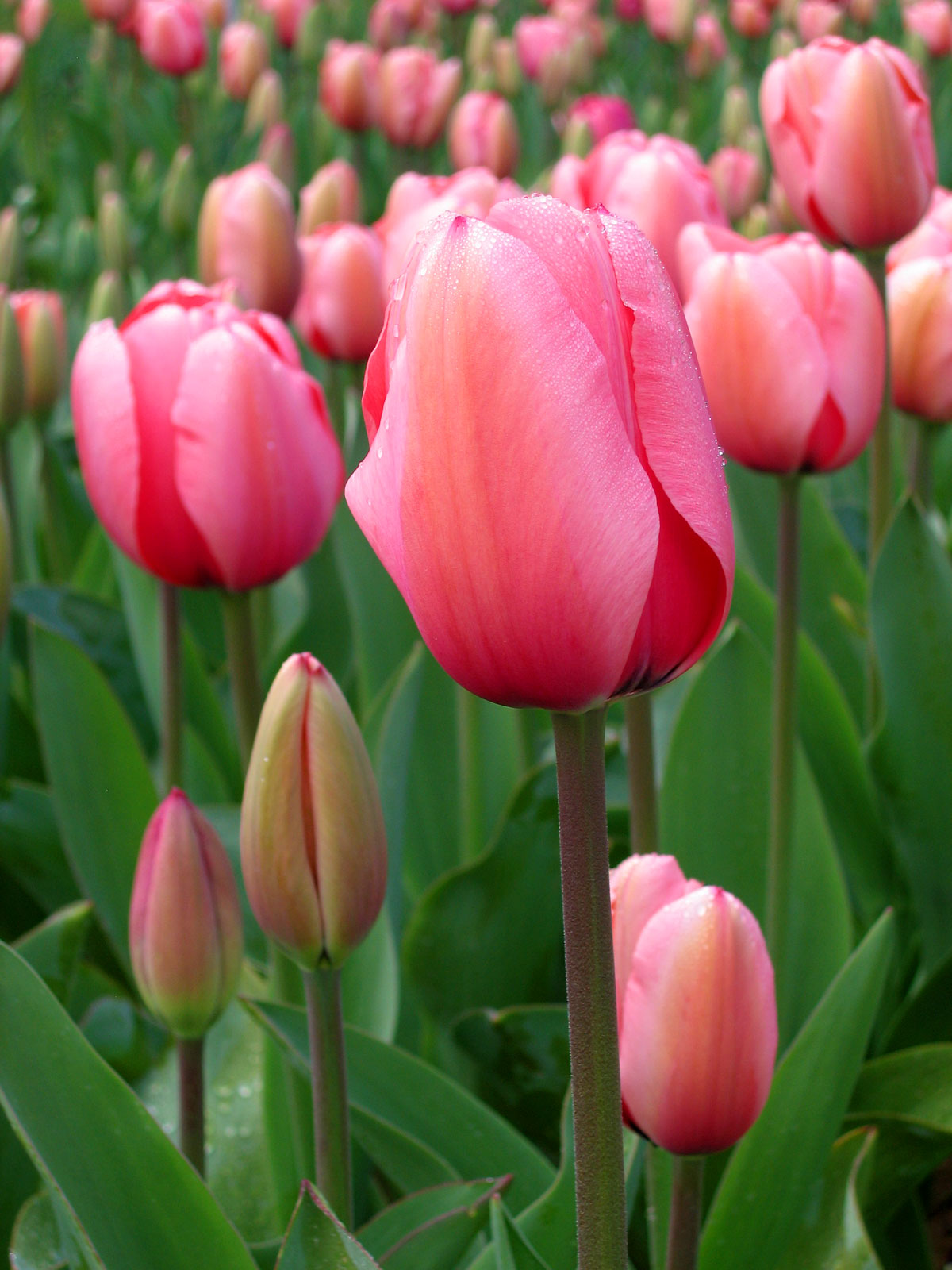
Tulips

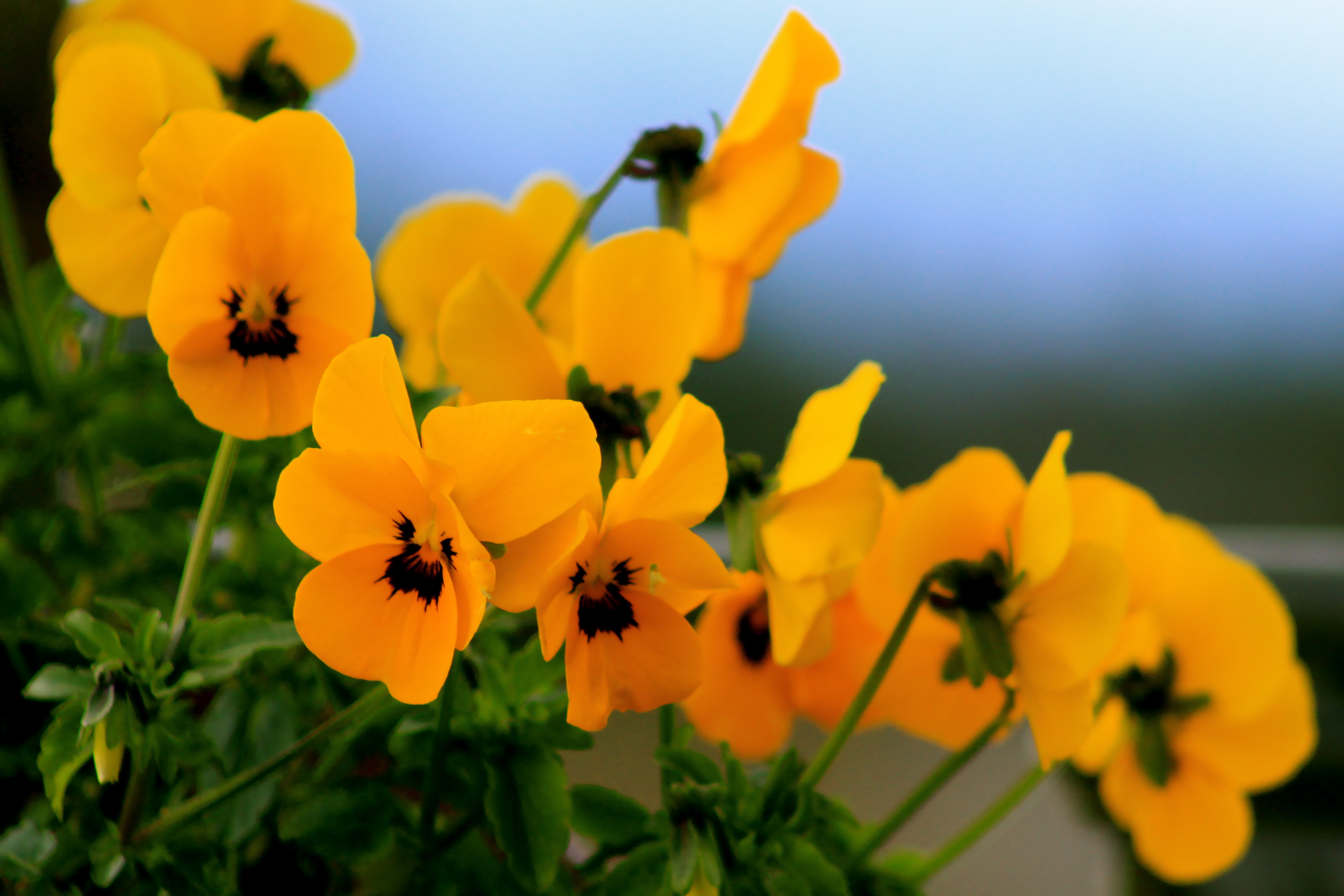
Pansies

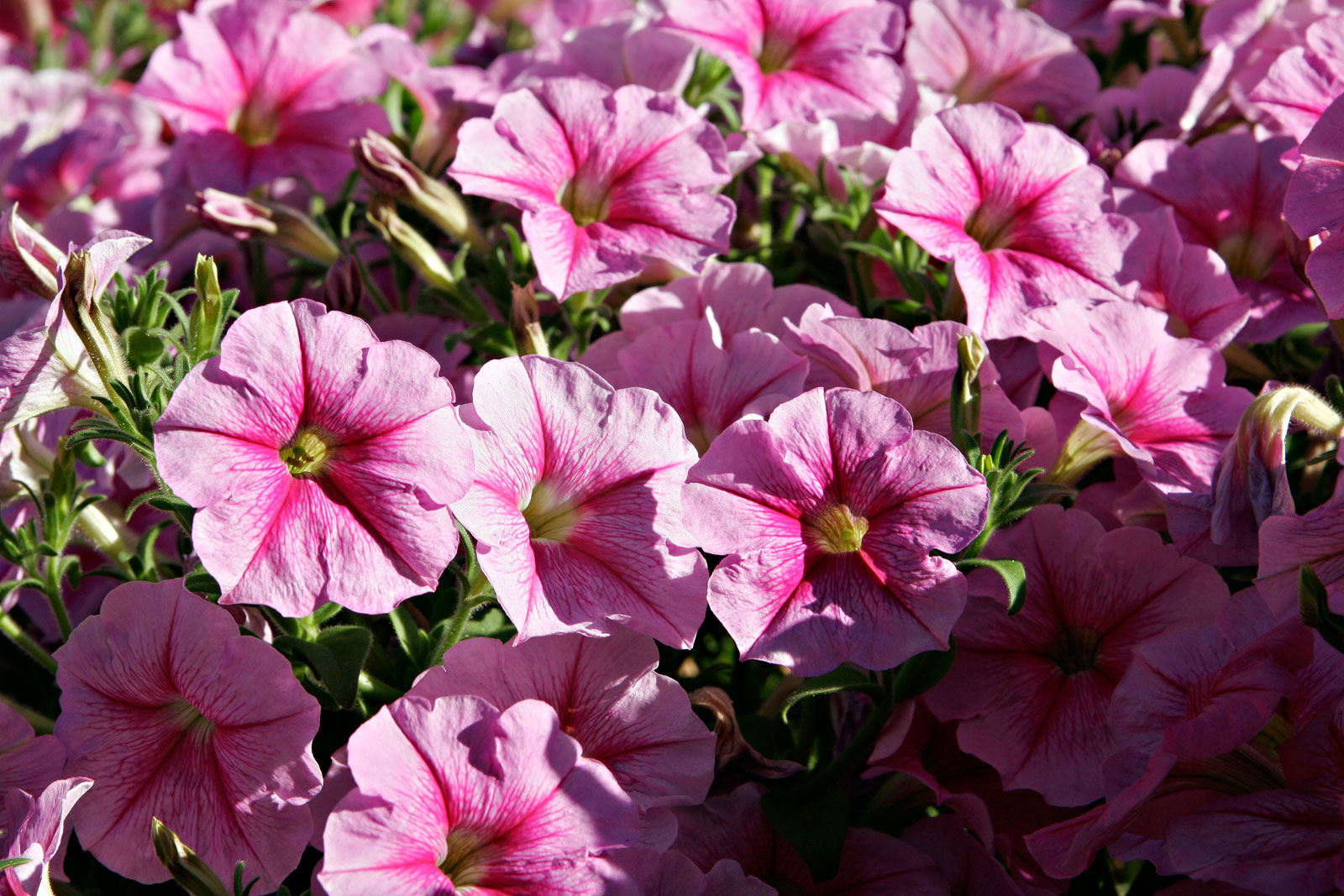
Petunias

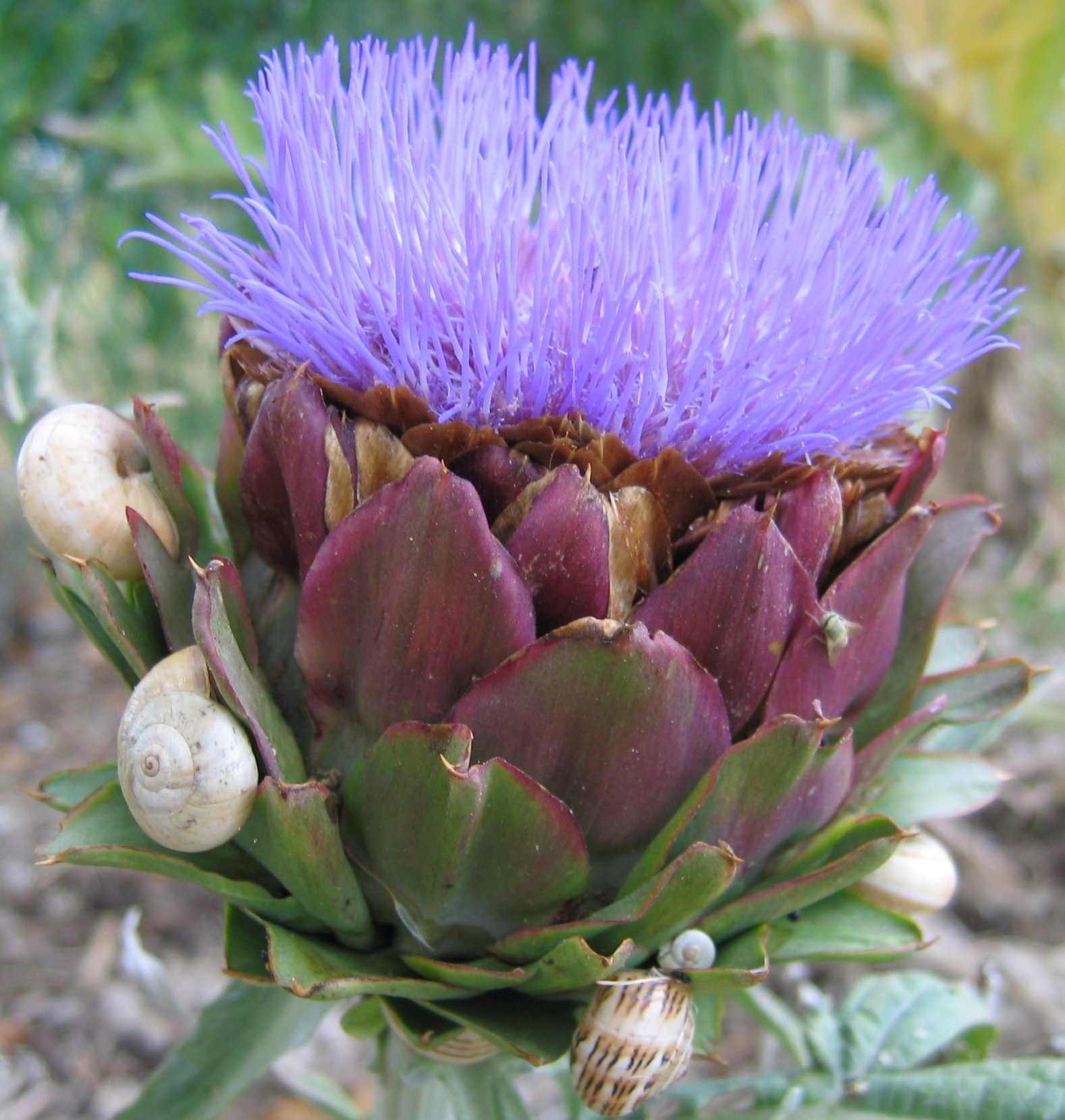
Artichoke

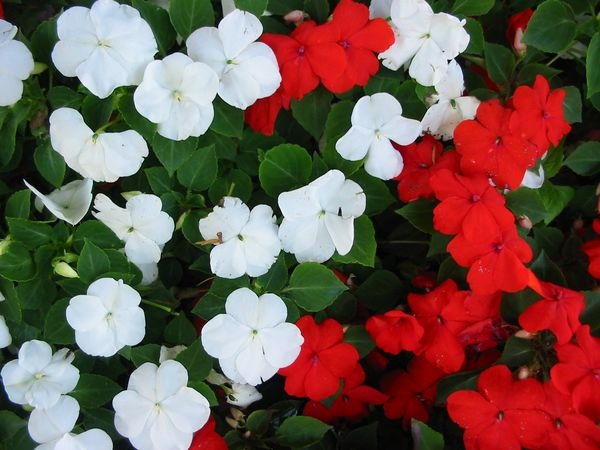
Busy Lizzy

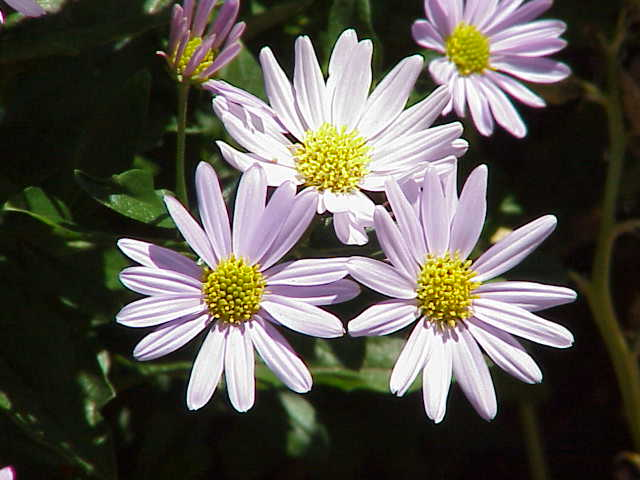
Aster

Some of the species of the park's flower bedding
