= Garden of Santa Barbara (Braga) =

Garden of Santa Bárbara
- Garden of Santa Barbara and eastern wing of the Archiepiscopal Court
- Interactive map of Garden of Santa Bárbara
- Location: Braga, Braga, Cávado, Norte, Portugal
- Coordinates: 41°33′5.02″N 8°25′33.12″W
- Elevation: 187 m (614 ft)
- Named for: Saint Barbara
- Operator: Instituto Gestão do Patrimonio Arquitectónico e Arqueológico

The Garden of Santa Barbara (Portuguese: Jardim de Santa Bárbara) is a municipal garden in the civil parish of Sé, municipality of Braga, alongside the eastern wing of the historical Archbishop's Palace of Braga.

== History ==
The Garden was actually a modern elaboration of the space: in 1955, the garden was landscaped, in keeping with the Estado Novo romanticism of the period. From plaques located on the site, the design and landscaping was completed by José Cardoso da Silva (from a posthumous inscription dedicated by the municipal government of Braga).

== Geography ==
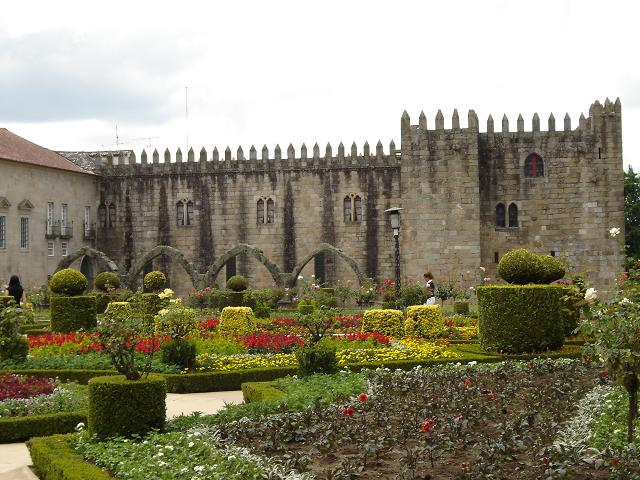
Another perspective of the Garden, from the northeast corner of the grounds

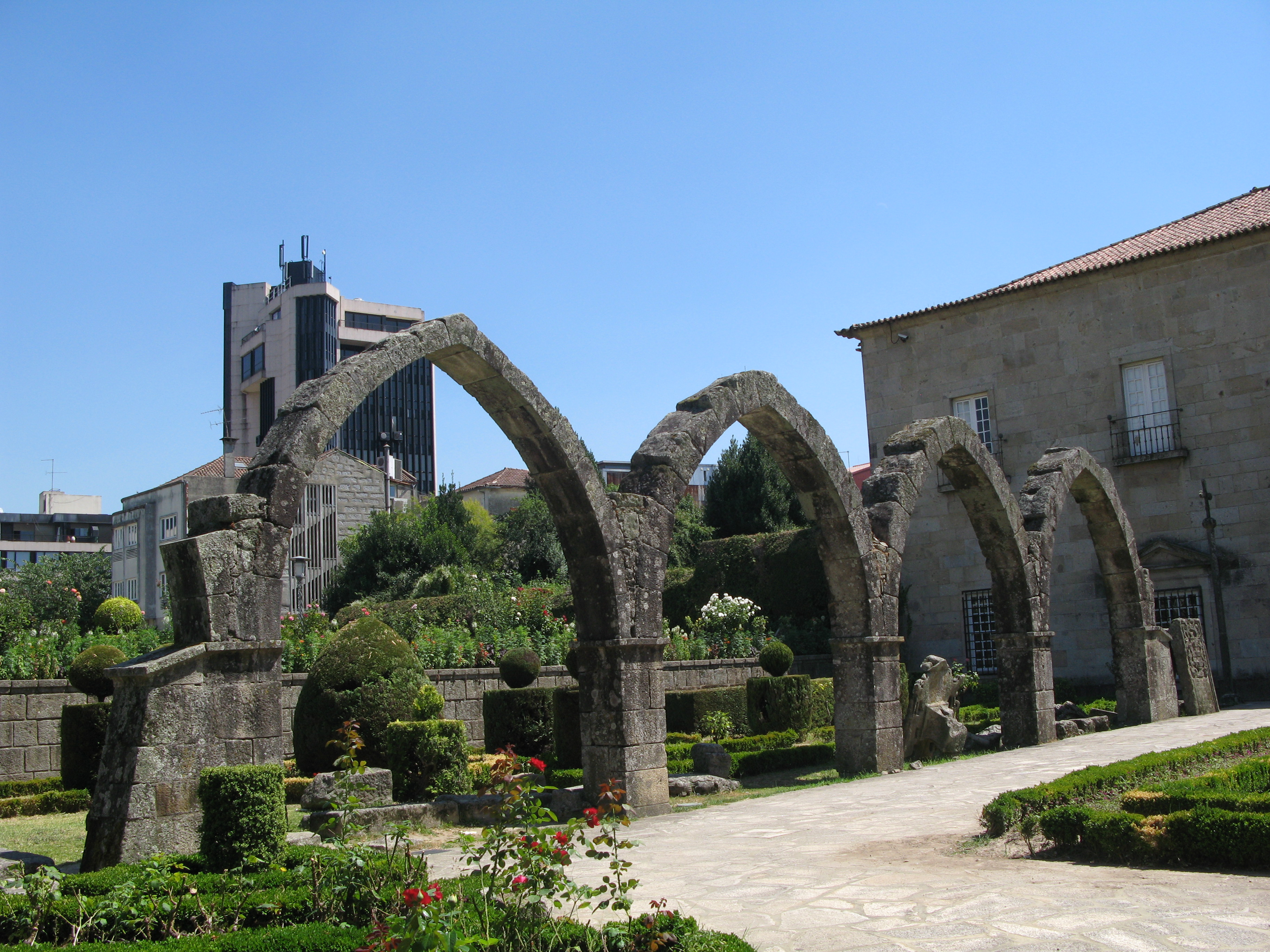
The remains of the medieval arcade of the palace forming the southwest corner of the garden

The garden is located in the northeast corner of the Archbishop's Palace, on an elevation. It consists of geometric designs carved from beds of boxwood, decorated with cedar topiaries.

The northern patio of the Palace, alongside the Garden, is manicured with diverse architectural elements; specifically, the remains of cornices, statues and coat-of-arms in rock. Delimiting this space, are the broken ruins of an arcade, that pertained to the medieval palace. Located in the middle of the garden is a statue of Saint Barbara on a fountain, which represents the patron saint of the garden, and namesake.
