= Parco Virgiliano =

Park in Naples, Italy

Coordinates: 40°47′59″N 14°10′51″E

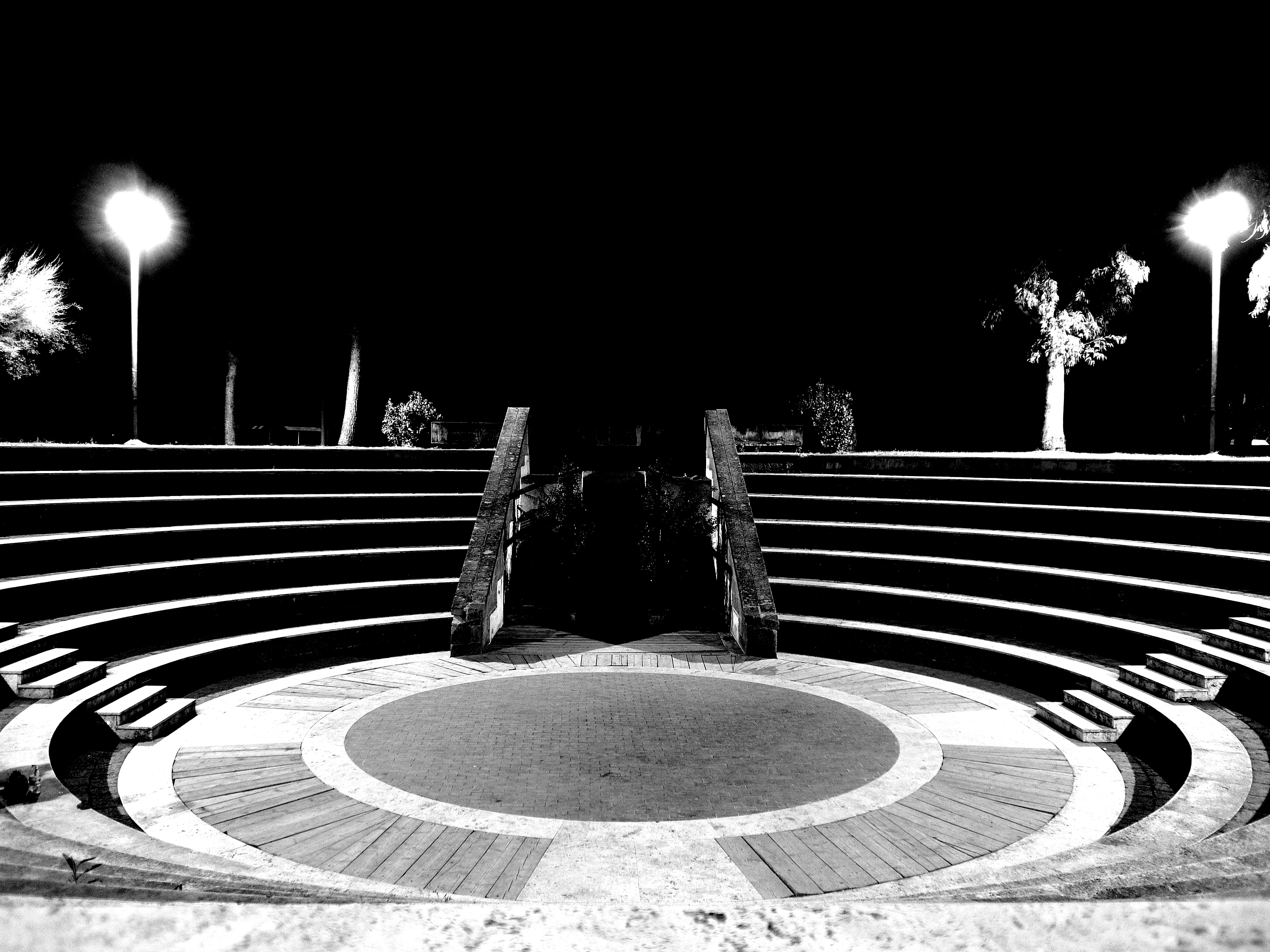
Amphitheatre in the park.

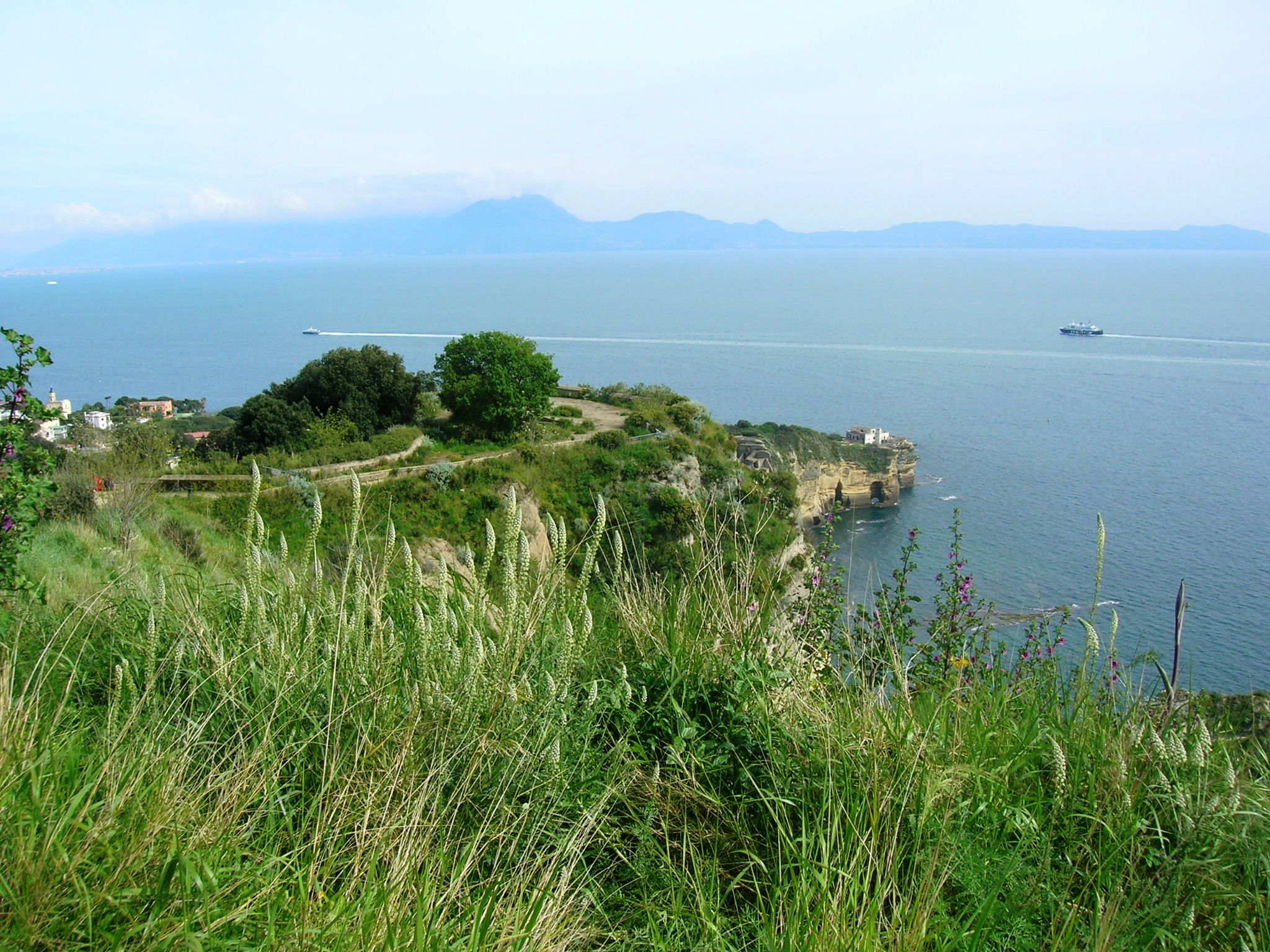
the park

Parco Virgiliano (the Park of Remembrance) is a scenic park located on the hill of Posillipo, Naples, Italy.

The Park serves as a green space, built on the tufa stone typical to the coast of Posillipo.

A series of terraces overlooking the Gulf of Naples provides the park with an array of vistas, including views of the coasts of Amalfi and Sorrento, Mount Vesuvius, Gaiola Bay, Pollione'S amphitheater, Trentaremi Bay, Nisida island, the factory neighbourhood of Bagnoli, Pozzuoli, Baia, Bacoli, Monte di Procida and the islands of Ischia, Capri and Procida.

The park offers several playgrounds designed for children of various age-groups, as well as many kiosks.

The park also has a small amphitheater, where events are organized in the summers.
