= Vauxhall (Gothenburg) =

Plleasure garden in Gothenburg, Sweden

Vauxhall or Vauxhallen was a pleasure garden in Gothenburg in Sweden, active from 1773 until 1802. It was situated at Första Långgatan nr 10 in the Masthugget area in Gothenburg. The area contained a building for public balls and concerts as well as a park, and was used for balls, concerts, fire works, military parades and all sorts of artists performances against an entrance fee.

== History ==
Initially, a tavern was managed on the spot by Carsten Vogdt or Voegt (d. 1678), which was made into a country villa by the wealthy Amija merchant family in 1686, as it was then a bit outside of town.

In 1745, the house was bought by Johan Bartram Kitz (1712-1759), who established a restaurant in the garden, known as Kitziska trädgården (Kitzian Gardens), which also included tobacco gardens and fishponds.

The Vauxhall was founded when the Kitzian Gardens were bought by Peter Lamberg, who wished to found an establishment of the same kind as the Vauxhall Gardens in London, which were famous at the time and had inspired similar establishments in many European capitals: the capital of Stockholm had its own Vauxhall in Kungsträdgården in 1772. At the time, Gothenburg was a big and important city dominated by a very wealthy merchant class, but with few public pleasure establishments outside of the concerts given in the city hall and the cathedral from 1756 onward, and the occasional travelling theater companies and other artists passing temporarily through town.

The Vauxhall of Gothenburg was inaugurated 15 August 1773 with a concert in the gardens for a fee of 1 daler silver. The establishment was a part of a greater demand of entertainment in Gothenburg: in 1774, regular public balls was arranged in the city hall, and in 1779, the first permanent theater, Comediehuset, was founded. Vauxhall was reserved for the upper classes: people of the low status classes, such as servants, were not admitted to the gardens even if they could pay the fee.

The Vauxhall arranged masquerades, fireworks, and performances by actors, athletes, circus artists and all sorts of artists passing through town. It was frequented by the rich burgher class and particularly popular among the officers of Gothenburg. The clients took walks in the park, had dinner, listened to a concert, often with a singer as well, watched a performance of some kind, and danced. The house of the park could also be hired for private celebrations by both private citizens as well as societies, often to celebrate royal events. Vauxhall was opened every day of the week, but Sundays was a special "Vauxhall-day" when something special was generally arranged in the park, often fireworks.

On 24 September 1774 as well as in 1779, the future Charles XIII of Sweden and Hedwig Elizabeth Charlotte of Holstein-Gottorp visited Gothenburg and were celebrated by the burghers of Gothenburg in Vauxhall, and on 12 July 1786, king Gustav III of Sweden and the crown prince were celebrated with a grand party in the Vauxhall arranged by the burghers of the town.

In 1802, the Vauxhall was no longer fashionable and the selling of tickets was discontinued. In the 1820s, the park was destroyed and divided into residential areas, and in 1906, the Vauxhall building was torn down.
