= Longhua Pagoda =

Building in China

Coordinates: 31°10′32″N 121°26′50″E

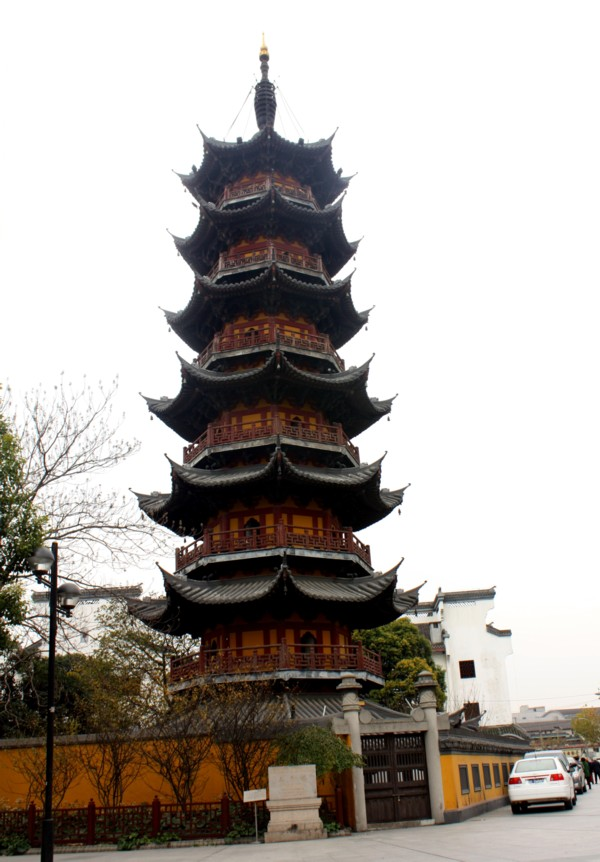
Longhua Pagoda in Xuhui, Shanghai, China

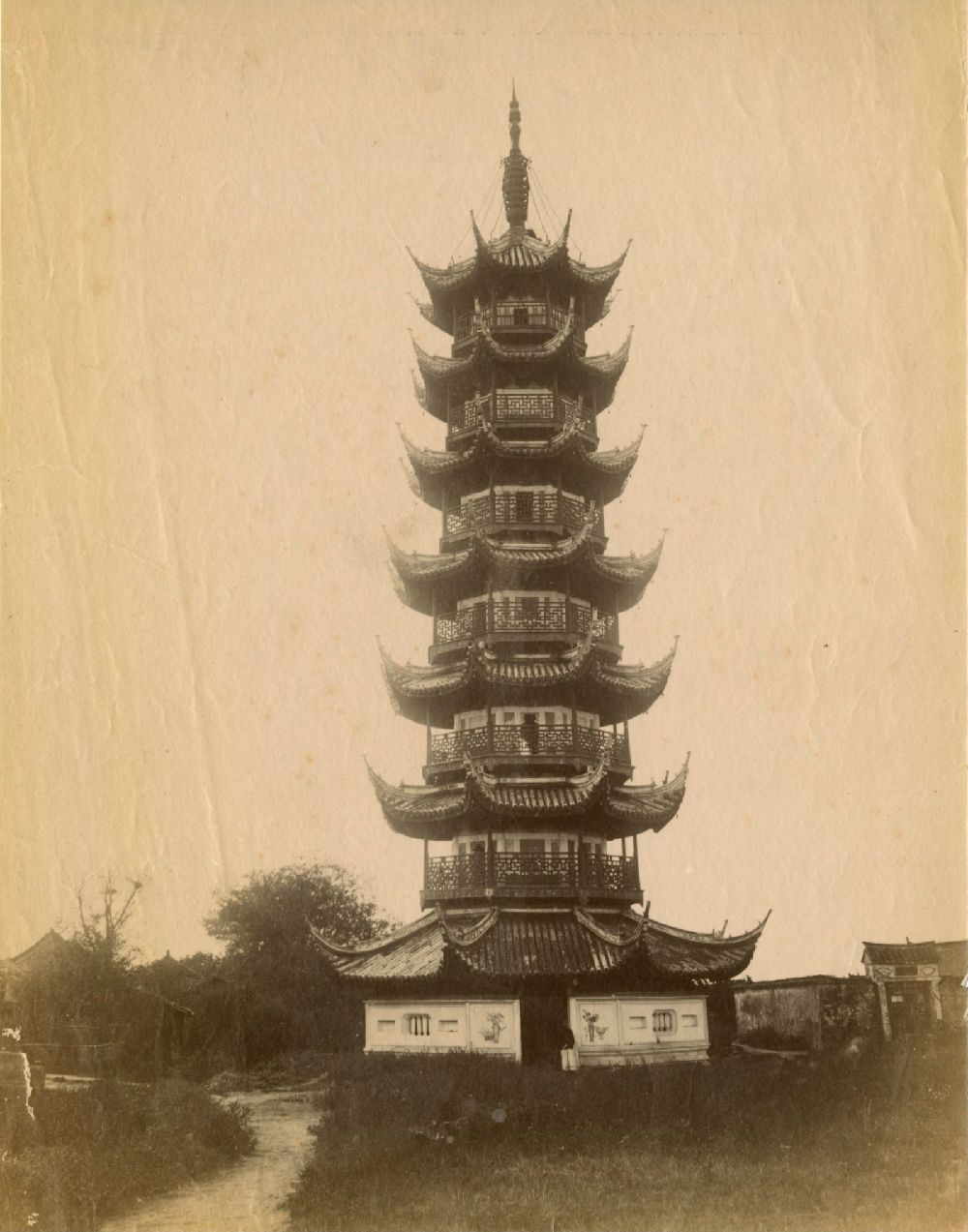
Photographer unknown, "Longhua Pagoda, Shanghai," n.d., Department of Image Collections, National Gallery of Art Library, Washington, DC

Longhua Pagoda (龙华塔) is an octagonal wood and brick pagoda located in Xuhui District, Shanghai, East China. It is thought to have been first built during the Three Kingdoms period (East Wu), but the existing tower structure was built during the Northern Song dynasty. The pagoda underwent several renovations over various dynastic periods, which resulted in the addition of several architectural features that were not in the typical style of the Song dynasty. After the establishment of the People's Republic of China, these later additions were removed and rebuilt in the Song dynasty style. Because of this, the pagoda has now been largely restored to its original appearance. The pagoda was twice established as a Shanghai Cultural Site Under State Protection, once on 26 May 1959 and again on 7 December 1997. On 25 May 2006, it was declared by the State Council to be among the sixth group of Major Historical and Cultural Sites Protected at the National Level.

== History ==
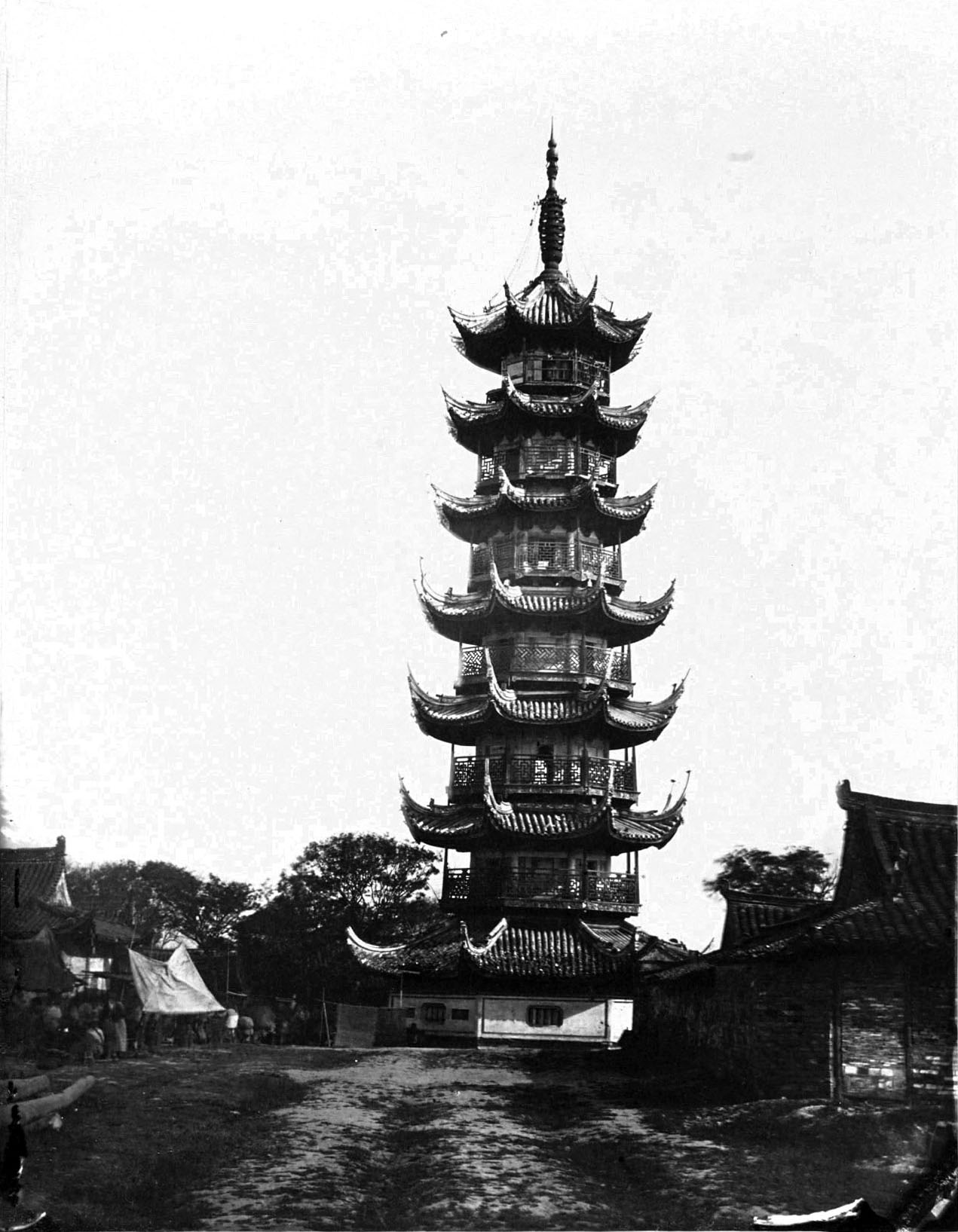
Longhua Pagoda (1875 or 1876)

Longhua Pagoda, traditionally referred to as “Writing Brush Peak” (Chinese: 文筆峯; pinyin: wénbǐfēng), is thought to have originally been constructed along with Longhua Temple in the state of Wu's Chiwu era (Chiwu is a regnal year of Sunquan) during the Three Kingdoms period (242–247). Its main function was housing precious Sharira relics. The pagoda was restored under an imperial edict during the Chuigong era (678) of the Tang dynasty (Note: Longhua Temple is said to have been constructed in 687 during the Chuigong era and the pagoda is said to have been built during the Three Kingdoms period.), but it was burnt down again during the Huang Chao peasant uprising in the first year of the Guangming era (880). The main structure of the existing pagoda was constructed under the direction of King Qian Chu of Wuyue in the Taiping Xingguo era (977) of the Northern Song dynasty. The pagoda was located in Longhua Temple when it was first built, and underwent renovation in the Taiping era (1066) of the Northern Song dynasty, and in the Shaoxing era (1147) of the Southern Song dynasty. Longhua Temple was destroyed during the war towards the end of the Yuan dynasty, but the pagoda was unharmed. It was renovated during the Wanli (1591) and Chongzhen (1630) eras of the Ming dynasty, and the Kangxi (1668) and Daoguang (1827) eras of the Qing dynasty, respectively. In the Guangxu era (1891), Longhua Road was constructed. This road passed through the former site of the temple, with the temple situated on its north side and the pagoda on its south side. A new courtyard was then built around the pagoda. In 1892, during the Guangxu era, a fire broke out that destroyed the pagoda's ground floor peridrome. One artistically talented monk of Longhua Temple sold his own paintings in order to raise funds for the ancient pagoda's restoration.

In 1920, military troops were stationed at Longhua Temple, which caused the majority of its monks to be displaced. During this period, Zhang Muhan, the troop's regimental commander, and Yuan Zhao, a monk of Longhua Temple, raised funds for Longhua Pagoda's restoration. In the process of the pagoda's renovation, its original wooden railings were removed and replaced with cement and steel banisters. More barriers were also added to the peridromes. According to the folk legend believed by Zhang Muhan, the pagoda was built by Sun Quan in order to express gratitude for his mother's nurturing of him. For this reason, a plaque inscribed with “Pagoda of Gratitude” was hung above the pagoda's entrance. In 1926, Longhua Pagoda was struck by lightning, which destroyed the guardrails on its third and fourth stories. The fifth, sixth and seventh stories of the pagoda, along with its base, were split by a lightning strike. During the Second Sino-Japanese War, the pagoda sustained further damage. In 1945, figures such as Huang Jinrong and Zhang Fanggeng raised funds for the pagoda to be repaired.

After the People's Republic of China was established, Longhua Pagoda underwent repair and renovation from 1954 until 1955. This resulted in it being largely restored to its original Song dynasty form. On 26 May 1959, Longhua Pagoda was declared a Shanghai Cultural Site Under State Protection. In 1962, the pagoda was refurbished. In the early morning of 6 September 1962, a tornado descended on Longhua from the north west, but the pagoda was unharmed. On 25 August 1966, a Red Guard tied the pagoda to a tractor in an attempt to tear it down. When this failed, they attempted to set fire to the pagoda using gasoline. After being blocked by local residents, the Red Guard ultimately ceased the attempt. On the afternoon of 27 August, a note was attached to the pagoda stating that it would be demolished in the “Destroy the Four Olds” campaign. The Longhua District Party Committee and the Township People's Congress put people in place and took preventative measures. The next day, local people hung large banners bearing Cultural Revolution political slogans from the south, north and west sides of the pagoda. This prevented it from being destroyed in the Cultural Revolution. On 7 December 1977, Longhua Pagoda was, for the second time, declared a Shanghai Cultural Site Under State Protection. Between 1984 and 1985, Longhua Pagoda's finial was replaced due to severe corrosion of the tower's wooden core. In 1986, the pagoda's scope of protection and span of control were determined. The scope of protection was within 50 meters of the pagoda. The span of control was 50–100 meters from the south and east sides, and 50–150 meters from the north side. At the beginning of 1990, the finial on top of the pagoda was once again refurbished. Lighting equipment was also installed on the tower at this time. In 1999, the lighting equipment was upgraded and the structure was repainted. In 1999, the incline of the pagoda increased to 104 cm. On 25 May 2006, the State Council announced that Longhua Pagoda was now a Major Historical and Cultural Site Protected at the National Level.

== Structure ==
Longhua Pagoda is composed of wood and brick, and is built in the style of a pavilion. The pagoda consists of seven octagonal levels totaling a height of 40.64 meters. (Note: The pagoda tower itself is 32.2 meters high. The total measurement of 40.64 meters includes the height of its roof, metal support rods and stupa. The height of the pagoda including its base is 41.04 meters.) Its core is hollow and tube-like, and its outer form is octagonal. The interior of the first story is octagonal, and the interiors of the other stories are square. The stories decrease in size from the bottom to the top. Each story contains four doorways and four rectangular shrines, but the shrines do not contain statues of Buddhas. The positions of these doorways and shrines rotate by 45° on each story. The floors of each story constitute the wooden structure. There are also wooden stairs which provide access to the seventh story. Under each floor there is a hidden brick post, and an entasis at the top of each post which splits into three sections. The corner bracket sets on the outer eaves are built in the “yuangyuang jiaoshou” style, which is typical of the Song dynasty. On the sixth story is the pagoda's 18-meter-long central pillar, which connects directly to the finial. The ground floor peridrome stoa's column head is spindle-shaped. There are fifteen decorative features on the square column, seven of which are wooden and eight of which are white. The bottom of the square column is in the shape of a zither's surface. The railings on each level are in the shape of swastikas, and small bells are hung on the upturned corners of the outer eaves.

The top story of the pagoda hosts the finial, which consists of features such as a stupa, a dew basin, seven disks and a bumpa; it is 8 meters tall. The axial pole is held down by four metal ropes. The foundations of the pagoda are below ground level, and consist of joists that are fused together with stones and cement. There is a 13 cm layer of wood filler on top of these joists, which is then topped with five layers of serrated water chestnut style bricks. These bricks are 35.5 cm long, 16 cm wide, and 7.5 cm thick. Above this there is a 170 cm thick fifteen-layer brick foundation. Each side is 70 cm longer than the width of the tower. The foundation is built in this manner in order to maximize the pagoda's stability during earthquakes. When a survey was carried out on the pagoda, its underground section could not be examined due to structural concerns. The conditions on the lower levels are therefore unknown.

== Protection ==
Following an inspection by the Shanghai Public Works Department in 1953, it emerged that Longhua Pagoda was leaning to the north, and that its flat cement base was cracked. Its wooden structure was also rotting and its joists were slipping. After discussing the matter with related departments, the Shanghai Department of Cultural Affairs formulated a rush repair plan and began the pagoda's refurbishment in accordance with its original Song dynasty design. Dinghui Temple's Shuang Pagoda in Suzhou was consulted as a reference throughout the renovation process. The restoration began on 20 October 1954 and was completed in April 1955. During construction, additions from the Ming and Qing dynasties and the Republican period that were not included in the pagoda's original design were removed. These included the stone stairs added in the Ming dynasty and the cement railings added in the Republican period. Ant damage to the pagoda was also dealt with, and a lightning rod was added. In 1984, the local Cultural Department found that Longhua Pagoda's finial was severely damaged, and that its wooden interior was rotting and had been eroded by termites. The Shanghai Administrative Committee of Cultural Affairs therefore allocated 300,000 yuan to Longhua Temple for repairs. The pagoda's 18-meter-high wooden core was replaced, as was the finial, which weighed 3.2 tons due to its 18 metal components. The sixth and seventh stories were demolished and rebuilt. The renovations were completed in September 1985. In 2010, the Xuhui District People's Government implemented a building height limit around Longhua Pagoda. In addition to protecting the pagoda, this also preserved the local area's so-called “Evening Pagoda Scene”.

After the establishment of the PRC, Longhua Pagoda was closed to the public due to preservation concerns. On 21–22 September and 1–3 October 2006, the pagoda was opened up to visitors for a limited time. 10 people were permitted entry at once and could stay for approximately 20 minutes. The first to the fifth stories were now accessible. In the interest of the wooden stairs’ preservation, guests wearing high-heeled shoes were not permitted entry.
