= Longhua Temple =

Buddhist temple in Shanghai, China

- 龍華寺
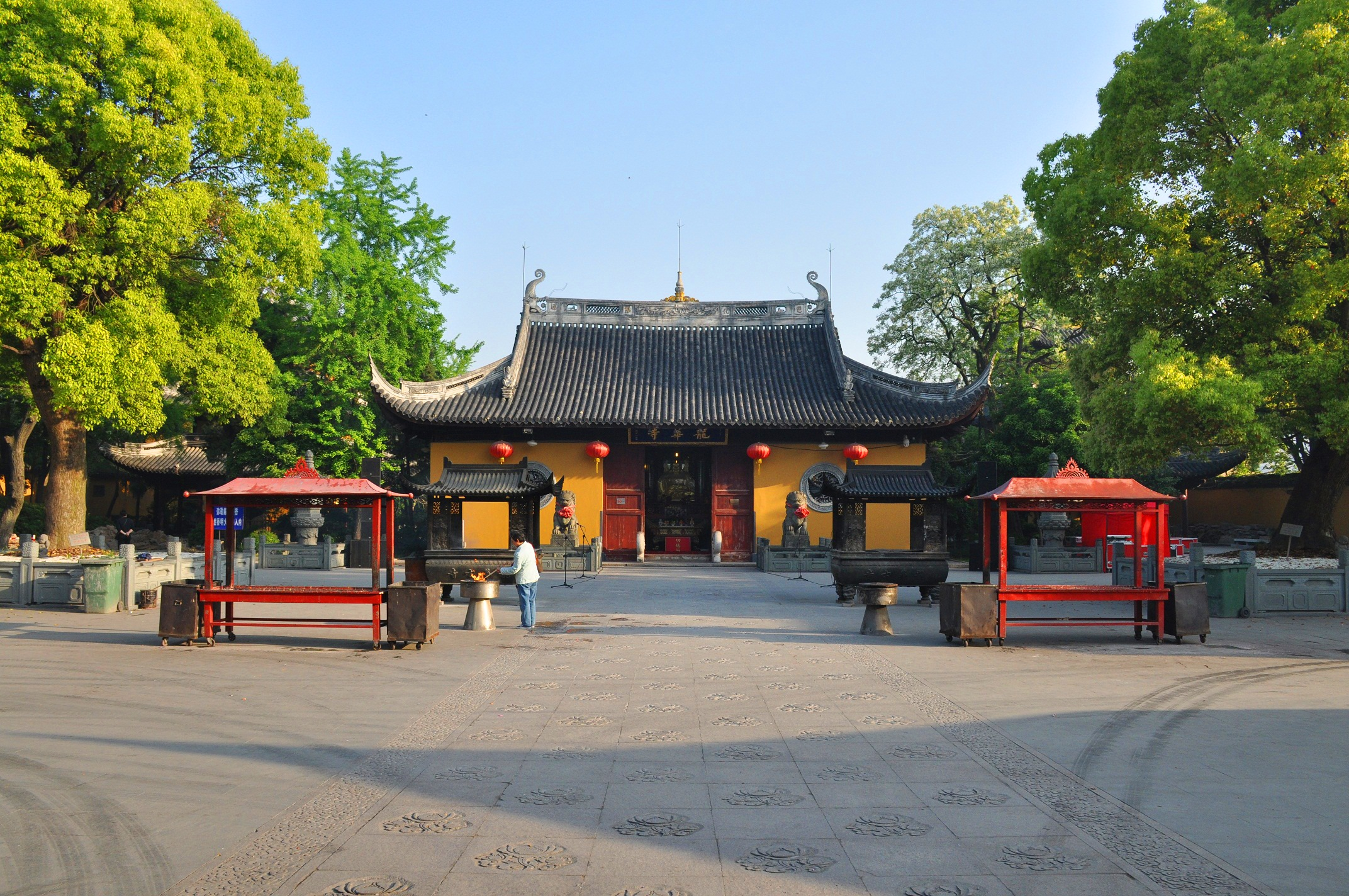
- Longhua Temple

- Location in Shanghai

Religion
- Affiliation: Buddhism
- Sect: Chan Buddhism

Location
- Location: Xuhui District, Shanghai
- Country: China
- Coordinates: 31.172658°N 121.451261°E

Architecture
- Style: Chinese architecture
- Completed: 242

The Longhua Temple (simplified Chinese: 龙华寺; traditional Chinese: 龍華寺; pinyin: Lónghuá Sì; Shanghainese: Lon-ngu-zy; alternatively Lunghwa Temple; literally "Dragon Flower Temple") is a Buddhist temple dedicated to the Maitreya Buddha in Shanghai. Although most of the present day buildings date from later reconstructions, the temple preserves the architectural design of a Song dynasty (960–1279) monastery of the Chan School. It is the largest ancient temple complex in the city of Shanghai.

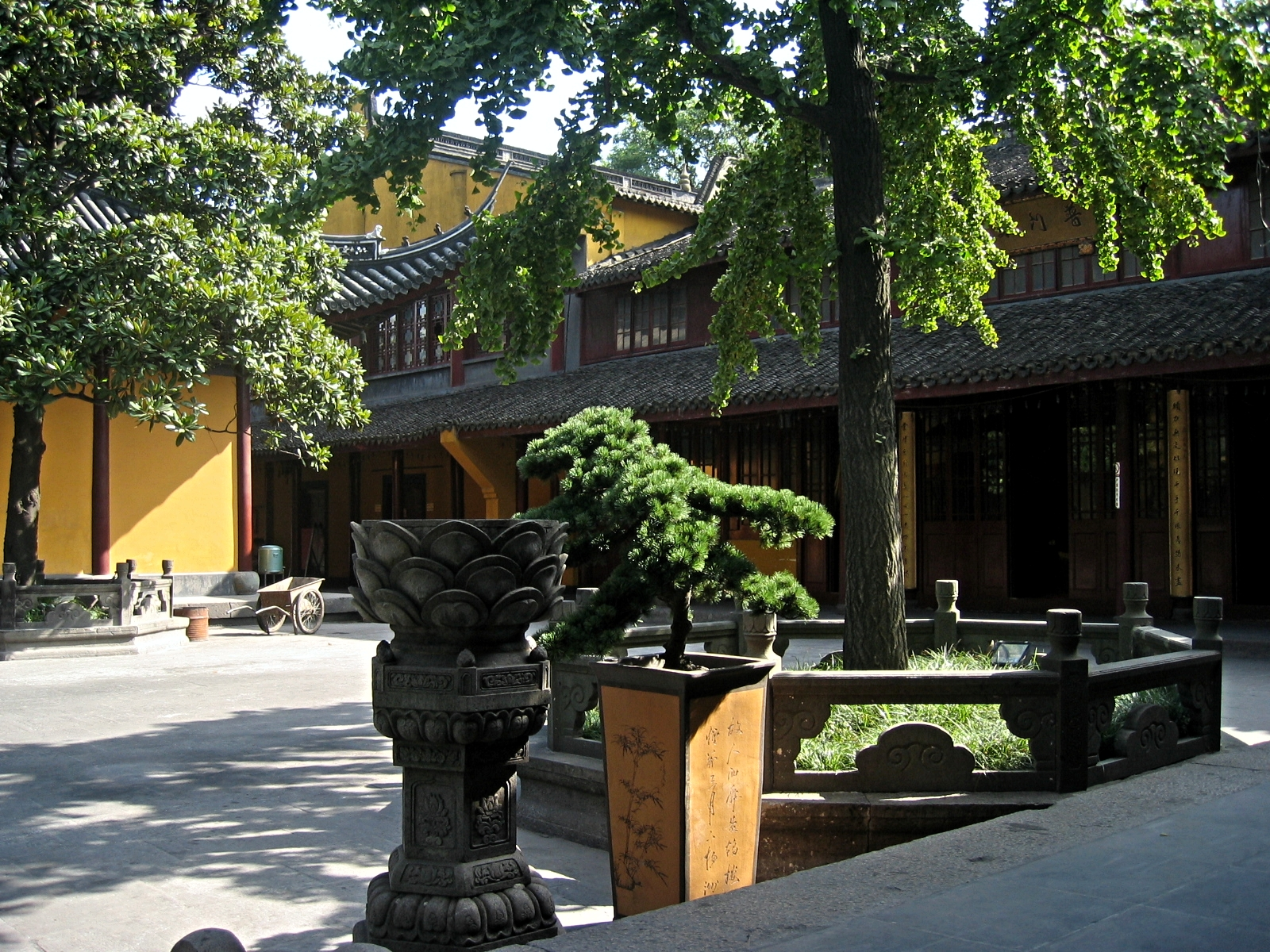
Longhua Temple inner courtyard

== History ==
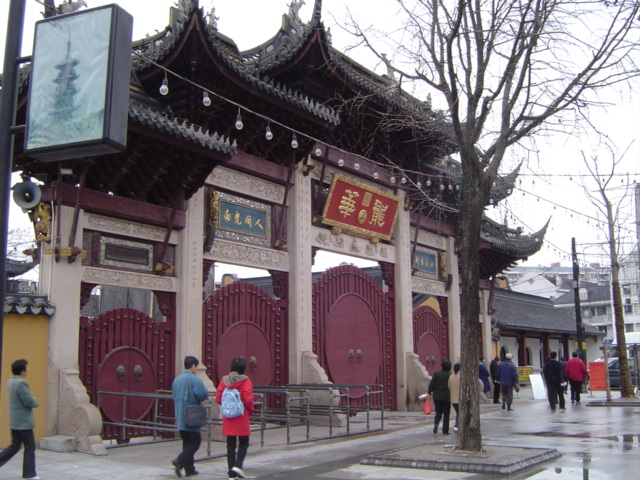
Newly constructed front gate of Longhua. The site of the original gates, further in front, is now marked by two standing pillars and a set of original stone lions.

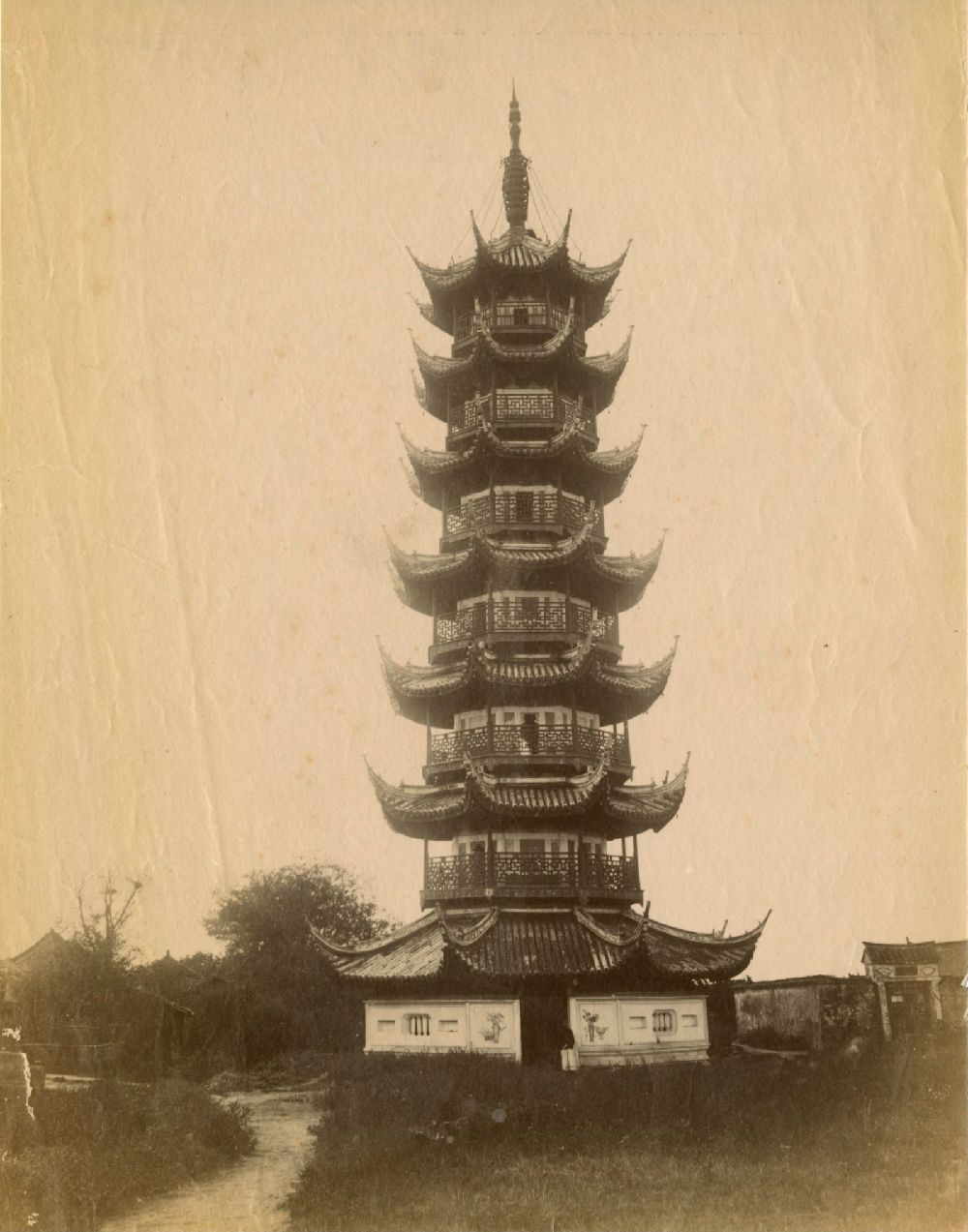
Photographer unknown, "Longhua Pagoda, Shanghai," n.d., Department of Image Collections, National Gallery of Art Library, Washington, DC

The temple was first built in 242 AD, during the Three Kingdoms period (220–280). According to a legend, Sun Quan, King of the Kingdom of Wu (222–280), had obtained Sharira relics, which are cremated remains of the Buddha. To house these precious relics, the king ordered the construction of 13 pagodas. Longhua Pagoda (龍華塔), part of the Longhua temple complex, is said to have been one of them. Like the function of the pagoda, the name of the temple also has its origin in a local legend according to which a dragon once appeared on the site.

The temple was destroyed by war towards the end of the Tang dynasty (618–907) and rebuilt in 977 AD, under the autonomous Kingdom of Wuyue during the Northern Song dynasty period (960–1127). (According to another version of the story, as contained in Song (960–1279) and Yuan dynasty (1271–1368) local histories, the temple was first built by the King of Wuyue.) Later in the Song dynasty, in 1064, it was renamed "Kongxiang Temple" (空相寺), but the original name "Longhua Temple" was restored in the Ming dynasty (1368–1644) during the reign of the Wanli Emperor (1573–1620).

The present architectural design follows the Song dynasty (960–1279) original. However, whereas the core of the present Longhua Pagoda survives from that period, most buildings in the temple proper were rebuilt during the reigns of the Tongzhi Emperor (1862–1874) and the Guangxu Emperor (1875–1908) in the Qing dynasty (1644–1911). A modern restoration of the entire temple complex was carried out in 1954.

The temple and monastery were originally surrounded by extensive gardens and orchards. Viewing of the peach blossom in the Longhua gardens was an annual attraction for people in surrounding cities.

The temple grounds have been used as a site for internment as well as for executions. Public executions were held on the site in the 20th century. In 1927, the Kuomintang (國民黨) carried out a purge of suspected communists in Shanghai. Thousands of victims of this purge were brought to the temple grounds to be executed. They are commemorated today by the Longhua Martyrs Cemetery behind the temple. During the Second Sino-Japanese War, the Japanese operated their largest civilian internment camp in the area, where American, British, as well as nationals of other allied countries were held under poor conditions.

The temple's extensive gardens have since been almost entirely absorbed into the neighboring Longhua Martyrs' Cemetery and have been extensively reconstructed in a contemporary monumental style. A small traditional garden remains immediately adjacent to the temple buildings.

== Architectural design and artwork ==
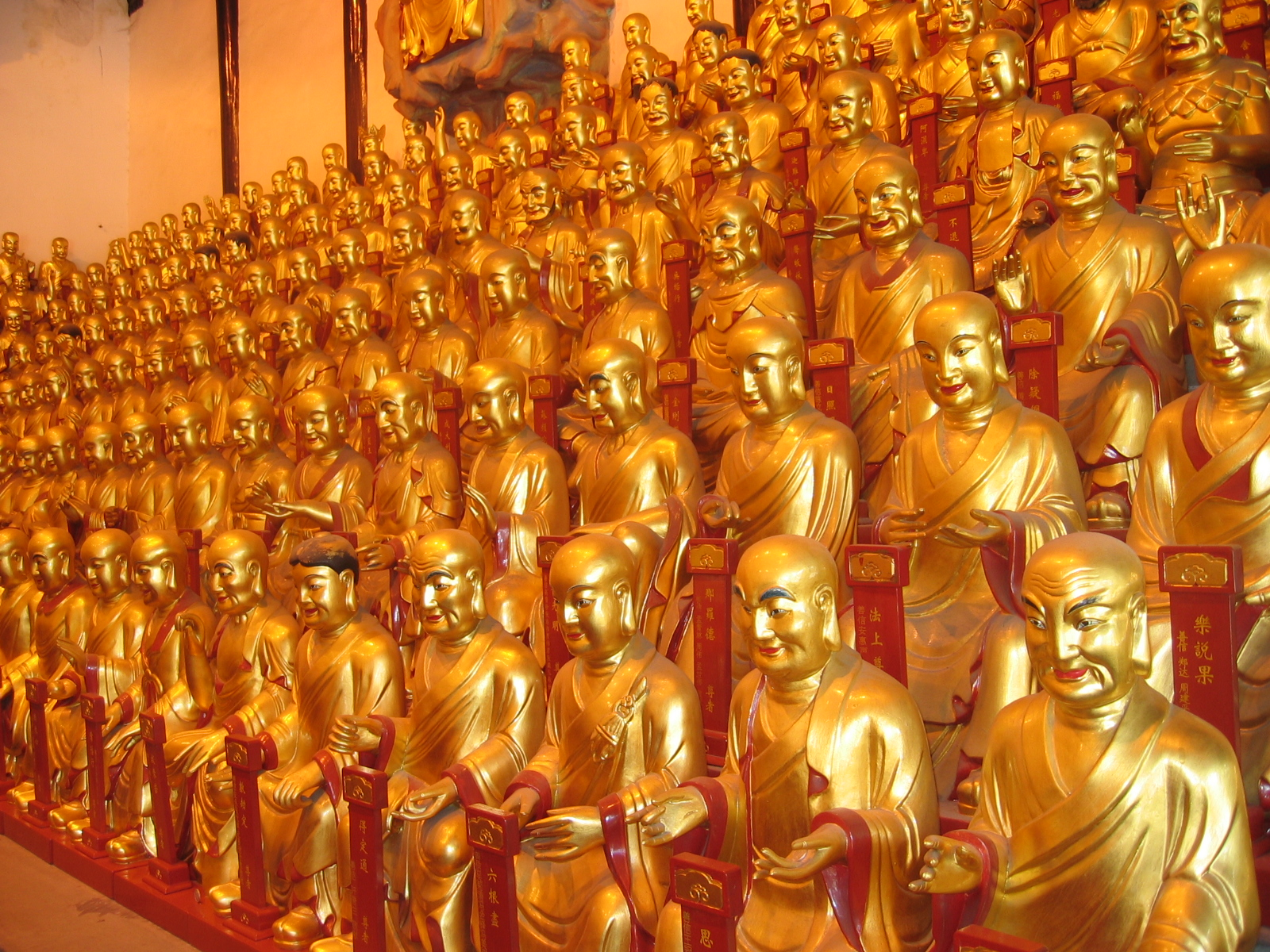
Statues of the 500 arhats

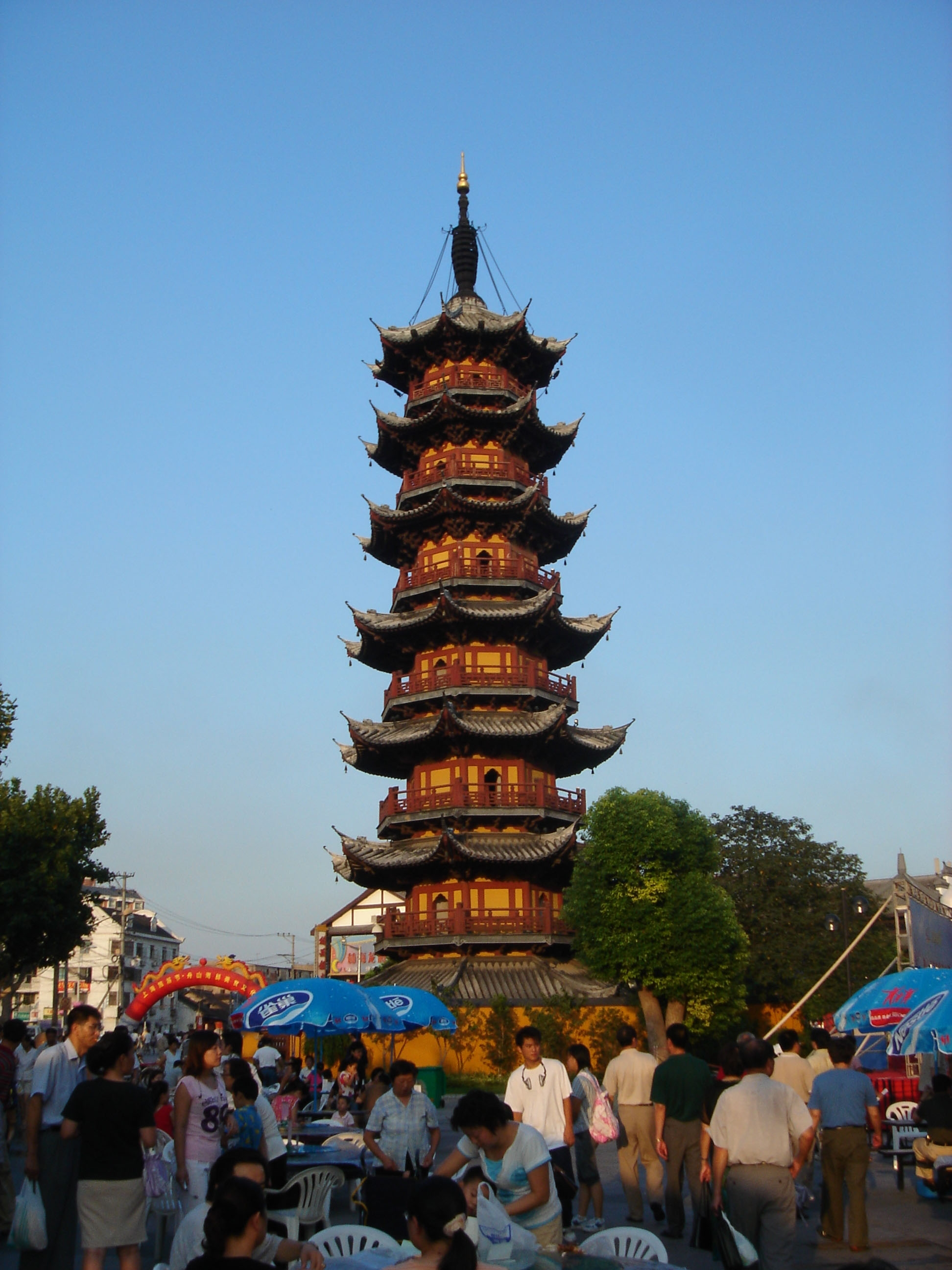
The exterior of the Longhua Pagoda

The Longhua Temple occupies an area of more than 20,000 square meters (215,000 sq ft) and the main axis of the compound is 194 meters (636 ft) long. The tallest structure is the Longhua Pagoda which stands 40.4 meters (132 ft 7 in) high.

The layout of the temple is that of a Song dynasty monastery of the Buddhist Chan sect, known as the Sangharama Five-Hall Style. Five main halls are arranged along a central north–south pointing axis. From the entrance or Shanmen, the buildings are:

=== Maitreya Hall ===
The Maitreya Hall housing a statue of Maitreya buddha and another in his manifestation as "Budai", or Cloth bag monk.

=== Four Heavenly Kings Hall ===
The Four Heavenly Kings Hall housing statues of the Four Heavenly Kings.

=== Mahavira Hall ===
The Mahavira Hall is the main hall, housing statues of the historical Buddha (Shakyamuni) and two disciples. At the back of the hall is a bas-relief carving, including a depiction of Guanyin, or the Bodhisattva Avalokiteśvara in his female manifestation. Around the front portion are arranged the twenty Guardians of Buddhist Law, and around the back the sixteen principal arhats. The hall also features an ancient bell cast in 1586, during the Wanli era of the Ming dynasty.

=== Three Sages Hall ===
The Three Sages Hall (三聖殿) houses statues of the Amitabha buddha, and the Bodhisattvas Avalokiteśvara (male form) and Mahāsthāmaprāpta.

=== Abbot's Hall ===
The Abbot's Hall (方丈室) is a place for lectures and formal meetings.

=== Bell tower and Drum tower ===
A Bell Tower and a Drum Tower are arranged off the central axis. The Bell Tower houses a copper bell cast in 1382, the bell is 2 meters (6 ft 7 in) tall, has a maximum diameter of 1.3 meters (4 ft 3 in), and weighs 5,000 kilograms (11,000 lb). The bell is used in the Evening Bell-Striking Ceremony conducted on New Year's Eve. Also situated off the main axis is a shrine to Ksitigarbha (Dizang the King Bodhisattva).

=== Buddhist Texts Library ===
The Buddhist Texts Library houses various versions of sutras and other Buddhist works, as well as ceremonial instruments, antiques, and artifacts.

Artworks in the temple include statues of the Maitreya Buddha in his Bodhisattva form and in his Cloth Bag Monk incarnation, statues of the Eighteen Arhats and 20 Guardians of Buddhist Law, as well as statues of the 500 arhats.

=== Longhua Pagoda ===
Longhua Pagoda

The Longhua Pagoda is best well-known of the 16 historic pagodas that still stand within the Shanghai municipality. It has an octagonal floor layout. The size of the seven stories decreases from bottom to top. The pagoda consists of a hollow, tube-like brick core surrounded by a wooden staircase. On the outside, it is decorated with balconies, banisters, and upturned eaves. These outer decorations have been reconstructed in keeping with the original style.

Although previous pagodas existed on the same site, the current brick base and body of the pagoda was built in 977 under the Wuyue kingdome (907–978), with continuous renovations of its more fragile wooden components on the exterior. Because of its age, the pagoda is fragile and is not open to the public.

== Temple fair ==
The Longhua Temple Fair has been held since the Ming dynasty annually on the third day of the third month of the Chinese Lunisolar Calendar, when - according to local legend - the dragons visit the temple to help grant the people's wishes. It coincides with the blossoming of the peach trees in Longhua Park. Since its inception, the fair has been an annual event interrupted only by the Cultural Revolution and the SARS outbreak.

== Location ==
The Longhua Temple is located on the Longhua area (formerly Longhua township) of Shanghai (named after the temple). Its street address is No. 2853 Longhua Road (Longhua Lu). It is open to the public for a fee (10 RMB) which includes incense. To go there by subway you can take line 12 followed by a bit of walking or bike riding.

== In popular culture ==
J. G. Ballard in his World War II-era autobiographical novel Empire of the Sun describes the Japanese military use of the Longhua pagoda as a flak cannon tower. In Steven Spielberg's film adaptation of the book, the pagoda is clearly visible above the prison camp.
