= Twin Pagodas (Suzhou) =

Buddhist temple in Suzhou

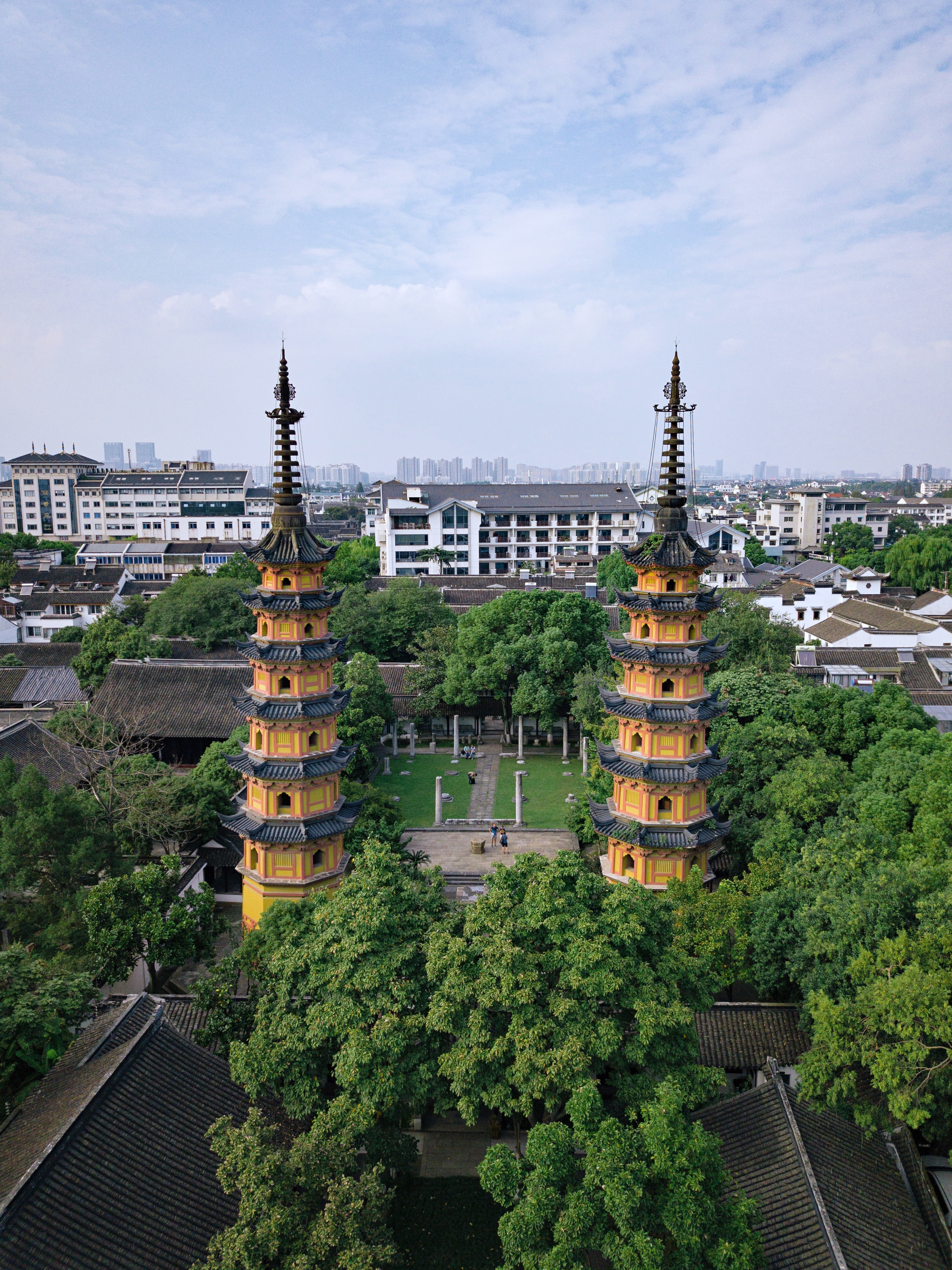
- The Twin Pagodas and the remains of the temple

- Location in Jiangsu Twin Pagodas (Suzhou) (China)

Religion
- Affiliation: Buddhism

Location
- Country: China
- Interactive map of Twin Pagodas
- Coordinates: 31.3089°N 120.6297°E

The Twin Pagodas are the main remnant of the Dinghui Buddhist temple in Suzhou, China.

Twin pagodas are a rare feature of Chinese temples, which usually had a single pagoda. Both are built of brick and they are similar in size, having eight sides and seven stories. Except for the octagonal room on the second floor, all rooms are square, each one staggered 45 degrees from the lower storey. The pagodas are about 30 metres high. Their steeples are made of iron and are long relative to the whole pagoda, which is also rare among ancient Chinese pagodas. Their names are Reliquary (Śarīra) Pagoda and Beneficial Virtue Reliquary Pagoda (or "Clarity Dispensing Pagoda" and "Beneficence Pagoda"). The pagodas were once called "Sarira Stupa" and "Sarira Stupa of Merits and Benevolence".

Columns, plinths and decapitated statues belonging to the Tang-era temple can be seen near the pagodas.

== History ==
The pagodas were constructed in 982 AD during the Northern Song period through a donation of Wang Wenhan and his brother.

The temple was originally called Banruo, then Luohan during the Five Dynasties, then the West Temple in the late 10th century and finally Dinghui at the end of 11th century. The temple burned down in the last years of the Yuan dynasty and was rebuilt by the joint effort of four monks. It was destroyed again during the Second Opium War in 1860.

Su Shi, a notable litterateur of the Song period, was a close friend of Shou Qin, the abbot of the Dinghui Temple. After the former was banished to distant Huizhou, Shou Qin sent him encouraging poems, Ten Odes on Hansha, and personal letters from Su Shi's son Su Mai. Su Shi composed a response which was engraved on the temple walls during Ming times. According to an intellectual joke, the Twin Pagodas represented brushes while the nearby black tower dedicated to the God of Literature represented an inkstone.
