= Budai =

Figure in Buddhist and East Asian religious traditions

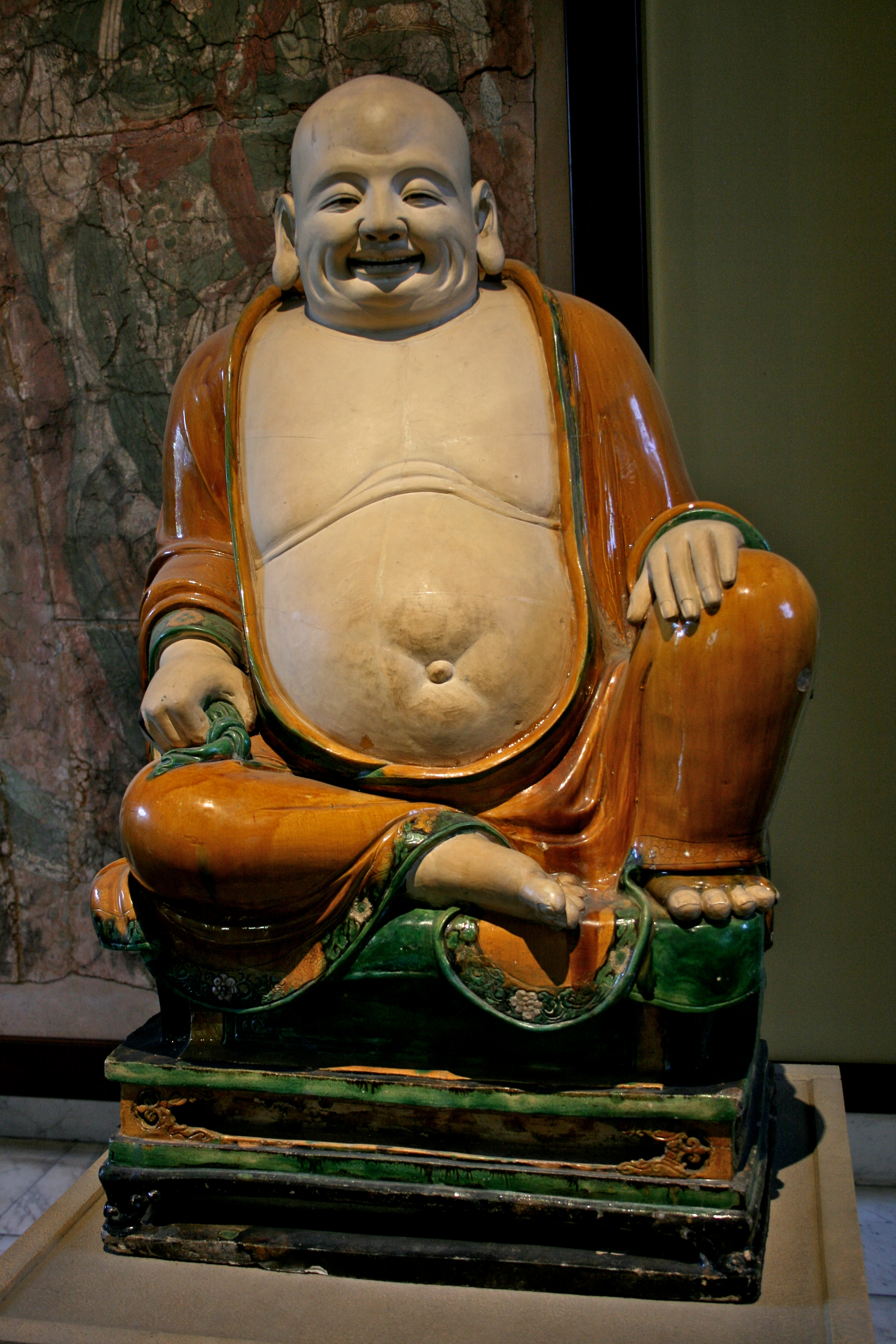
- Glazed ceramic sculpture of Budai. China, Ming dynasty, 1486.
- Died: 28 March 917

Chinese name
- Chinese: 布袋
Transcriptions
Standard Mandarin
- Hanyu Pinyin: bùdài
- Wade–Giles: Pu^{4}-tai^{4}
- IPA: [pûtâɪ]
Yue: Cantonese
- Yale Romanization: Bou-doih
- Jyutping: Bou3-doi6
- IPA: [pɔw˧tɔj˨]
Southern Min
- Hokkien POJ: Pò͘-tē

Alternative Chinese name
- Chinese: 笑佛
- Literal meaning: Laughing Buddha
Transcriptions
Standard Mandarin
- Hanyu Pinyin: Xiào Fó
- Wade–Giles: Hsiao^{4} Fo^{2}

Second alternative Chinese name
- Chinese: 胖佛
- Literal meaning: Fat Buddha
Transcriptions
Standard Mandarin
- Hanyu Pinyin: Pàng Fó
- Wade–Giles: P'ang^{4} Fo^{2}

Third alternative Chinese name
- Chinese: 快乐佛
- Literal meaning: Happy Buddha
Transcriptions
Standard Mandarin
- Hanyu Pinyin: Kuàilè Fó
- Wade–Giles: K'uali'he^{4} Fo^{2}

Vietnamese name
- Vietnamese alphabet: Bố Đại
- Chữ Hán: 布袋

Thai name
- Thai: พระปู้ไต้
- RTGS: Phra Pu Tai

Korean name
- Hangul: 포대
- Hanja: 布袋
Transcriptions
- Revised Romanization: Podae
- McCune–Reischauer: P'odae

Japanese name
- Kanji: 布袋
- Hiragana: ほてい
Transcriptions
- Romanization: Hotei

Budai (Note: Chinese: 布袋; pinyin: Bùdài; Korean: 포대, romanized: Podae; Japanese: 布袋, romanized: Hotei; Vietnamese: Bố Đại) is a nickname given to the historical Chinese monk Qieci (Chinese: 契此; pinyin: qiècǐ) in the Later Liang Dynasty, who is often identified with and venerated as the future Buddha Maitreya in Chan Buddhism and Buddhist scripture. With the spread of Chan Buddhism, he also came to be venerated in Vietnam, Korea, and Japan.

The name "Budai" literally means "cloth sack", and refers to the bag he is often depicted carrying as he wanders. His jolly nature and eccentric lifestyle distinguish him from most Buddhist masters or figures. He is almost always shown smiling or laughing, hence his nickname in Chinese, the "Laughing Buddha". Budai is traditionally depicted as having a huge stomach (possibly a symbol of abundance or forgiveness) and many stories surrounding Budai involve his love of food and drink. Because of this, he is also referred to as the "Fat Buddha", especially in the Western world, where he is often mistaken for Gautama Buddha.

The main textual record of Budai's life resides in a collection of Chan Buddhist biographies known as The Transmission of the Lamp.

== Hagiography ==
The origins of Budai are centred on cult worship and local legend. He is traditionally depicted as a fat, bald monk wearing a simple robe. He carries his few possessions in a cloth sack, being poor but content. His figure appears throughout Chinese culture as a representation of both contentment and abundance. Budai was able to predict people's fortunes and even weather patterns. He slept wherever he arrived, even outside, for he could ward off the bitter cold. A note dated 28 March 917 claims that he was an incarnation of Maitreya, the Buddha of the Future. A body allegedly belonging to Budai was displayed at the eastern section of the Great Hall at Yuelin Temple in Fenghua District, Zhejiang.

== In Chan Buddhism ==
Budai was one of several "uncommitted saints" that became incorporated into the Chan pantheon. Similar figures from the lamp histories were not inducted into the Chan patriarchal line. Instead, these obscure figures represented the "special transmission" that occurred during the early to mid 12th century. This transmission did not rely on patriarchal lineage legitimacy but instead used the peculiar personalities and qualities of various folkloric figures to illustrate the Chan tradition's new commitment to the idea of "awakening" and the propagation of Chan to a larger congregation. The Chan Masters Dahui Zonggao (1089–1163) and Hongzhi Zhengjue (1091–1157) were both leaders in the initial merging of local legend and Buddhist tradition. They hoped the induction of likable and odd figures would attract all types of people to the Chan tradition, no matter their gender, social background, or complete understanding of the dharma and patriarchal lineage.

Bernard Faure summarizes this merging of local legend and Chan tradition by explaining, "One strategy in Chan for domesticating the occult was to transform thaumaturges into tricksters by playing down their occult powers and stressing their this-world aspect..." The movement allocated the figures as religious props and channeled their extraordinary charismas into the lens of the Chan pantheon in order to appeal to a larger population. Ultimately, Budai was revered from both a folkloric standpoint as a strange, wandering vagabond of the people as well as from his newfound personage within the context of the Chan tradition as a 'mendicant priest' who brought abundance, fortune, and joy to all he encountered with the help of his mystical "cloth sack" bag.

== In art ==
Budai is almost always depicted with his cloth sack that looks like a large bag. The bag serves as a prominent motif within the context of Chan Buddhism as it represents abundance, prosperity, and contentment. Ink paintings such as these attributed to Budai often had an inscription and seal that signaled to high-ranking officials. For example, Budai and Jiang Mohe was inscribed by Chusi Fanqi, who was closely related to Song Lian (1310–1381) and Wei Su (1295–1372).

After Chan Buddhism was transmitted to Japan around the 13th century as Zen Buddhism, the devout monastics and laymen of the area utilized figure painting to portray the characters central to this "awakening" period of Zen art. Many of the eccentric personalities that were inducted into the Zen tradition like Budai were previously wrapped up in the established culture and folklore of Japan. The assimilation and reapplication of these wondrous charismas to the Zen pantheon assisted in the expansion of the Zen tradition.

As the images demonstrate, Budai is most jubilant when in the presence of others, especially children. When depicted with other gods in the Seven Lucky Gods, Budai maintains a solemn or even depressed countenance. Budai's round figure comes into practical use through the sculpting of the incense box (18th century) that splits the monk's body into two halves. The newer images such as Hotei and Children Carrying Lanterns (19th century) employs much more color, dramatization of physical features, and detail than the older pieces such as Hotei from Mokuan Reien (1336) that employs much more wispy and heavily contrasting outlines of his figure with no color or assumed setting.

Japanese iconography, like that of Zen master Hakuin Ekaku, shows Budai in a multiplicity of representative actions, like entertaining passersby, sheltering children under an umbrella and meditating using his sack as a cushion. In an especially known motif, Budai appears smoking in a kiseru and exhaling Otafuku, an ugly but charming prostitute that embodies Zen happiness, in a humorous reflection of the tradition according to which Shandao exhaled Amida, Kannon and Seishi with a prayer. The smooth lumpfish is known in Japan as hotei-uo ("Budai fish") due to its rotund appearance.

=== Sculpture ===
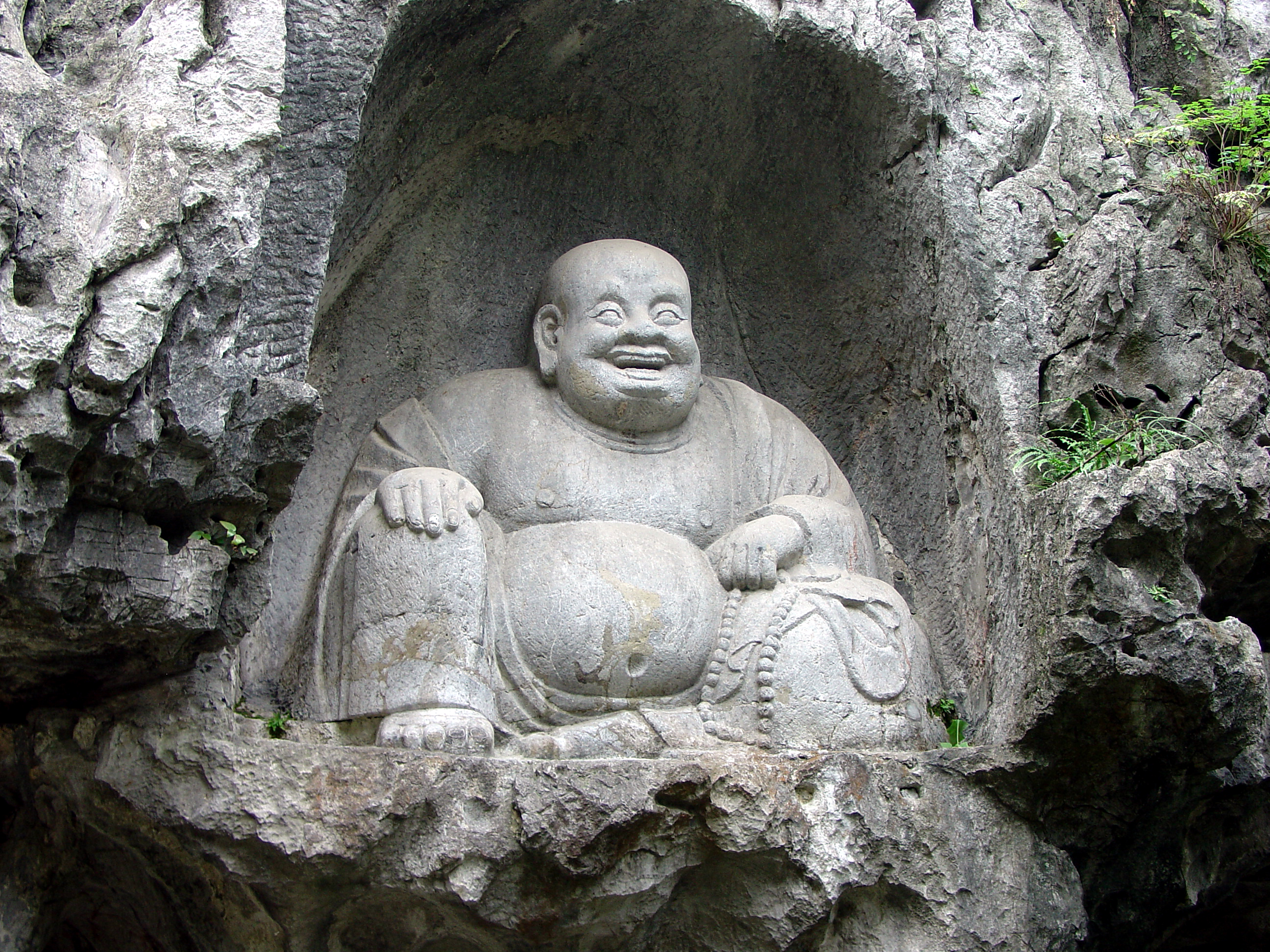
Sculpture of Budai at the Feilai Feng grottoes in Zhejiang, China. Northern Song dynasty, 11th century.

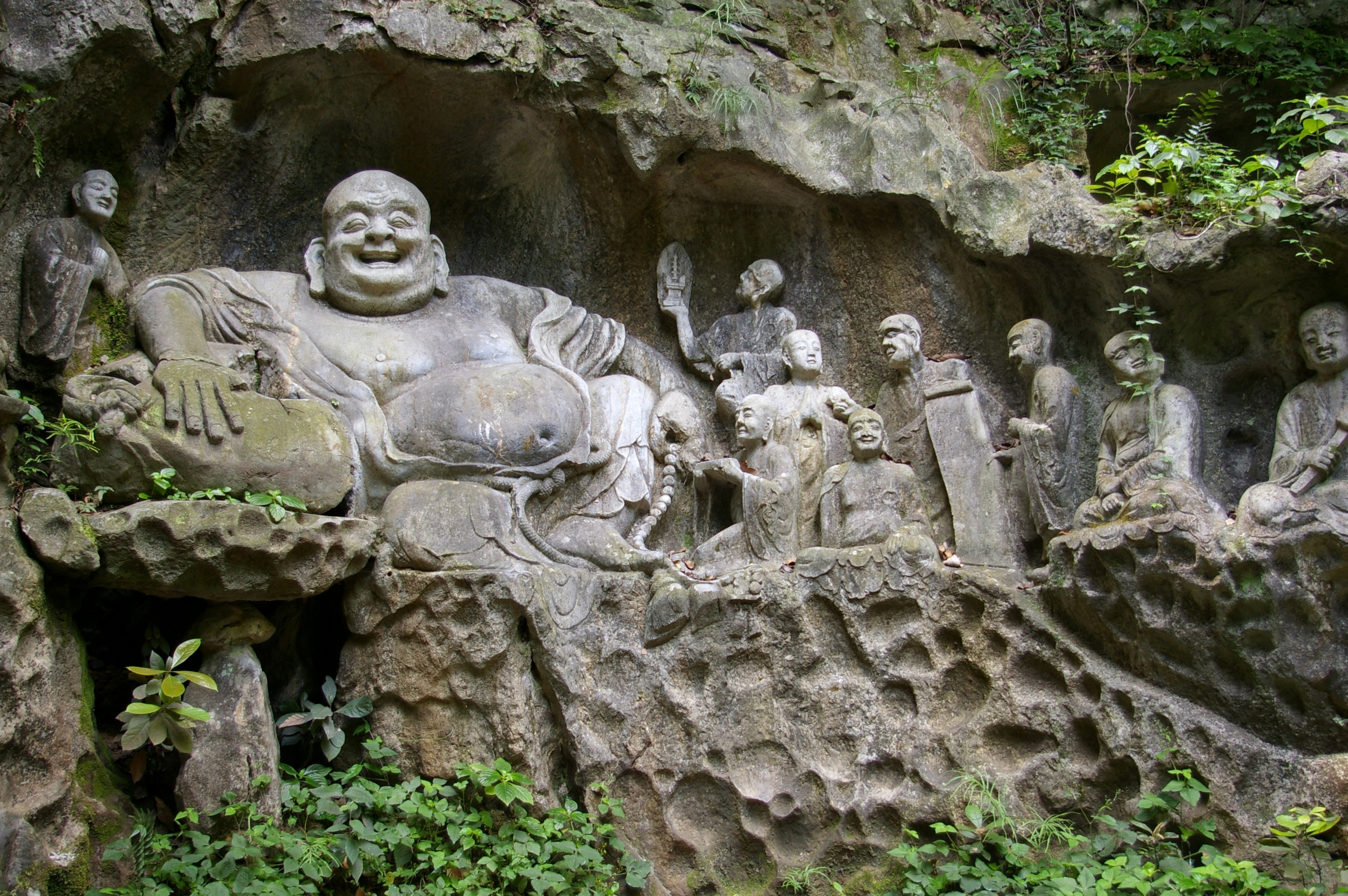
Budai as Maitreya at the Feilai Feng grottoes, depicted with disciples

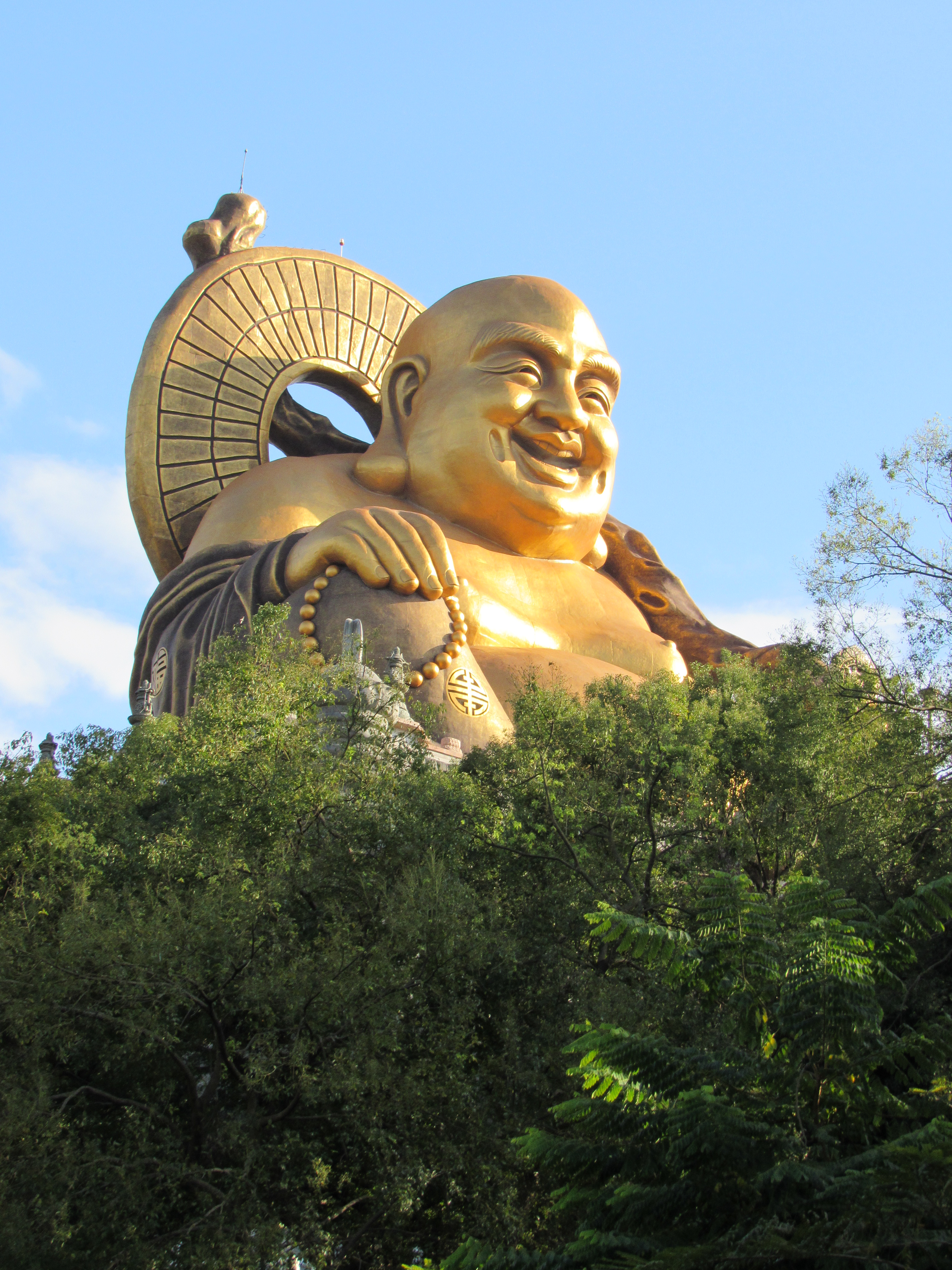
Statue of Budai at Hushan Temple in Taiwan

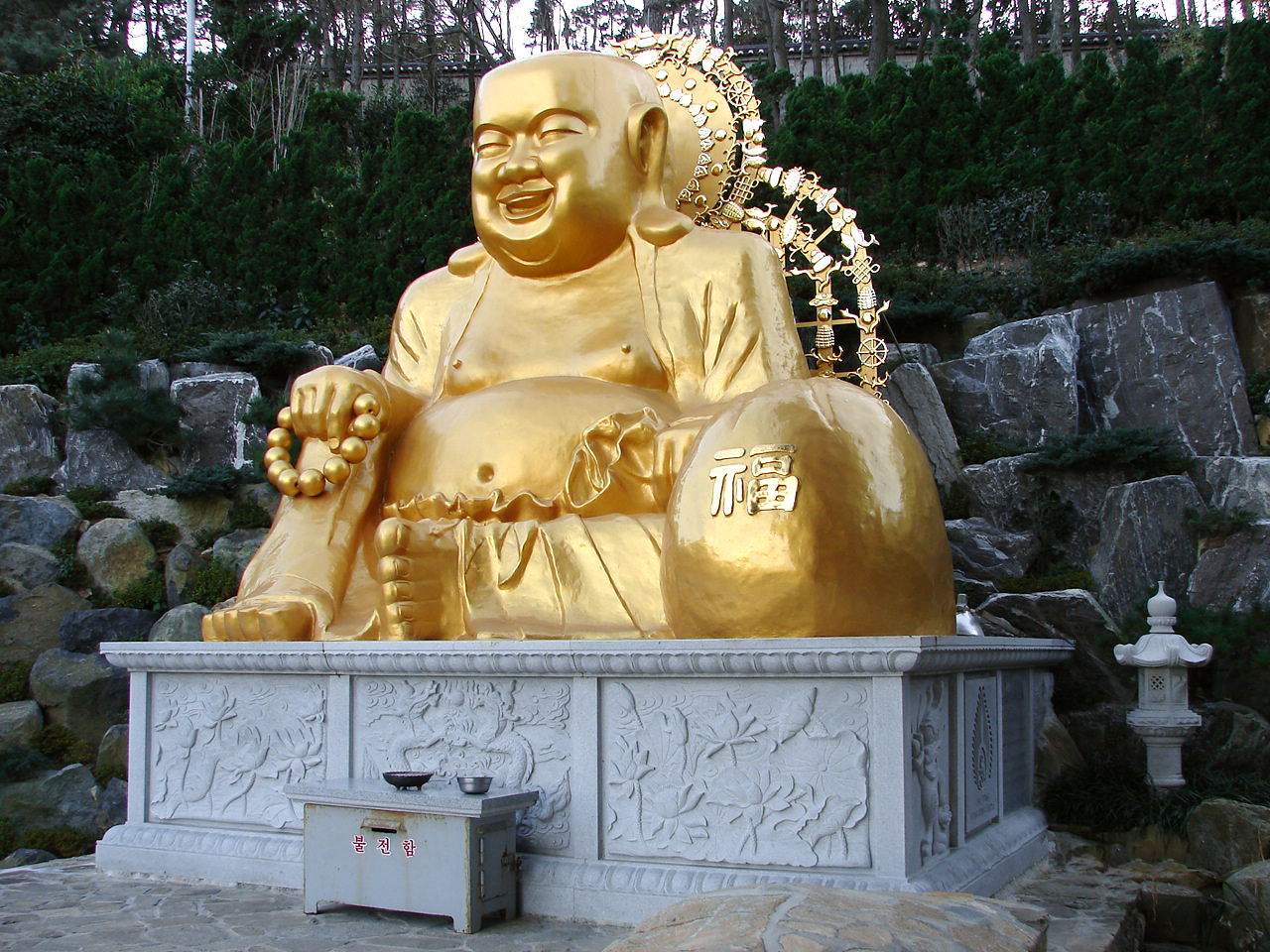
Statue of Budai as Maitreya at Haedong Yonggungsa temple in South Korea

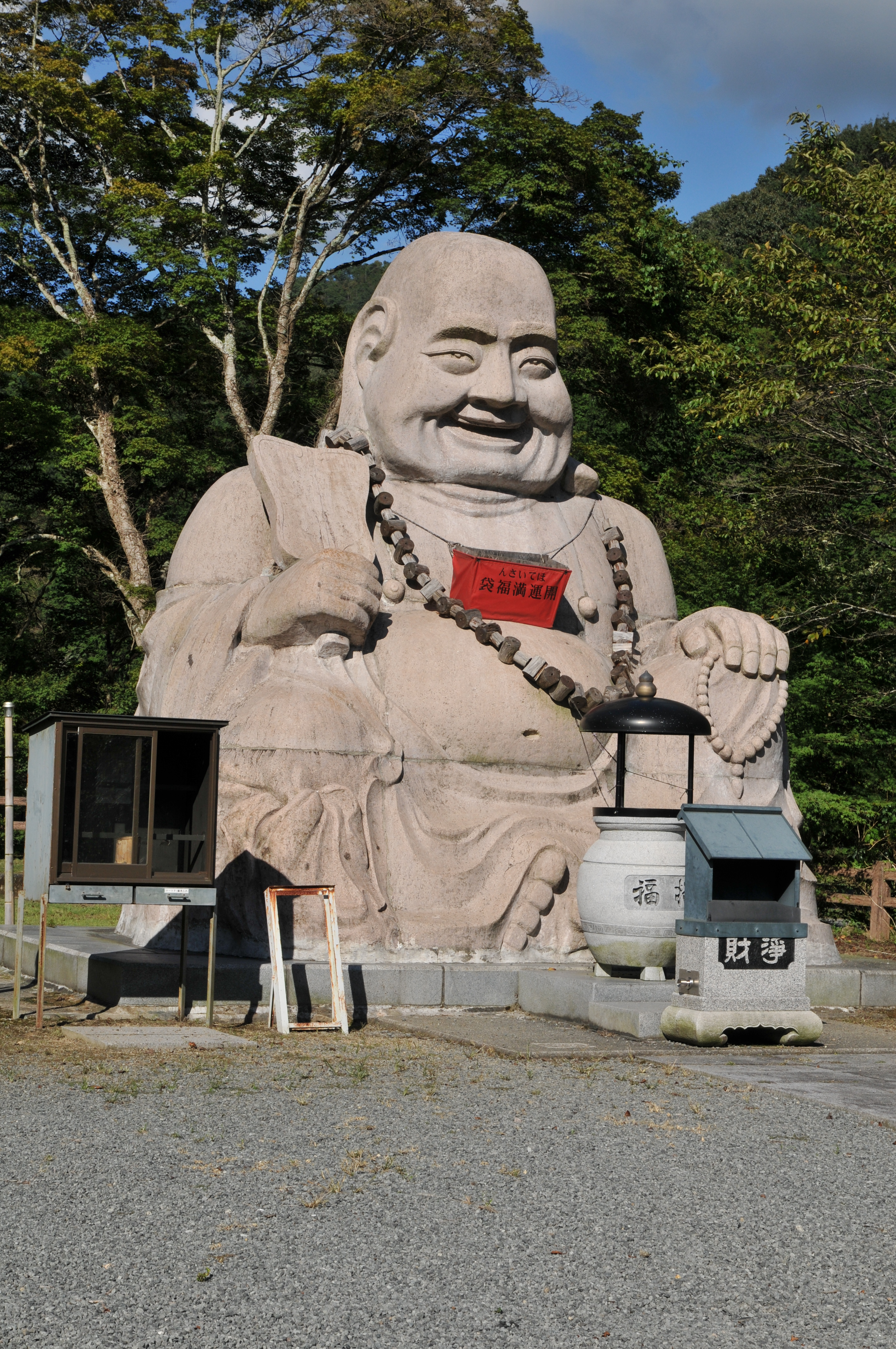
Statue of Budai at Miroku-ji in Himeji city, Hyōgo Prefecture, Japan. It is the largest Budai sculpture in Japan.

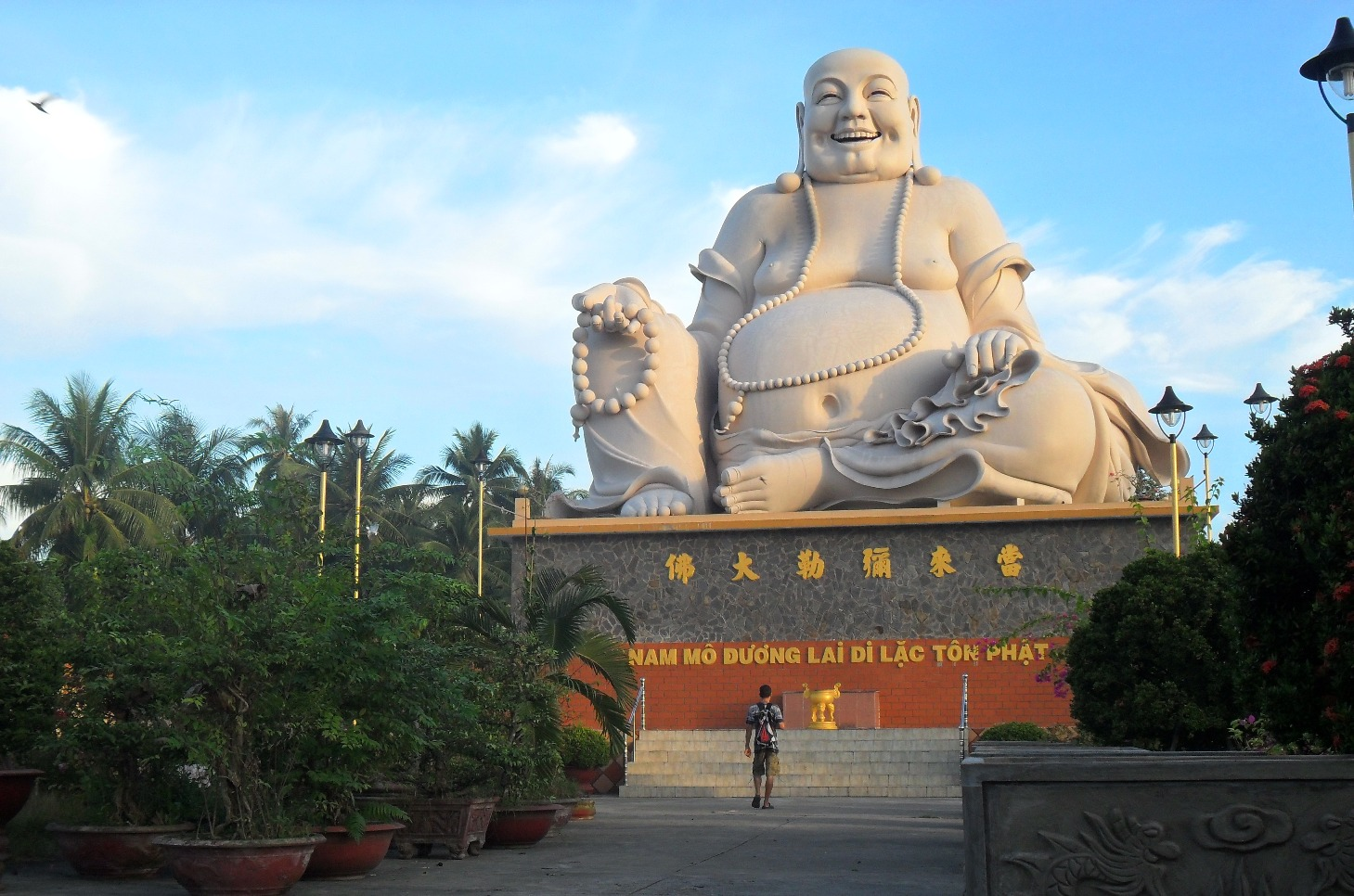
Statue of Budai at Vĩnh Tràng Temple in Vietnam

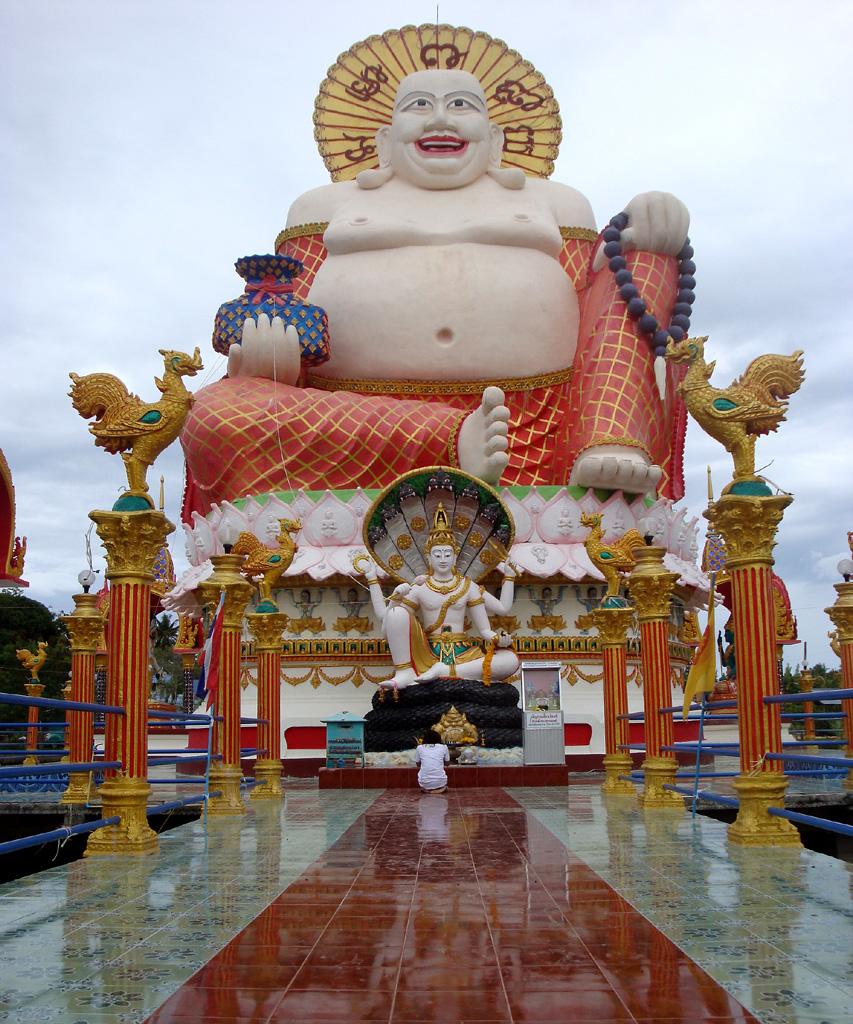
Statue of Budai at Ko Samui island, Thailand

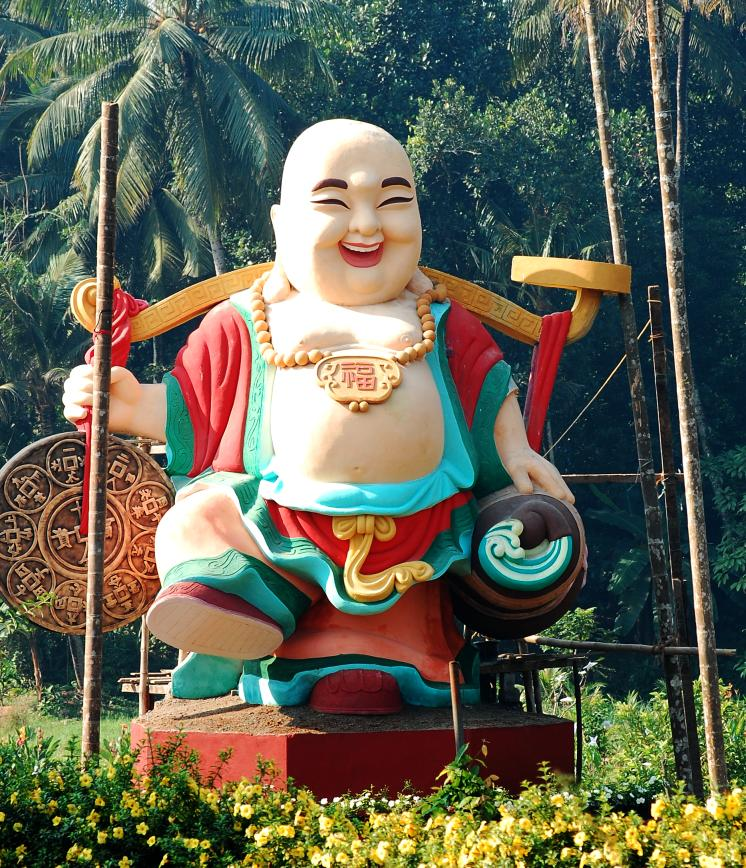
Statue of Budai in the Chinese style at Chalakudy, Kerala, India

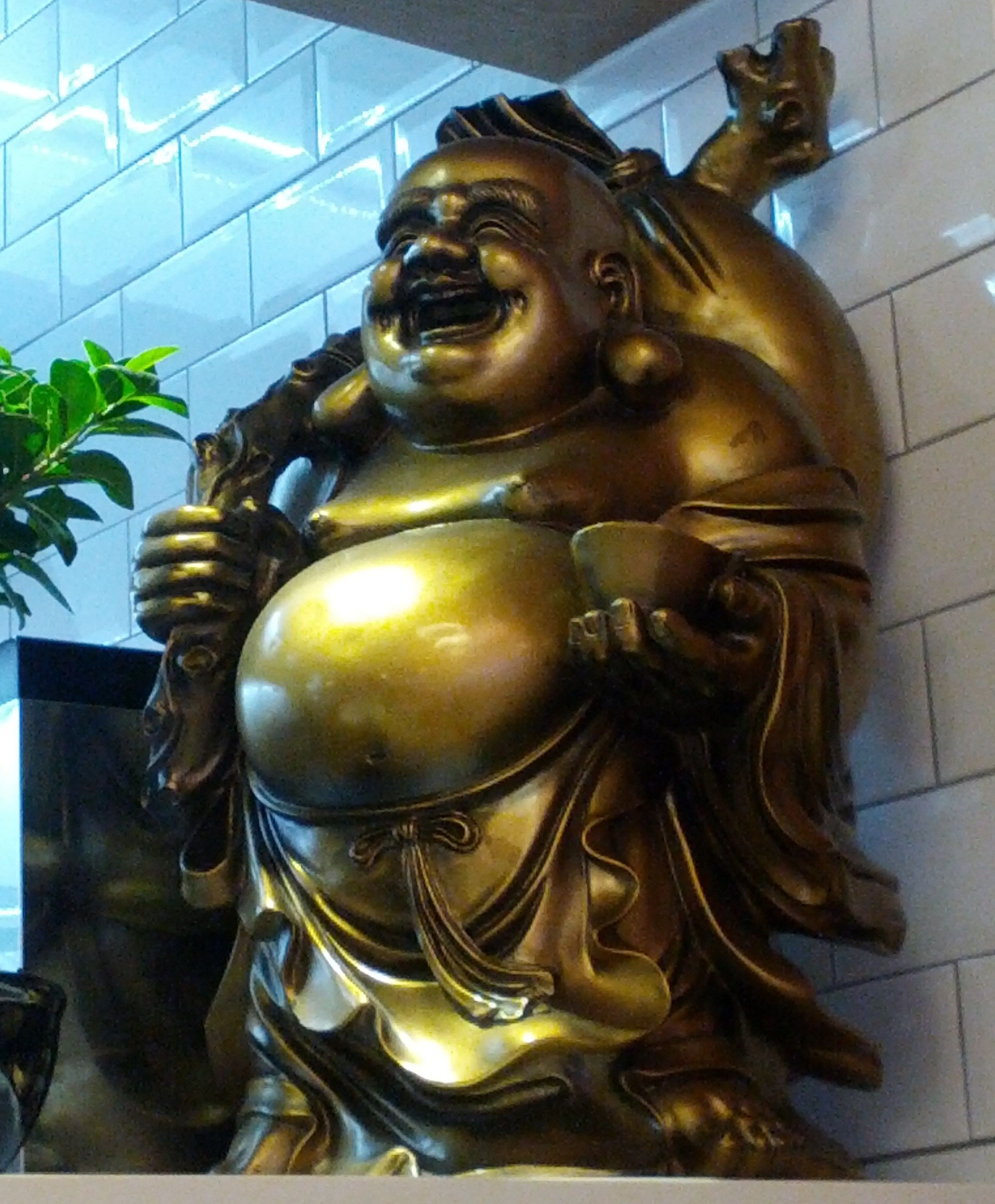
Small statue at a cafe in Birmingham, United Kingdom

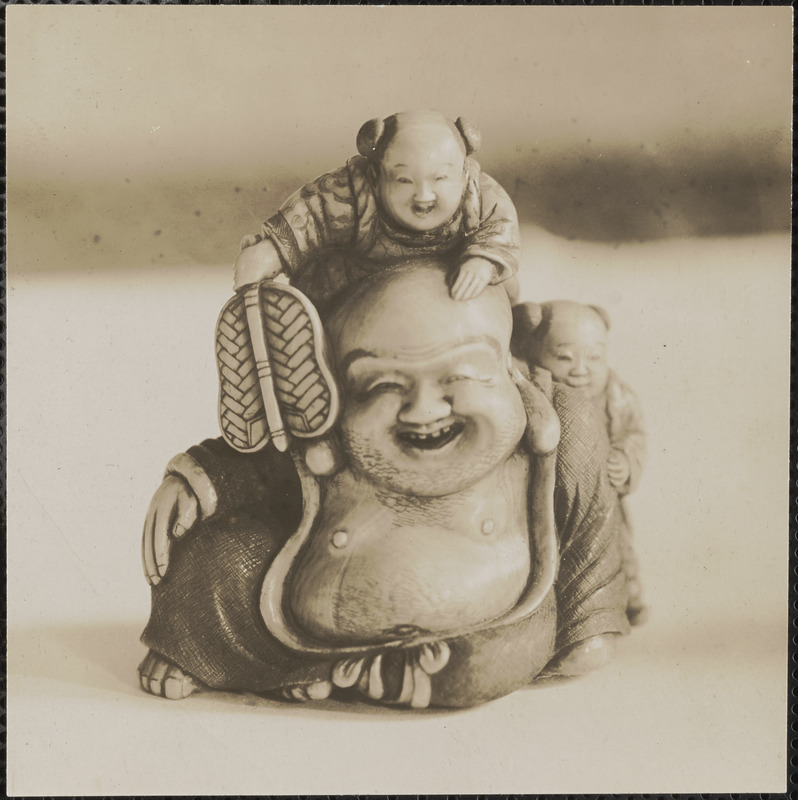
Figure of Budai, "Laughing Buddha", c. 1920–1960. Leon Abdalian Collection, Boston Public Library

=== Paintings ===
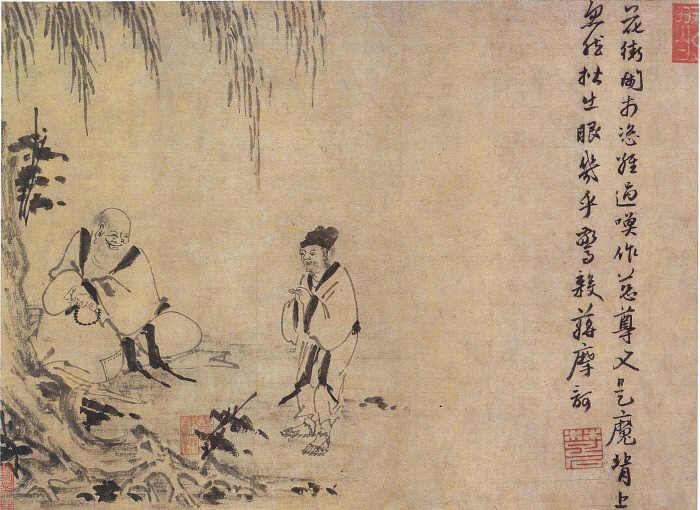
Budai and Jiang Mohe Discussing Buddhism, by Yintuoluo and inscribed by Chushi Fanqi. Circa 1350.

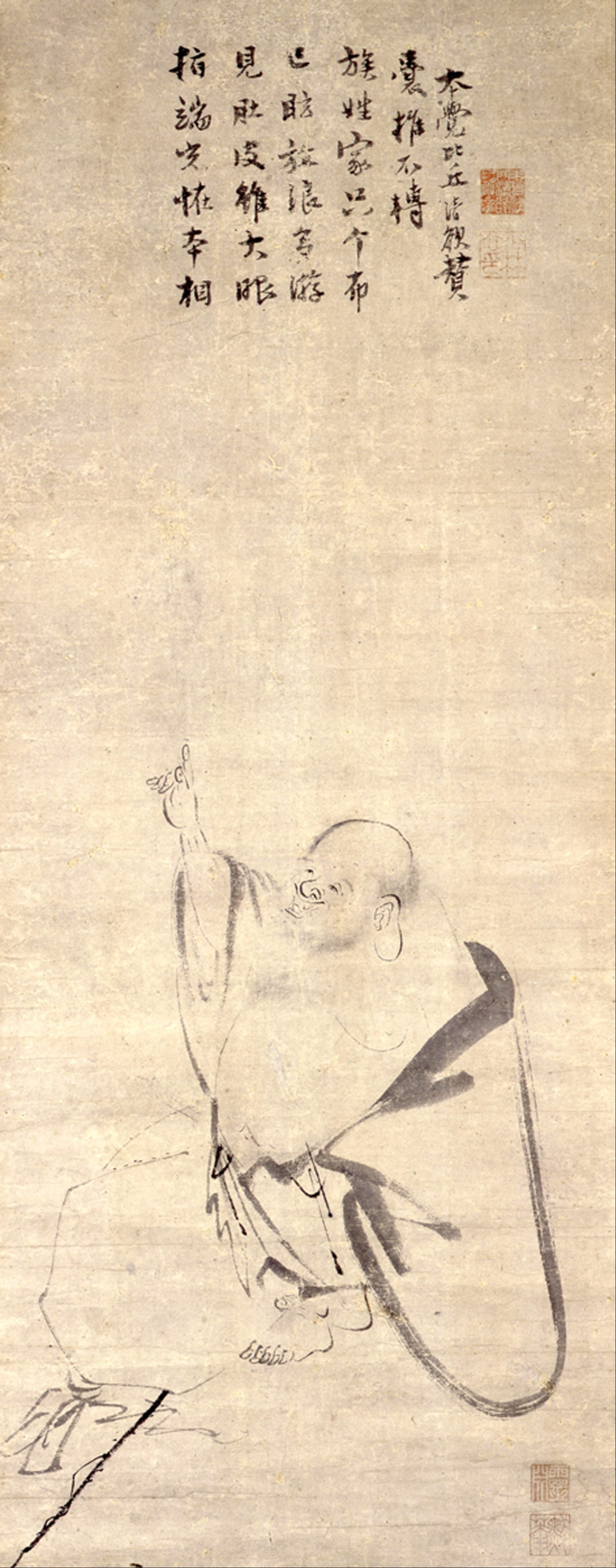
Hanging scroll showing Hotei, by Mokuan Reien and inscribed by Liao'an Qingyu. 14th century.

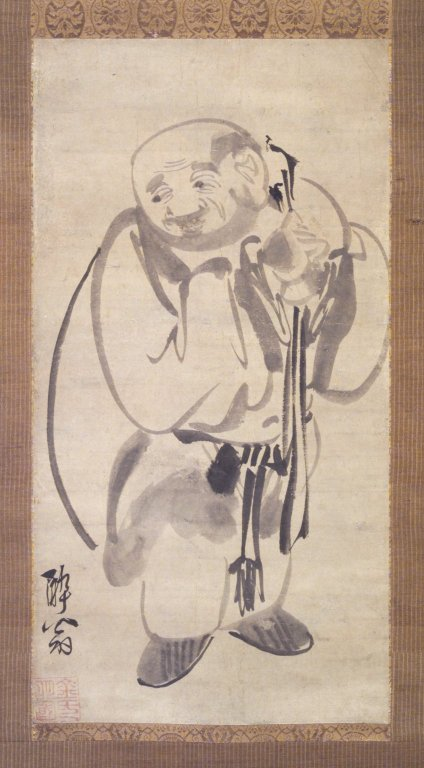
Painting of Podae, by Kim Myong-kuk, Joseon dynasty, 1600–1650

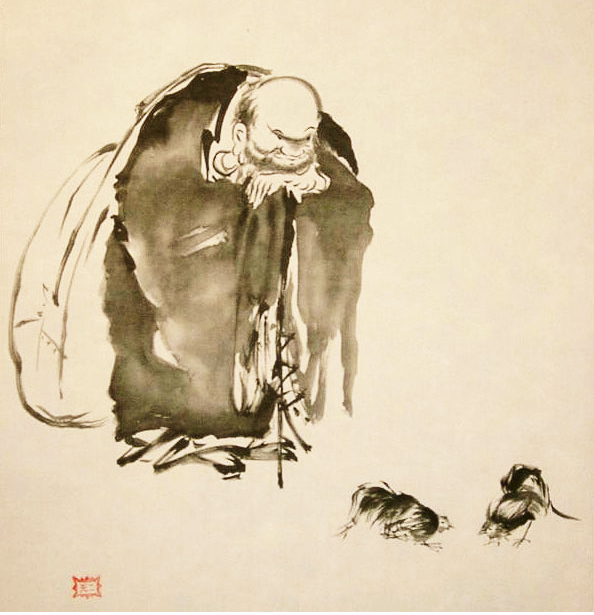
Painting of Hotei watching two cocks fighting, by the famous swordsman Miyamoto Musashi (1584–1645)

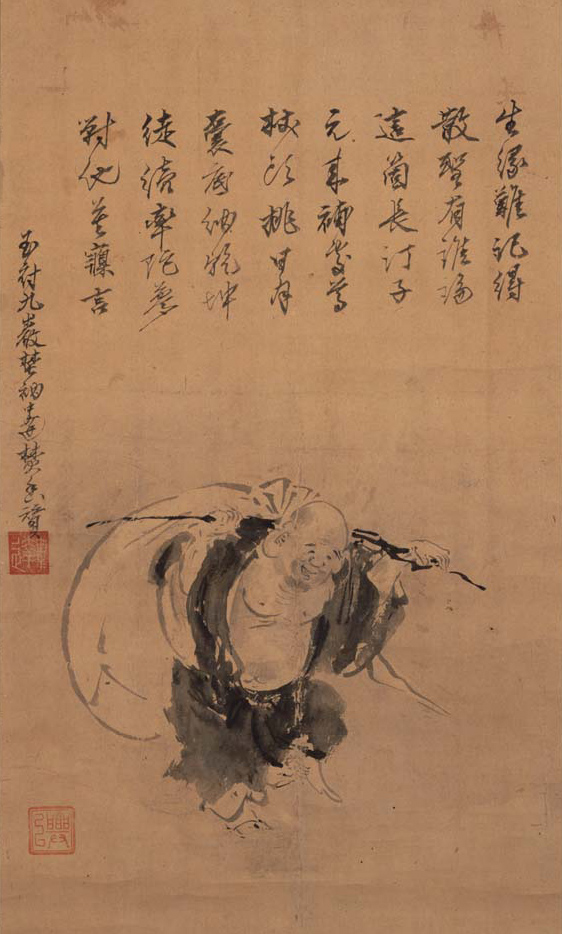
Painting of Hotei, by Kanō Kōi of the Kanō school. Early 17th century.

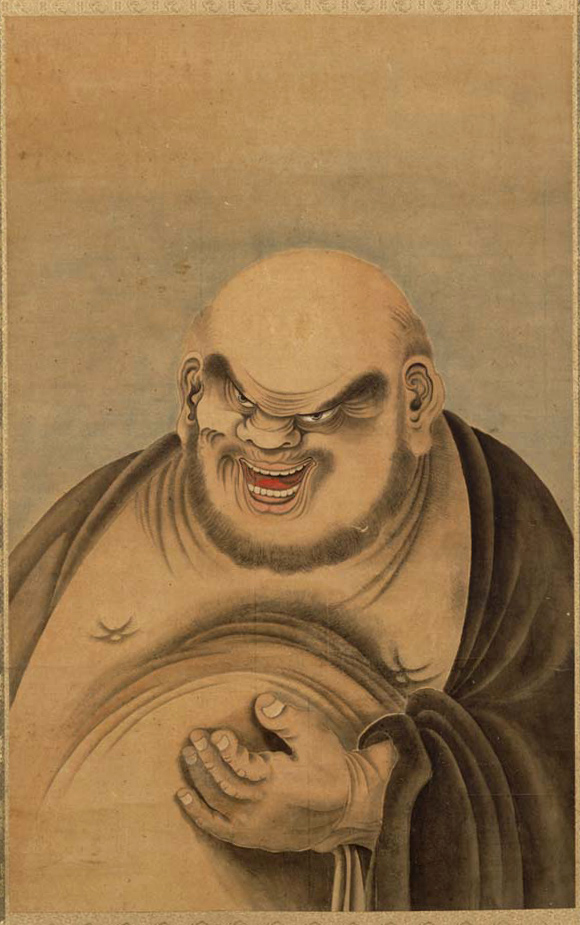
Hotei lifting his belly, a stereotypical depiction based on earlier Chinese copies. Painting by Odano Naotake (1750–1780), Edo period.

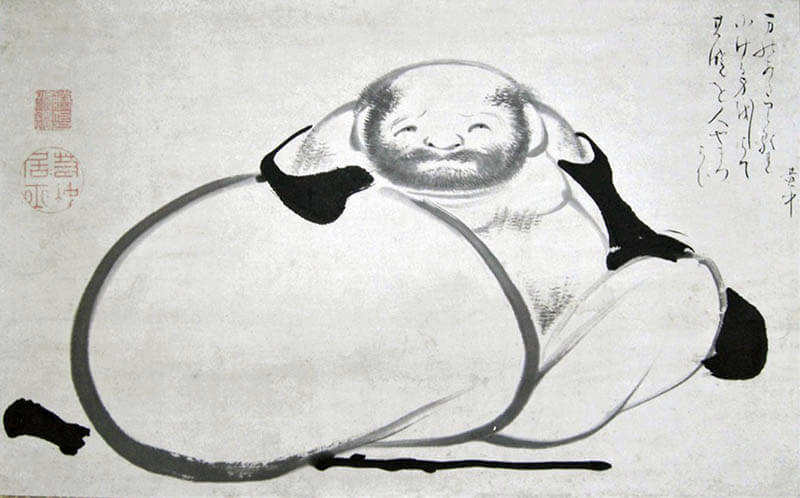
Minimalist painting of Hotei and his bag, by Itō Jakuchū (1716–1800), Edo period

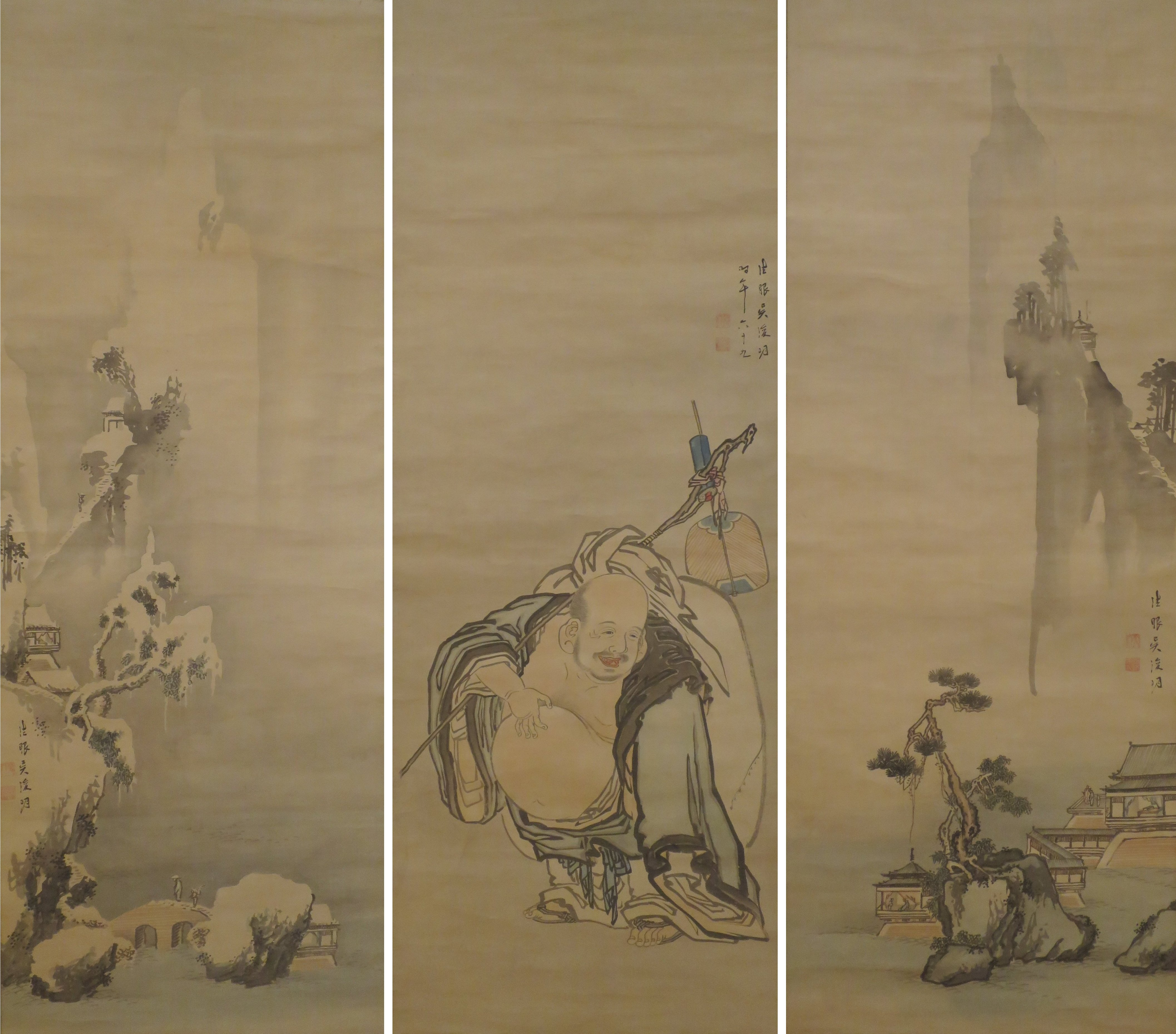
Hotei With Summer and Winter Landscapes. Triptych by Igarashi Shunmei (1768), Edo period.

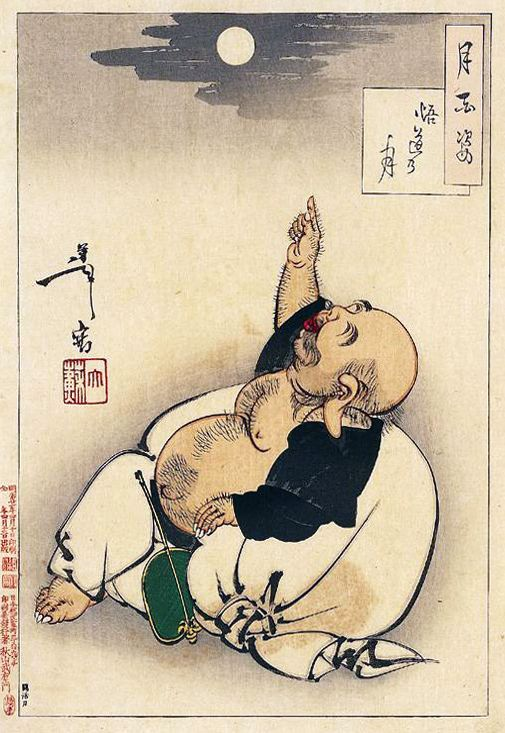
The Moon of Enlightenment, depicting Hotei pointing at the Moon. From the print series One Hundred Aspects of the Moon by Tsukioka Yoshitoshi. 1885–1891, Meiji Era.

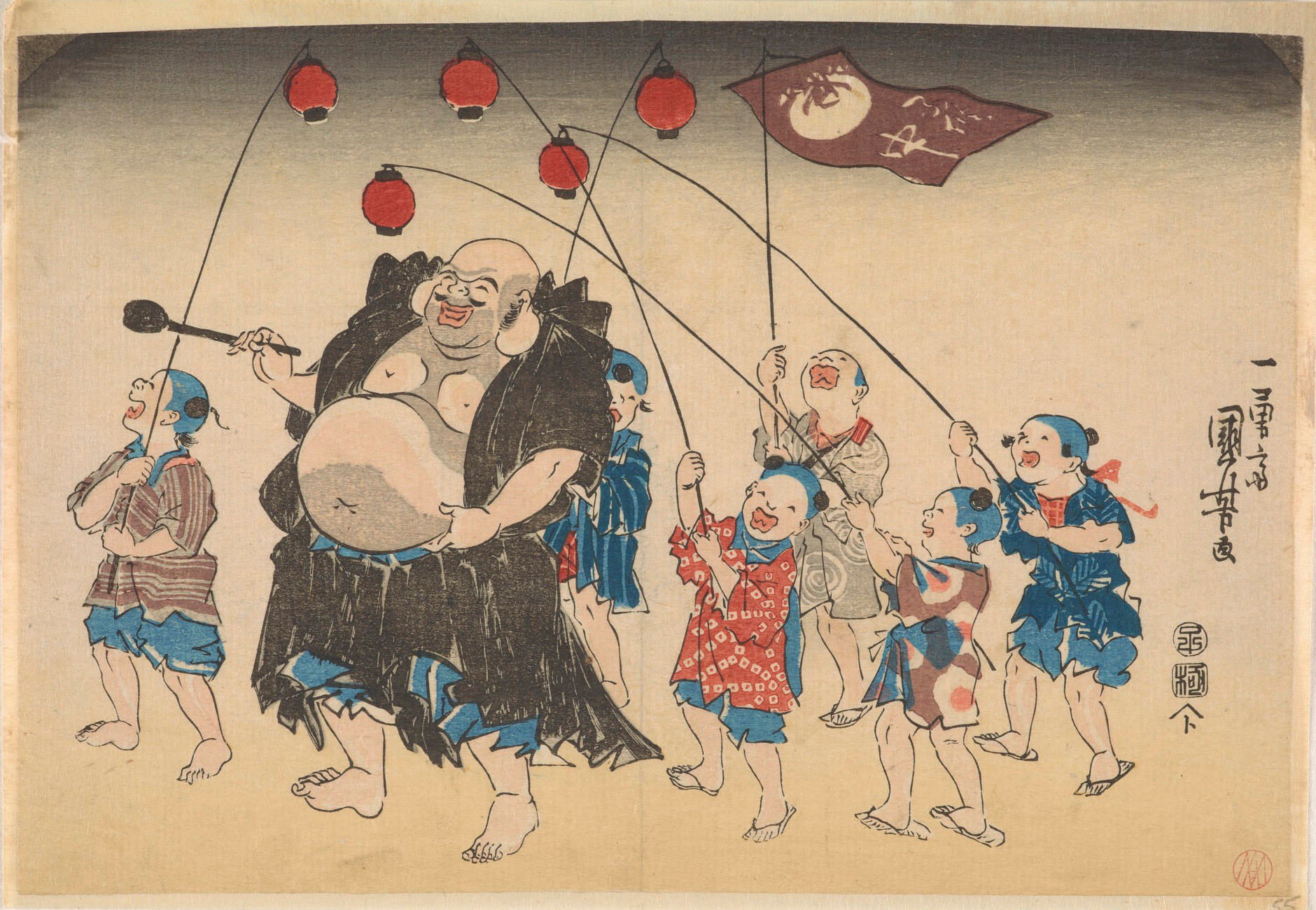
Hotei and Children Carrying Lanterns, by Utagawa Kuniyoshi. 19th century.

=== Crafts ===
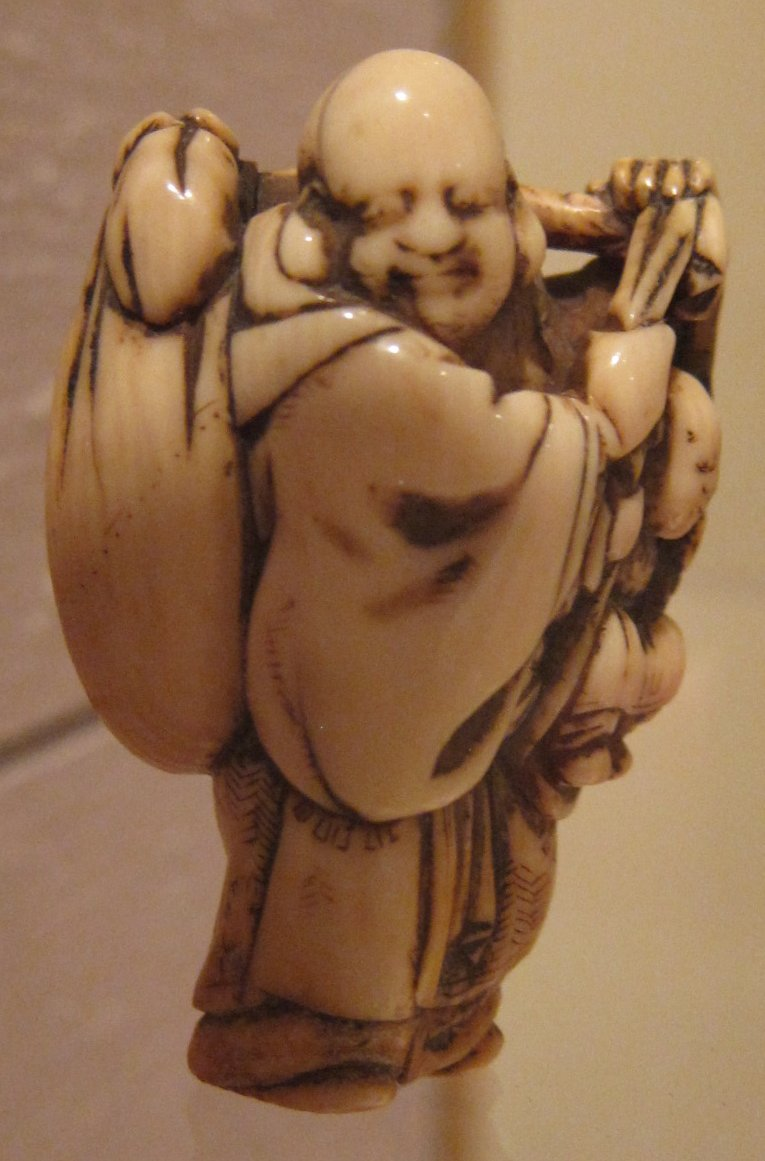
Ivory netsuke depicting Hotei. Japan, 17th century.

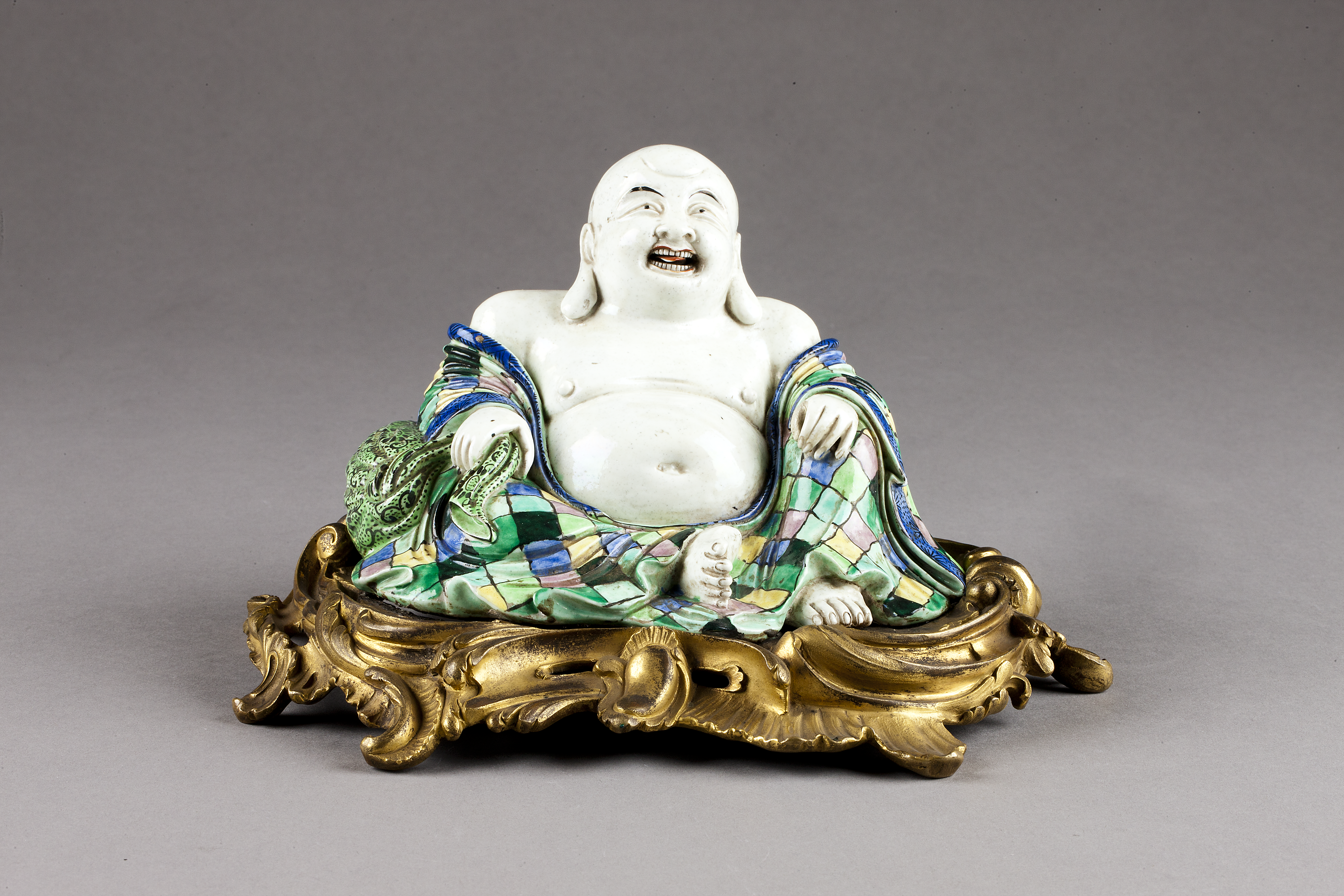
Chinese porcelain figure of Budai with European ormolu stand. Qing dynasty, 1720–1730.

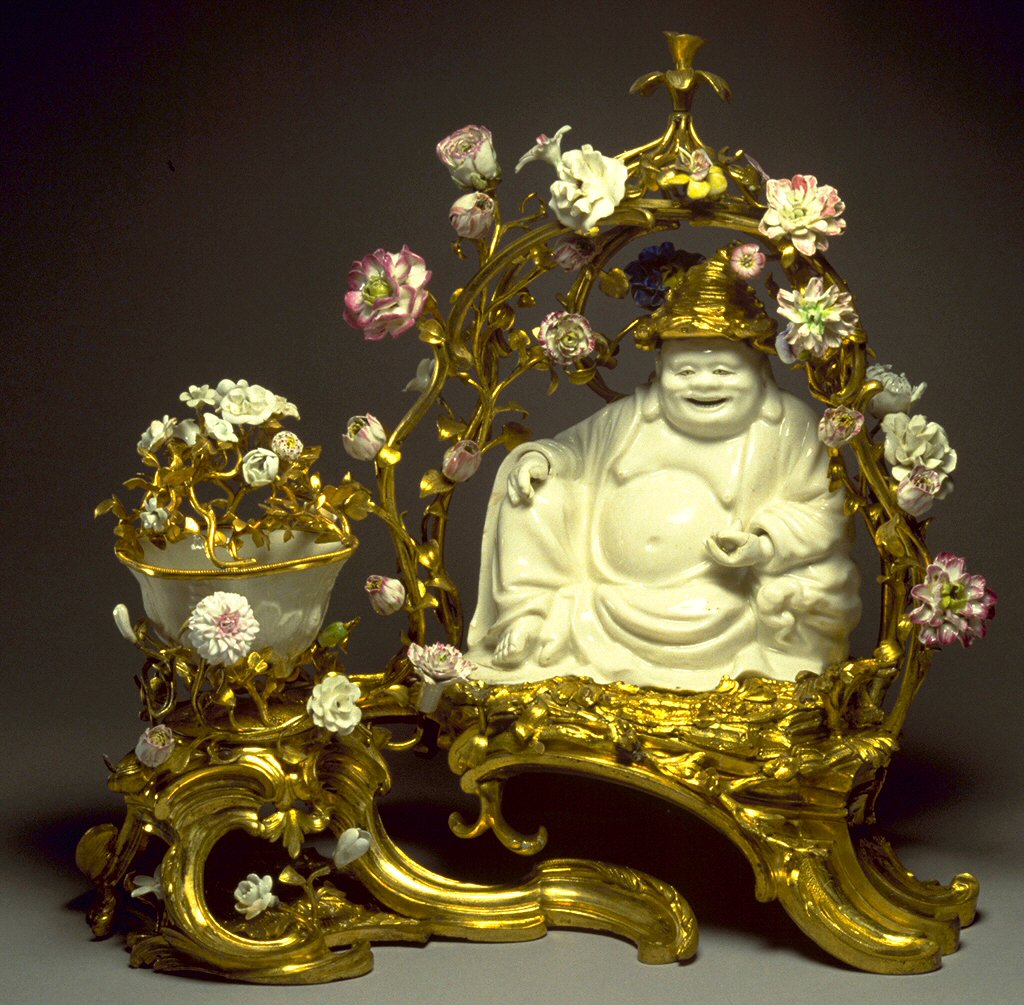
Scent container featuring a Chinese porcelain figure of Budai with French ormolu gilding and added porcelain flowers, an example of chinoiserie art. France, 1745–1749.

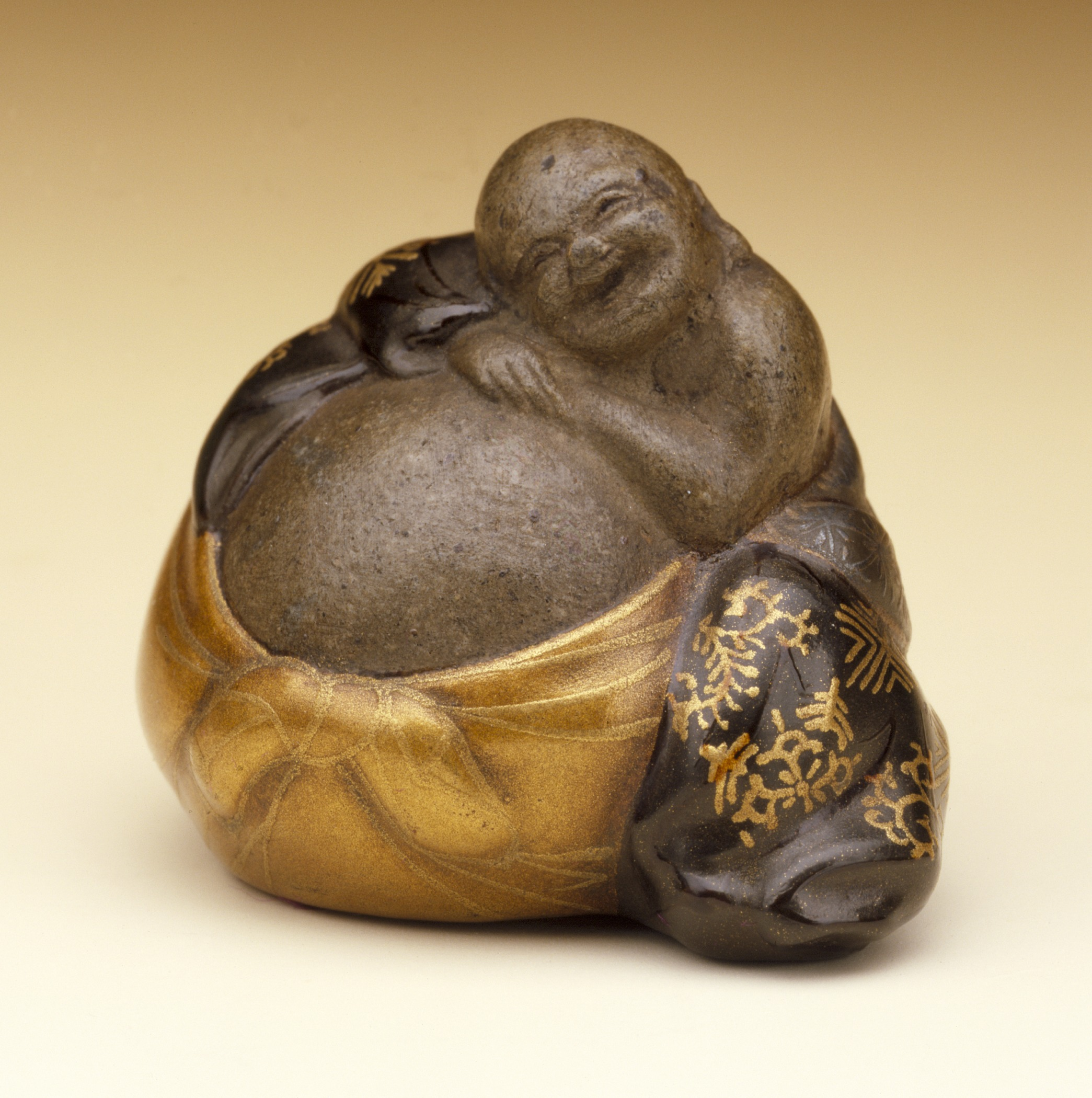
Hotei dreaming on his bag of treasures. Ceramic with gold and lacquer. Japan, mid-19th century.

== Confusion with other religious figures ==
=== Angida ===
Angida was one of the original Eighteen Arhats. According to legend, Angida was a talented Indian snake catcher whose aim was to catch venomous snakes to prevent them from biting passers-by. Angida would also remove the snake's venomous fangs and release them. Due to his kindness, he was able to attain bodhi.

In Chinese art, Angida is sometimes portrayed as Budai, being rotund, laughing, and carrying a bag.

=== Gautama Buddha ===
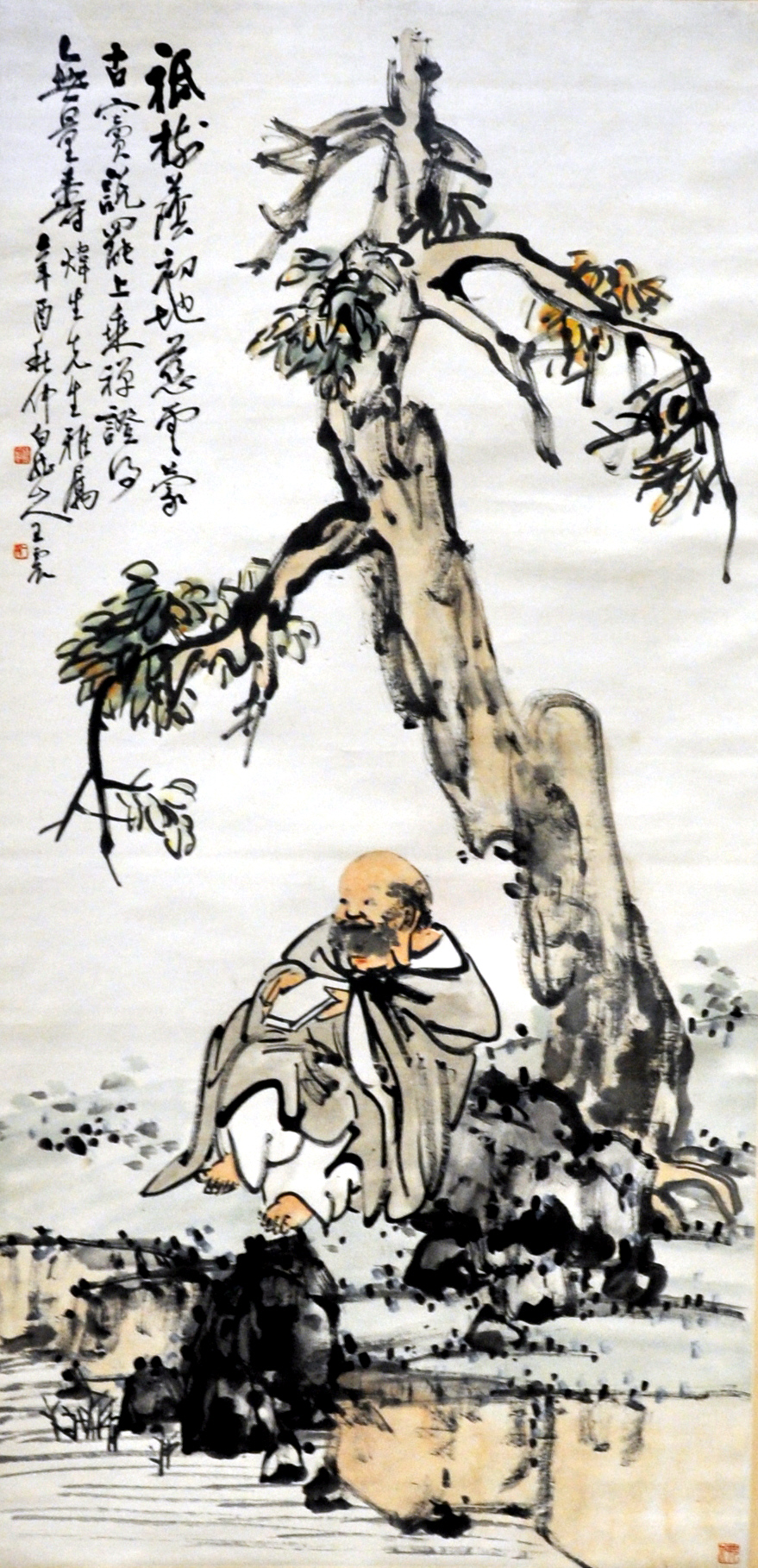
Budai under a pine tree, by Wang Zhen. 1921

In the Western world, Budai is often mistaken for Gautama Buddha himself, and thus is nicknamed the "Fat Buddha". In Chan and Zen tradition he is an incarnation of Maitreya, not Gautama Buddha.

=== Kangxi Emperor ===
In Mongolia, Budai is called Enkh Amaglan Khan, which is identical to the Mongolian name for the Kangxi Emperor. Because of this, Budai is often mistaken for the Kangxi Emperor.

=== Phra Sangkajai ===
In Thailand, Budai is sometimes confused with the arhat Kaccāyana, known in Thailand as Phra Sangkajai or Phra Sangkachai. Buddha praised Phra Sangkajai for his excellence in explaining sophisticated concepts of the dhamma in an easily and correctly understandable manner. Phra Sangkajai is also known for composing the Madhupindika Sutta.

One story from Thai folklore relates that Phra Sangkajai was so handsome that even a man once wanted him for a wife. To avoid a similar situation, Phra Sangkajai decided to transform himself into a fat monk. Another tale says he was so attractive that angels and men often compared him with the Buddha. He considered this inappropriate, so disguised himself in a fat body.

Although both Budai and Phra Sangkajai may be found in both Thai and Chinese temples, Phra Sangkajai is found more often in Thai temples, and Budai in Chinese temples. Two points to distinguish them from one another are:

1. Phra Sangkajai has a trace of hair on his head (looking similar to the Buddha's) while Budai is clearly bald.
2. Phra Sangkajai wears the robes in Theravada fashion, with the robes folded across one shoulder, leaving the other uncovered. Budai wears the robes in Chinese style, covering both arms but leaving the front part of the upper body uncovered.

== See also ==
- Buddha Shenrab
- Maitreya Buddha

== Sources ==
- Buswell, Robert E.; Lopez, Donald S. (2013). The Princeton Dictionary of Buddhism. Princeton University Press. ISBN 978-0-691-15786-3.
- Chapin, H.B. (1933). "The Chan Master Pu-tai". Journal of the American Oriental Society. 53 (1): 47–52. doi:10.2307/593188. JSTOR 593188.
- Sponberg, Alan; Hardacre, Helen, eds. (1988). Maitreya, the Future Buddha. Cambridge University Press. ISBN 978-0-521-34344-2.
