= Mokuan Reien =

Japanese painter

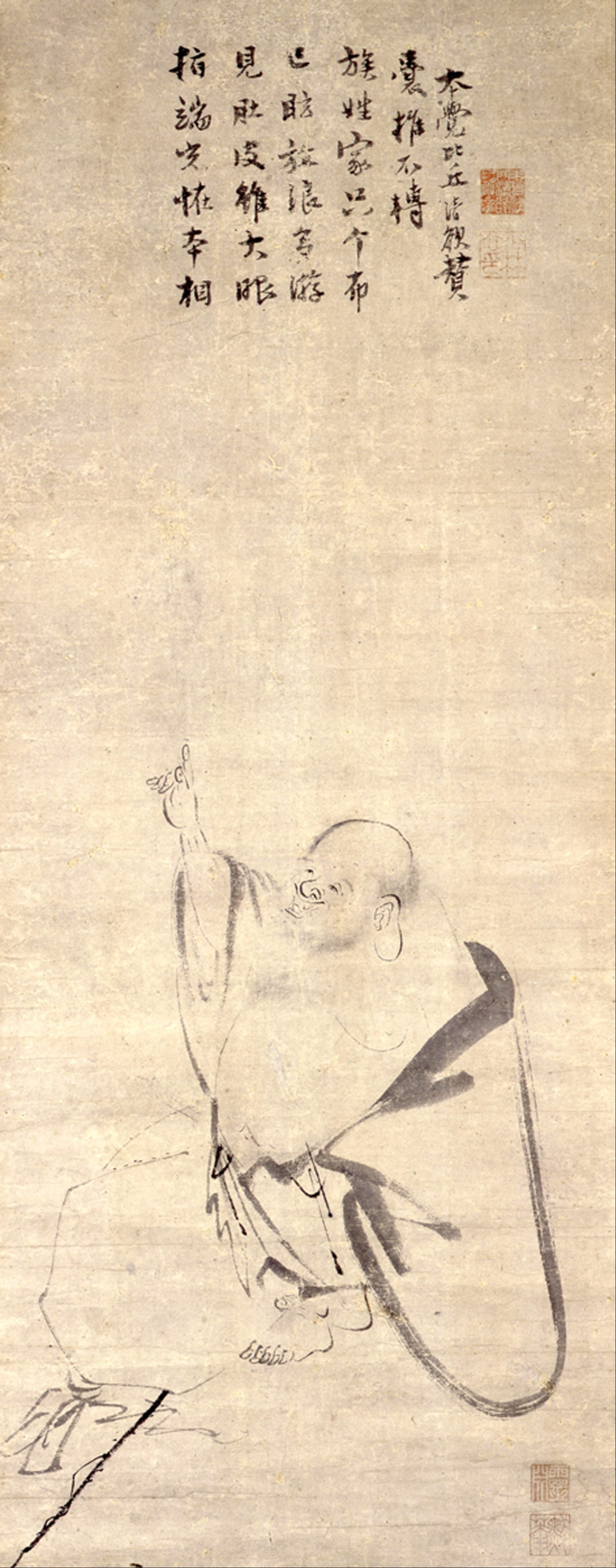
Mokuan Reien (1345) – HOTEI(BUDAI)

Mokuan Reien (黙庵) (died 1345) was a Japanese painter of the late Kamakura and early Muromachi periods who helped bring Zen painting style from China to Japan. Ordained as a priest in Kamakura before 1323, Mokuan journeyed to China about 1327 to perfect his knowledge of Zen. He lived in several different monasteries in southern China and died there about 1345. Since many of the paintings bearing the Mokuan seal also have inscriptions by Chinese Zen masters, it is thought that they were first owned by these men and brought to Japan. Therefore, he is considered one of the major artists to introduce the Chinese style suiboku (ink and wash) to Japan. During his life, Mokuan achieved a significant reputation as an artist to the point he was identified as "a second Mu Qi" one of the greatest Chinese Chan monk painters whose many works are even preserved in Japan.
