= Dinghui Temple =

Buddhist temple in Nantong, China

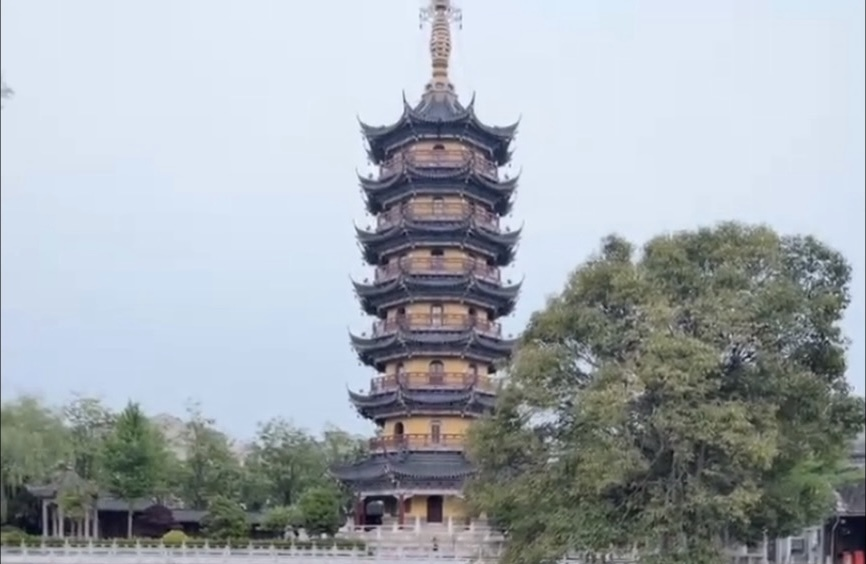
The pagoda in Dinghui Temple

Dinghui Temple (Chinese: 定慧寺; pinyin: Dìnghuì Sì) was built in 591 AD during the Sui dynasty. According to the Xugao Sengzhuan, written by a monk called Daoxuan during the Tang dynasty, the emperor Yang of Sui held a meeting involving thousands of monks in Yangzhou. During the meeting the founder of Tiantai Buddhism passed by and decided to build a temple in Rugao. He took apart many houses nearby and built the temple. An accompanying pagoda was built at the same time.

== Location ==
Dinghui Temple is at 17 on Shuguang Road in southeast Rugao.

== History ==
Dinghui Temple was seriously damaged due to a series of wars during the Song dynasty. At the time of the reign of the Jiajing emperor during the Ming Dynasty, the Yangzhou government donated 46,410 taels to the city of Rugao in order to repair the entire city since they were the victims of frequent raids by wokou ("Japanese" pirates). During the reign of the Wanli emperor, Dinghui Temple was totally rebuilt and a scripture library was added. In November 1983, the People's Government of Jiangsu Province decided to open the temple to the public. By that time, most of its heritage was ruined and its Buddha statues were heavily damaged. But by the Rugao Government's efforts, Dinghui Temple was restored to its original and many tourists now visit the temple every year.

== Temple layout ==
Dinghui Temple covers an area of 16 mu and the whole layout presents a shape like the Chinese character “回”. House churches are outer ring and temples are inside. The gate of the temple faces north, which is rare in China. Daxiong Palace and Scripture Library are both at south facing north. Now, a river surrounds the temple and makes the temple more beautiful. In Jingang Palace, there are four statues representing the Four Heavenly Kings. Virūḍhaka carries a sharp sword with angry eyes. Dhṛtarāṣṭra holds a lute looking up with pretension. Vaiśravaṇa takes an umbrella with a hideous face. Virūpākṣa seizes a dragon by his strong muscles.
