= Palacio de Galiana, Toledo =

Palace in Toledo

Palacio de Galiana
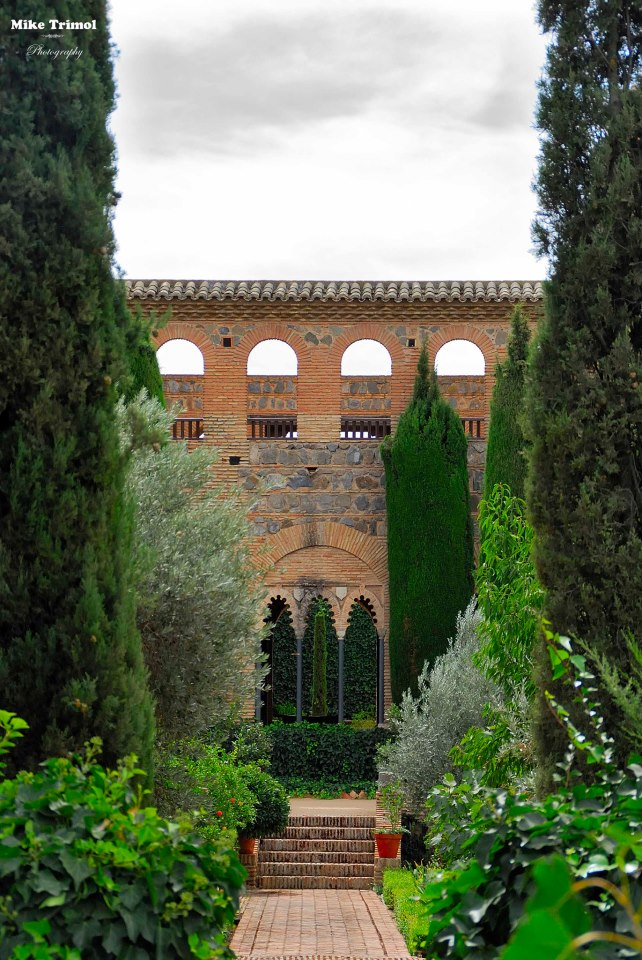
- Palacio de Galiana

- Location within Spain

General information
- Architectural style: Mudéjar architectural style
- Location: Toledo, Spain, Spain
- Coordinates: 39.8654°N 4.0051°W
- Owner: Alphonse X of Castile

The Palacio de Galiana is a Mudéjar palace in Toledo, Spain, on the borders of the Tagus River. It was built on the site of an earlier summer villa and garden of Al-Mamun, the king of the Taifa of Toledo, in the thirteenth century by king Alfonso X of Castile.

== Gardens ==
The garden area around the palace, called the 'Al-Munya al-Na‘ura' (the Water Wheel Orchard) or 'Huerta del Rey' (the king's garden) included a botanical garden of the pharmacologist Ibn al-Wafid. The garden was also, possibly, the location of a water clock, constructed by Al-Zarqali.

== 20th century ==
From the 1950s onwards the Palacio de Galiana was restored and its present garden designed by the architects Manuel Gómez Moreno and Fernando Chueca Goitía under the auspices of its owner Carmen Marañón.

== See also ==
- Generalife
- Huerta de la Alcurnia
- Spanish gardens
