= Huerta de la Alcurnia =

Moorish garden in medieval Islamic Al-Andalus

The Huerta de la Alcurnia was a Moorish garden in medieval Islamic Toledo, in Al-Andalus, present day Spain. Its name is derived from the Arabic Munya al-kudya, meaning 'garden on a higher ground.'

== Design ==
The Huerta de la Alcurnia was on the river bank between the southern city walls and the Tagus River. The garden had a pavilion for Al-Mamun, the king of the Taifa of Toledo.

== See also ==
- Palacio de Galiana
- Spanish gardens
- Category:Garden design history of Spain
