= Generalife =

Palace in Granada, Spain

Coordinates: 37°10′37″N 3°35′07″W

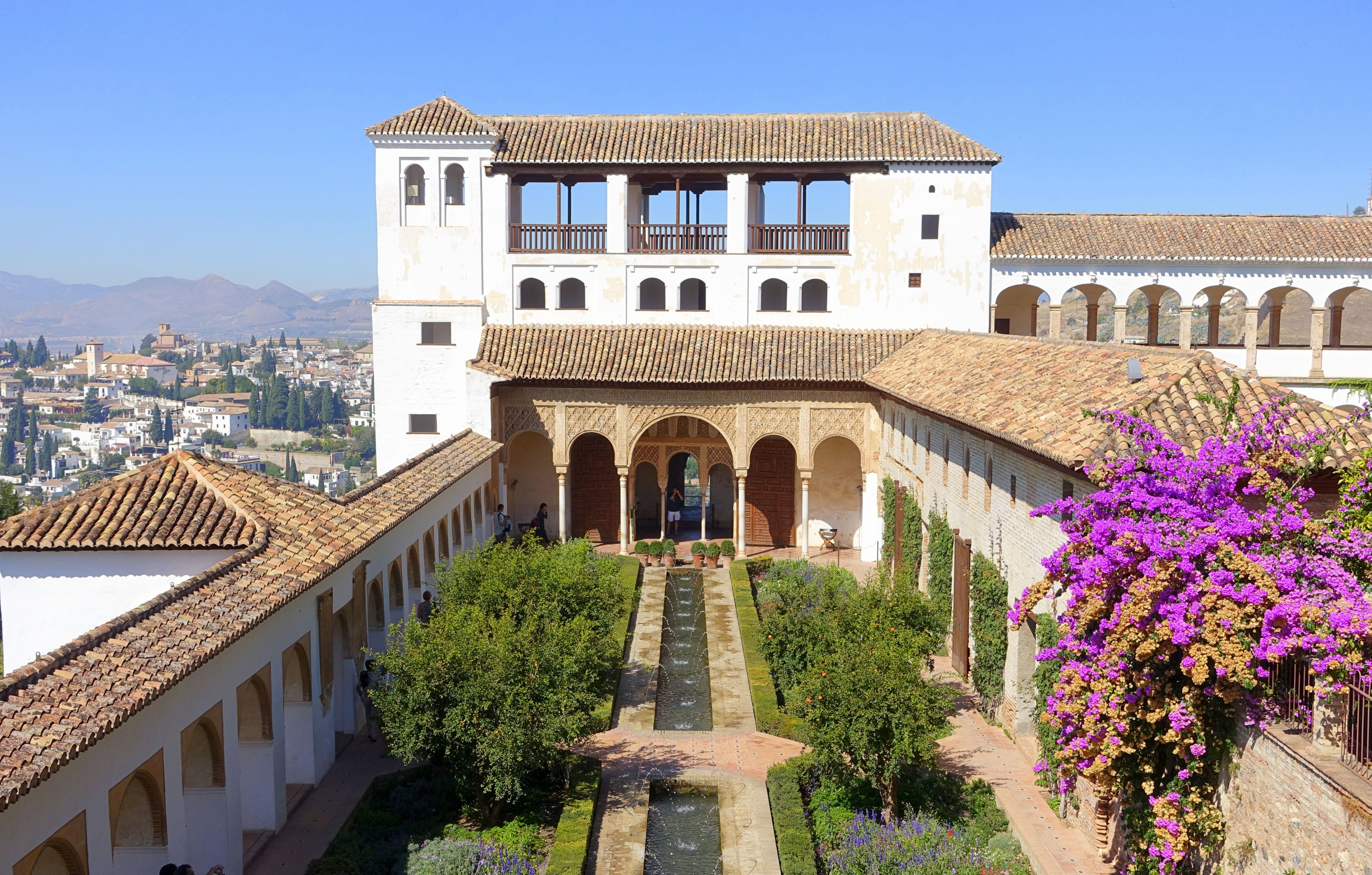
- The Patio de la Acequia
- Interactive map of Generalife
- Location: Granada, Andalucía, Spain

History
- Built: 14th century

Site notes
- Governing body: Ministry of Culture

UNESCO World Heritage Site
- Official name: Alhambra, Generalife and Albayzín, Granada
- Type: Cultural
- Criteria: i, iii, iv
- Designated: 1984 (8th session); 1994 (18th session – Extension)
- Reference no.: 314
- Region: Europe

The Generalife (Spanish pronunciation: [xe.ne.ɾa.ˈli.fe]; Arabic: جَنَّة الْعَرِيف, romanized: Jannat al-‘Arīf) was a summer palace and country estate of the Nasrid rulers of the Emirate of Granada in Al-Andalus. It is located directly east of and uphill from the Alhambra palace complex in Granada, Spain.

== Etymology ==
The most commonly cited etymology for the name "Generalife" is that it derives from jannat al-‘arīf (Arabic: جَنَّة الْعَرِيف) which may variously mean "Garden of the Architect", "Garden of the Artist", "Garden of the Gnostic", or even "Garden of the Flautist". According to Robert Irwin, however, this traditional etymology is unlikely and the true origin of the name is not clearly known. An earlier version of the name recorded in the 16th century by Marmol was Ginalarife, which J.D. Latham suggests is evidence that the first word was originally jinan (Arabic: جِنَاْن; a plural version derived from the same root), not jannat.

The original name of the Generalife may have simply been the equivalent of "Principal Orchard". An ornamental inscription by Ibn al-Yayyab inside the palace names it as the Dar al-Mamlakat as-Sa'ida ("House of the Felicitous Kingdom").

== History ==
=== Nasrid period ===
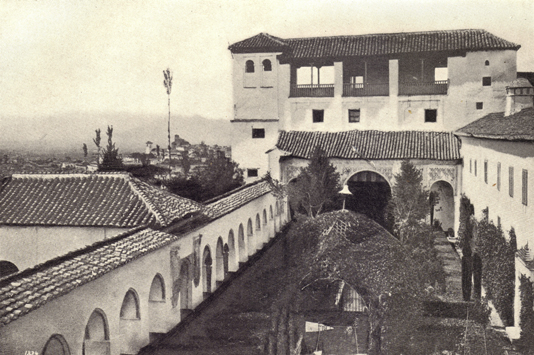
The Patio de la Acequia in the 19th century, before the installation of modern fountains

In the Nasrid period, the Generalife was an almunia (from Arabic al-munya, meaning "farm"), a country villa that was used both as a private retreat by elites as well as a farming estate with agricultural functions. The creation of such rural estates and gardens by rulers and elites in al-Andalus dated back to the Umayyad period (8th–10th centuries). Such estates are also found in some historic cities of North Africa, such as the Agdal Gardens of Marrakesh, which have survived to the present day. Their existence in Granada is recorded as early as the Zirid period (11th century). Other Nasrid-period examples of this type were located on the nearby mountainside, such as the Alijares Palace and the Dar al-'Arusa (both probably from the 14th century), as well as in other parts of Granada, such as the Alcázar Genil and the Cuarto Real de Santo Domingo (both from the 13th century, the former being originally an Almohad construction).

Based on the oldest decorations studied in the palace, the Generalife was most likely constructed by Muhammad II (r. 1273–1302) at the end of the 13th century, or possibly by Muhammad III (r. 1302–1309) at the beginning of the 14th century. Even if he did not begin its construction, Muhammad III at least contributed to some of its early decoration and he was responsible for adding the mirador chamber in the palace's northern pavilion. Later Nasrid rulers carried out their own works on it in turn. According to an inscription, it was remodelled and redecorated soon after by Isma'il I in 1319. Several inscriptions around the entrance to the Salón Regio were composed by Ibn al-Jayyab, Isma'il's vizier and court poet. There is evidence that Muhammad V (ruled 1354–1359 and 1362–1391), who carried out extensive construction inside the Alhambra, also carried out works here. Lastly, Yusuf III (r. 1408–1417) remodelled the southern sections of the palace in the 15th century.

=== After the Reconquista ===
After the end of the Reconquista and the beginning of Spanish Christian rule in Granada, the Generalife underwent various changes and additions from the 16th century up the 20th century. Among other changes, the Catholic Monarchs added an upper story to the northern pavilion of the Patio de la Acequia ("Courtyard of the Water Canal") in 1494 while the adjacent Patio de la Sultana ("Courtyard of the Sultana") was completely redesigned in the 16th century. Venetian traveler Andrea Navagero visited the Generalife in 1524–26, providing a description of it before the majority of subsequent Spanish modifications had taken place which has been useful to modern scholars in reconstructing the original appearance of the palace and its gardens.

Théophile Gautier, a mid-19th century visitor, complained that:

Of the Generalife nothing now remains but some arcades and some large panels of arabesques, unfortunately plastered over with layers of whitewash that have been applied again and again with all the obstinacy of a dispiriting cleanliness. Little by little the delicate sculptures and the marvellous guilloches of this fairy-like architecture have been obliterated, filled up, and engulfed. What is at present nothing more than a faintly-vermiculated wall, was formerly open lace-work as fine as those ivory leaves which the patience of the Chinese carves for fans.

The present-day look of the gardens, in particular the Jardines Nuevos ("New Gardens"), is in large part due to Leopoldo Torres Balbás and Francisco Prieto Moreno, who rearranged much of it between 1931 and 1951 and imparted Italian influences on their design. In 1958 a major fire destroyed or damaged much of the northern sections of the Generalife. However, the damage from the fire and the subsequent repairs that were undertaken also allowed for significant excavations to document the original form of the gardens. In the Patio de la Acequia archeologists discovered the original Nasrid-era paved paths and managed to identify the original soil of the Moorish gardens buried under 70 centimeters of newer layers, as well as outlet holes along the sides of the central canal which enabled the gardens to be watered and irrigated. After the excavations, however, this original layer of paths and gardens was covered up again by half a meter of new material, the outlet holes were sealed, and modern gardens were replanted with flora that had no botanical relation to the original Moorish gardens. The overall layout and divisions of the space, however, still preserve the original arrangement. More recent restorations of the gardens were more closely based on an analysis of the garden's original flora.

Since 1984 the Generalife has been a UNESCO World Heritage Site along with the Alhambra.

== Description ==
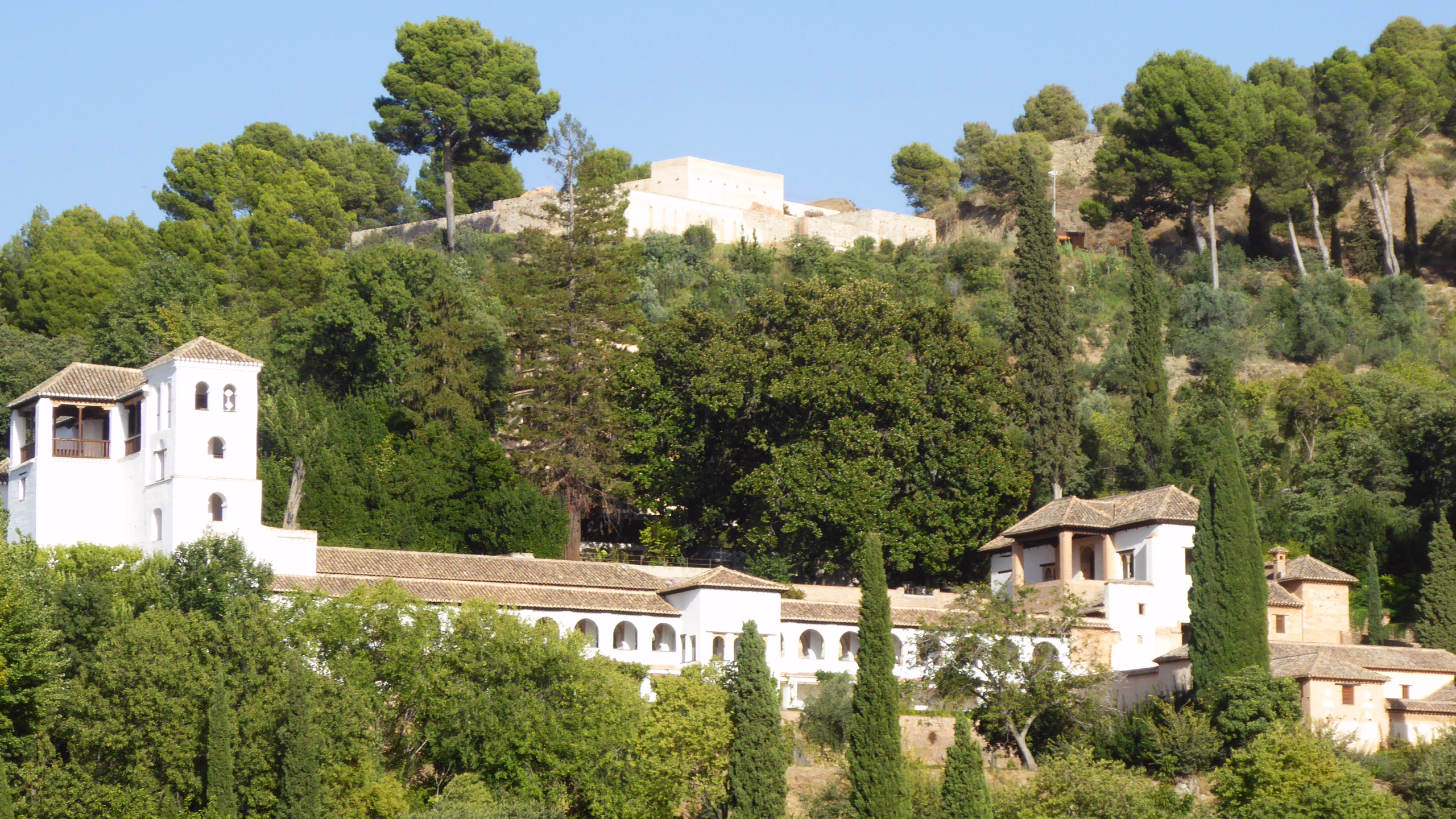
Generalife (below), with the Silla del Moro visible (above), on the Sabika hill

=== The present-day site ===
The Generalife today includes a mix of original Nasrid-period elements as well as extensive modern elements (especially in the appearance of the gardens). The walkways are paved in traditional Granadian style with a mosaic of pebbles: white ones from the River Darro and black ones from the River Genil.

==== The outer gardens ====
The Generalife gardens occupy three large terraces on the hillside, each measuring about 35 metres (115 ft) wide by 250 metres (820 ft) long. The two lower terraces, on the southwest side, are occupied by market gardens and orchards. Known today as Las Huertas, these gardens have served this purpose since the 14th century. The highest terrace is occupied by the Jardines Nuevos ("New Gardens"), a series of 20th-century gardens that form the main approach to the historic palaces today. The southern part of this garden area was designed by Francisco Prieto Moreno and finished in 1951. It includes walls formed by trimmed cypress trees and a large cruciform pool inspired by Islamic/Moorish gardens, along with other decorative plants. An open-air theatre was also added here in 1952. The northern part of the gardens, which features a rose bush labyrinth, was designed by Leopoldo Torres Balbás in 1931.

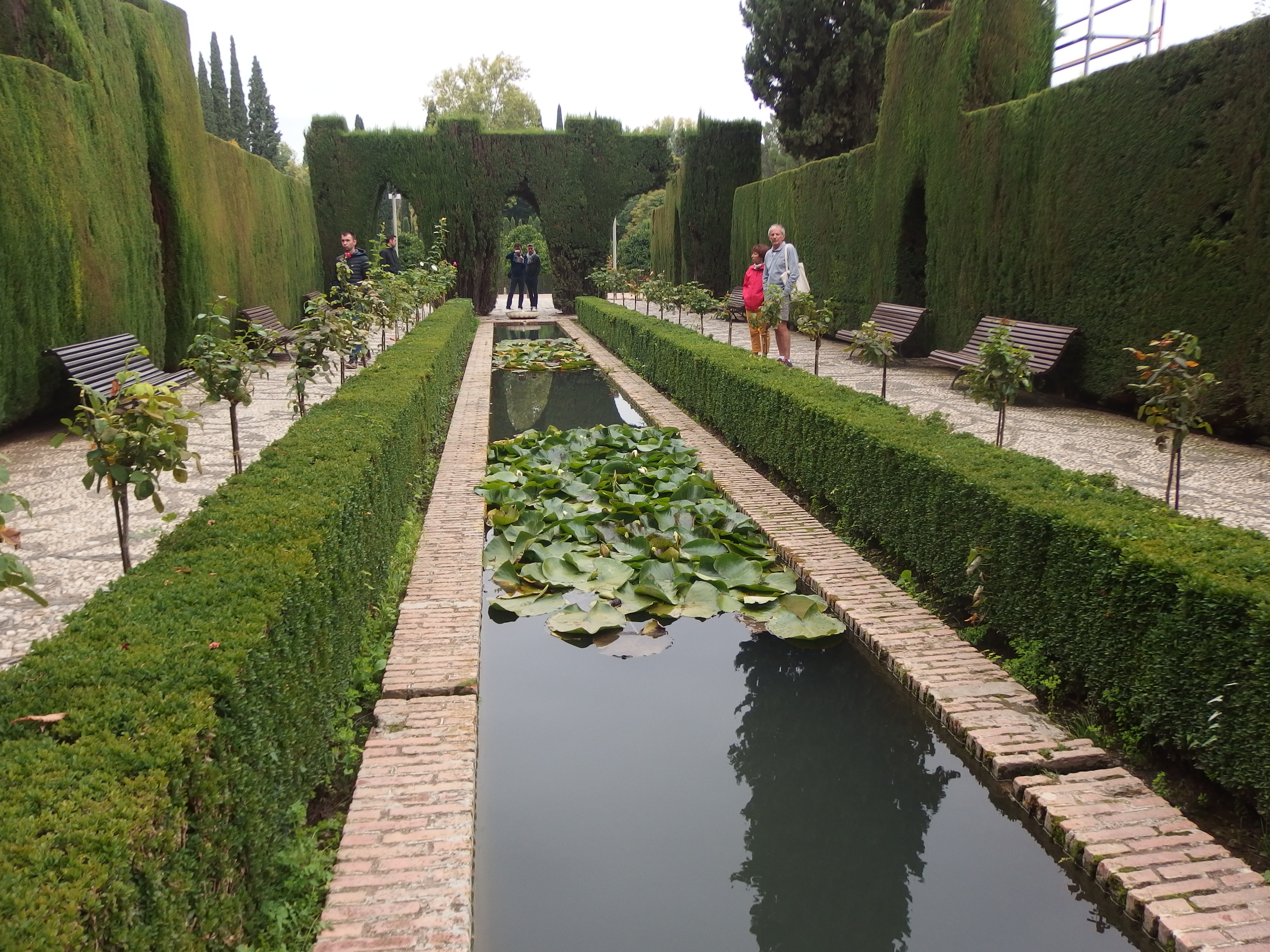
The 20th-century Jardines Nuevos (New Gardens)

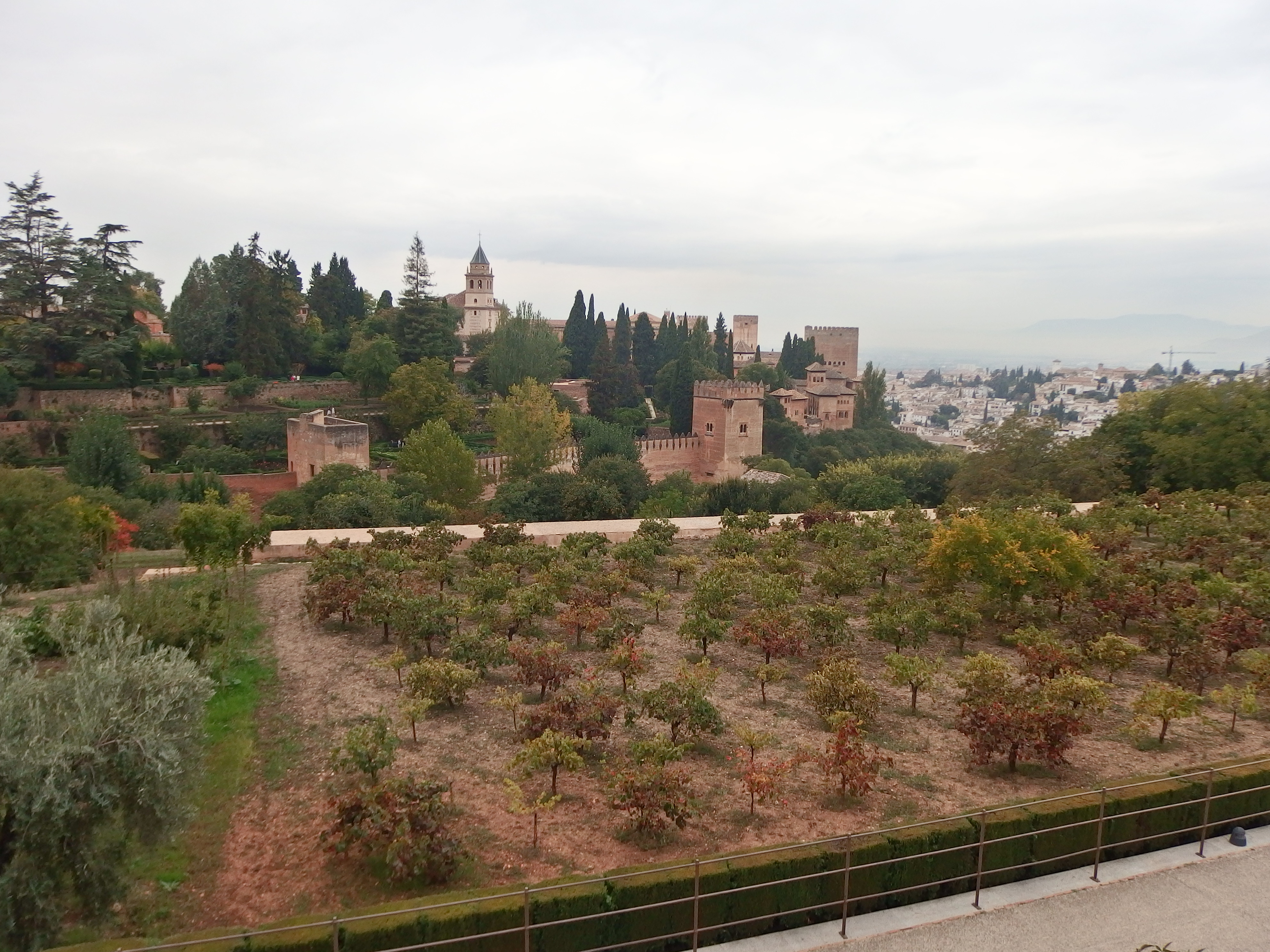
Las Huertas, the market gardens on the terraced hillside below the Generalife

==== The main palace ====
The Generalife Palace itself stands on a fourth terrace above and north of the outer gardens. Several smaller garden terraces also climb the hillside above this, with some auxiliary buildings are located. The core of the palace complex is centered on the Patio de la Acequia ("Courtyard of the Water Canal"), the largest structure. The courtyard is about four times as long as it is wide, measuring 12.8 by 48.7 metres (42 by 160 ft). It is entered via a smaller courtyard, the Patio de Polo, on its south side, which in turn is accessed through another minor courtyard, known as the Dismounting Courtyard. The word acequia is derived from the Arabic word al-saqiya, meaning a water canal or water supply. The building is arranged around a long interior courtyard, occupied by a garden which is split into four equal elongated flowerbeds. This type of garden with a four-part division has its historical roots in the Persian chahar bagh-type gardens, a model which spread westward across the Islamic world and is also found in the various riyad gardens of Al-Andalus and the Maghreb. Between these, along the courtyard's long axis, runs a water channel or pool lined on either side with water jets spouting water across the pool. On the courtyard's short axis is a paved path. At the middle of this path, in the axial center of the courtyard, is a paved platform, which originally would have had its own central fountain. Today, two fountains, consisting of a low round water basin with a central spout, are located at the north and south ends of the water channel. Aligned with the middle of the courtyard is also a small belvedere or mirador (lookout) chamber that projects outward from the western wall of the garden. The square chamber measures 3.98 metres (13.1 ft) per side and its interior is decorated with carved stucco. This is probably the earliest known mirador in Nasrid architecture, establishing a feature that appeared in many subsequent palaces.

The Patio de la Acequia is framed by pavilion-like structures at its north and south ends. To the south, the Pabellón Sur ("South Pavilion") is a two-floor structure with a portico fronting its courtyard side and is less well-preserved than the north pavilion. The north pavilion was originally called Majlis al-Akbari (meaning roughly "the Main Hall") or Majlis al-'As'adi ("the Fortunate Hall") in Arabic. is preceded by a portico of five arches with a larger central arch. The arches feature richly-carved stucco decoration with a sebka motif and bands of cursive Arabic inscriptions. Behind the arches is a roofed gallery space covered by a wooden ceiling of octagonal coffers. This gallery leads to another chamber, known as the Salón Regio (Royal Chamber), via a stucco-decorated entrance of three arches. The chamber is covered by another wooden ceiling. The arches and upper walls in the chamber are covered with more stucco decoration, including an upper frieze of muqarnas (or mocárabes) sculpting. At the middle of the northern side of the chamber is a tower incorporating a mirador chamber with more intricate stucco decoration. This mirador provides views of the Albaicín from windows on three sides.

Directly above Patio de la Acequia, on its northeast side, is the Patio de la Sultana or Patio del Ciprés de la Sultana ("Courtyard of the Sultana" or "Courtyard of the Cypresses of the Sultana"). Occupied by pools, gardens, and paved paths, this courtyard's current design and construction date from after the Nasrid period. The arcaded structure on its north side was built between 1584 and 1586.

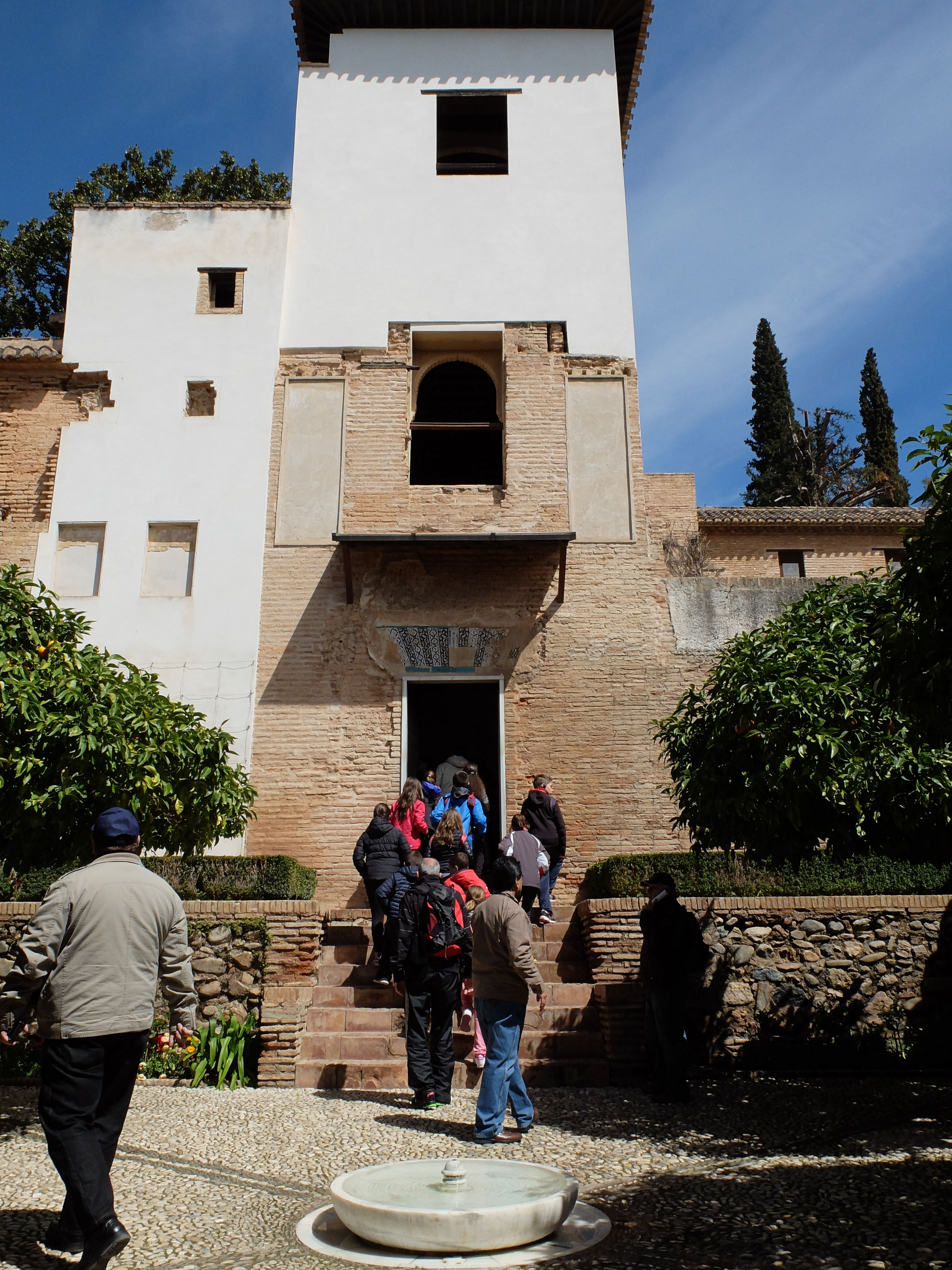
Entrance to the Generalife Palace through the Patio de Polo

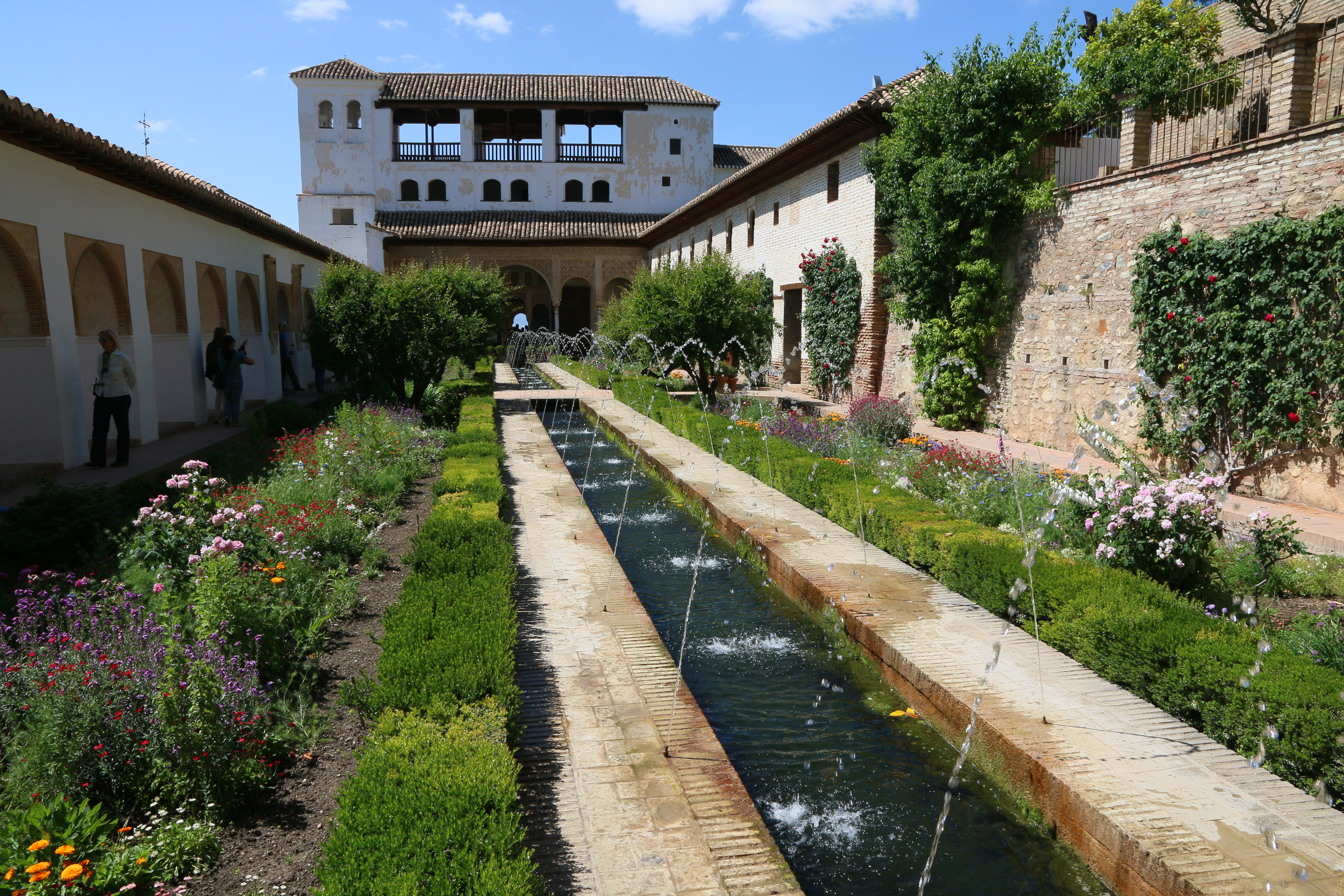
The Patio de la Acequia (Courtyard of the Canal), looking north

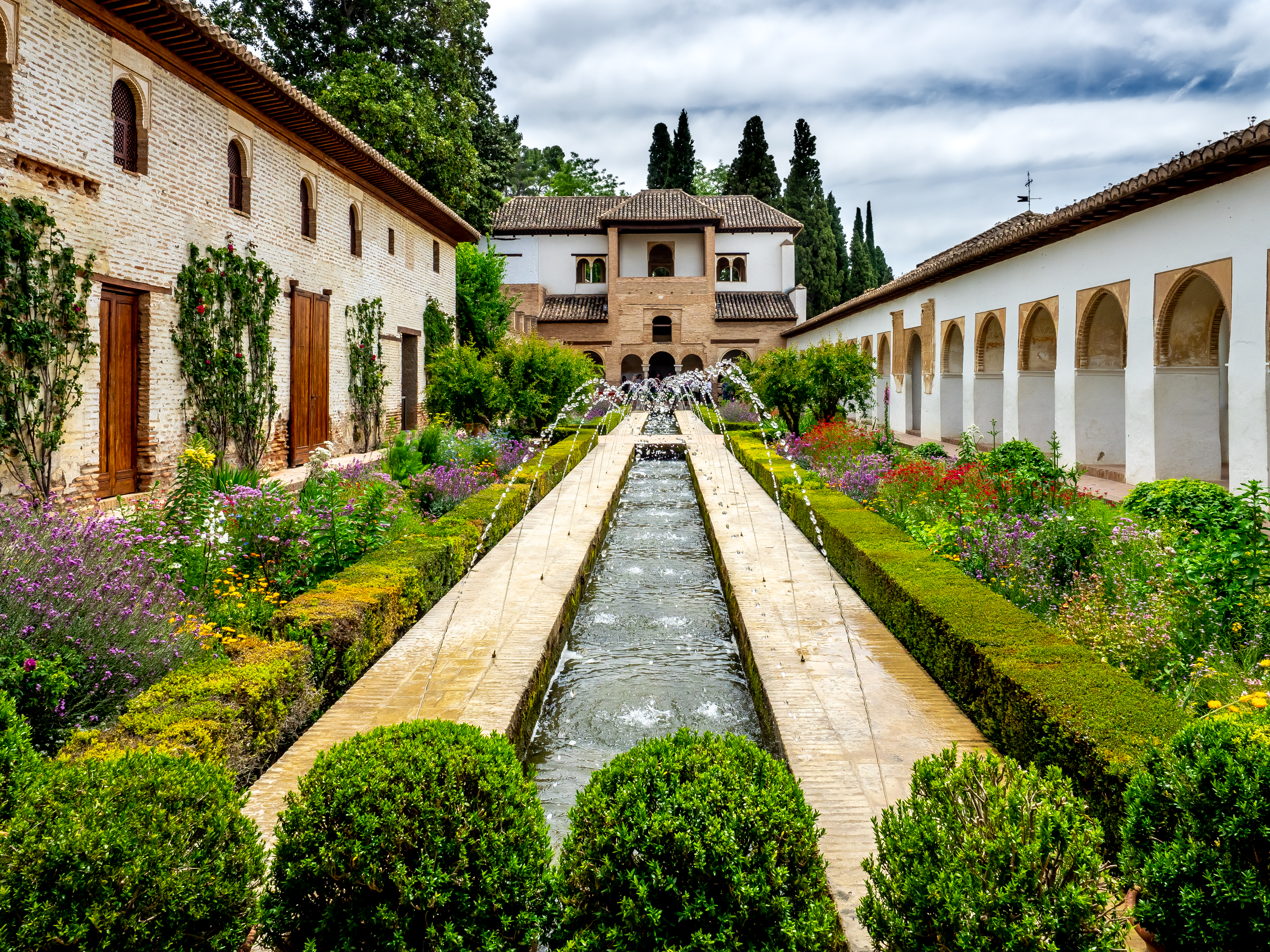
Patio de la Acequia, looking south to the Pabellón Sur

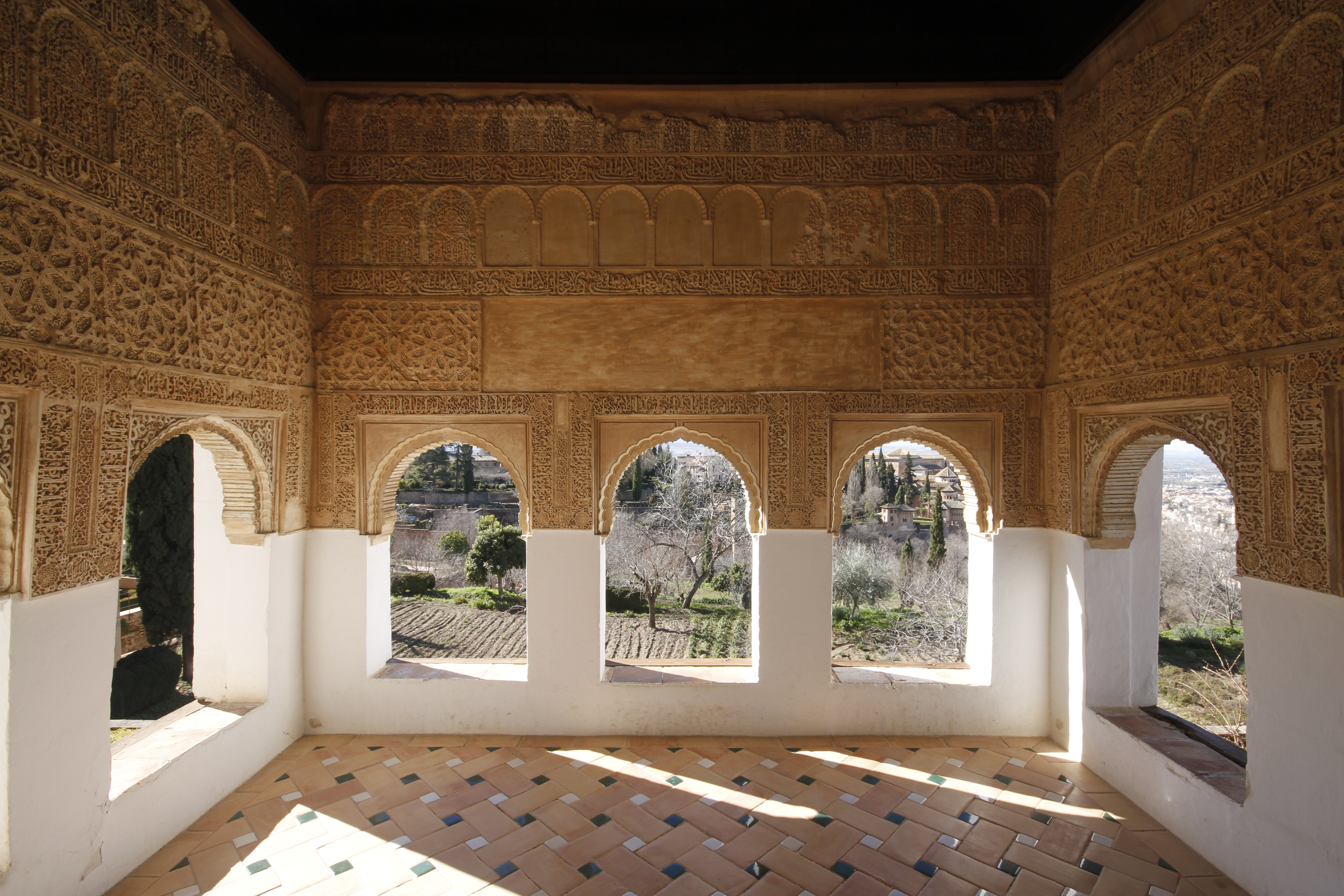
Interior of the mirador (lookout) of the courtyard at its western side

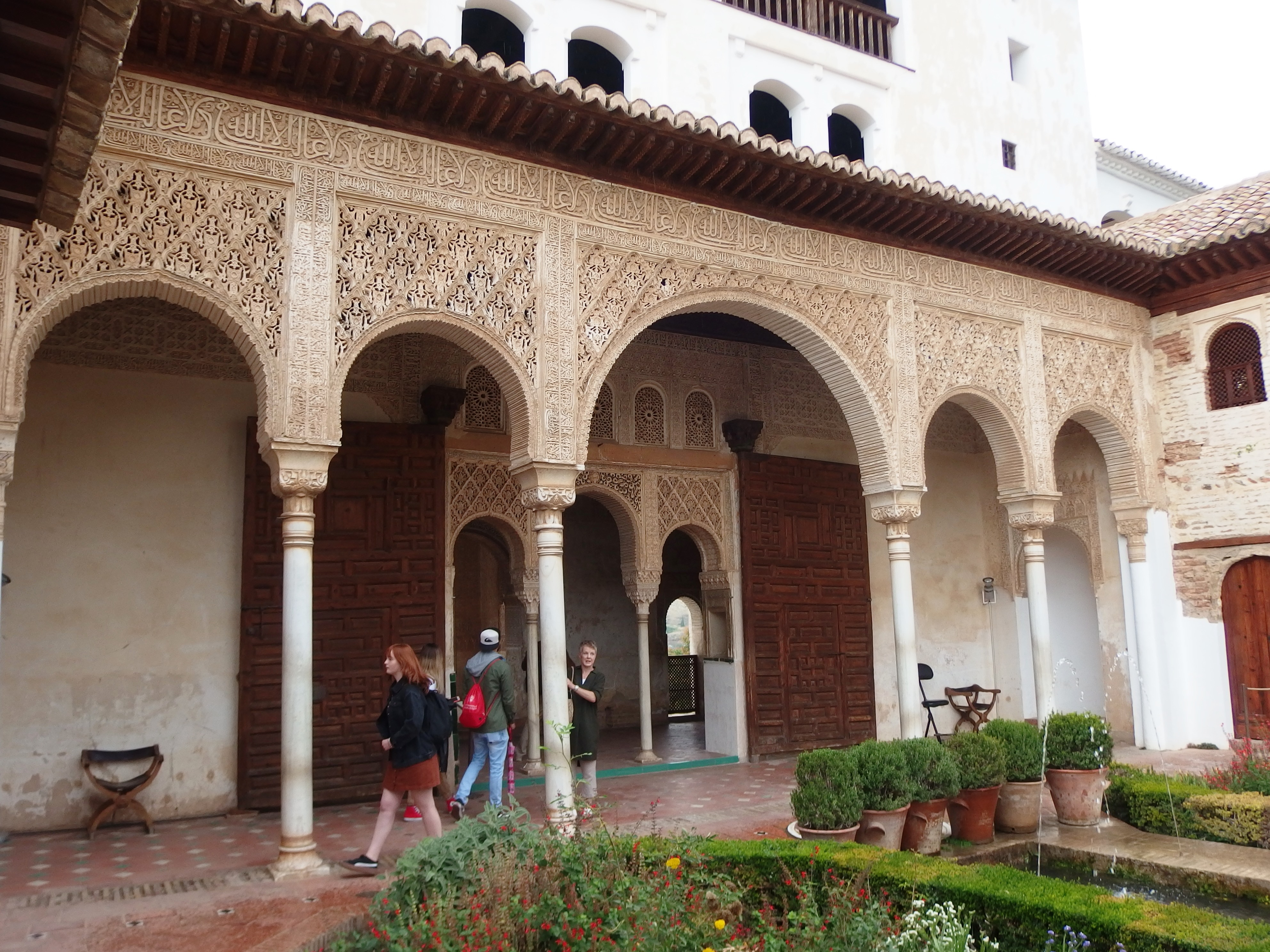
The northern portico of the Patio de la Acequia, leading to the Salón Regio

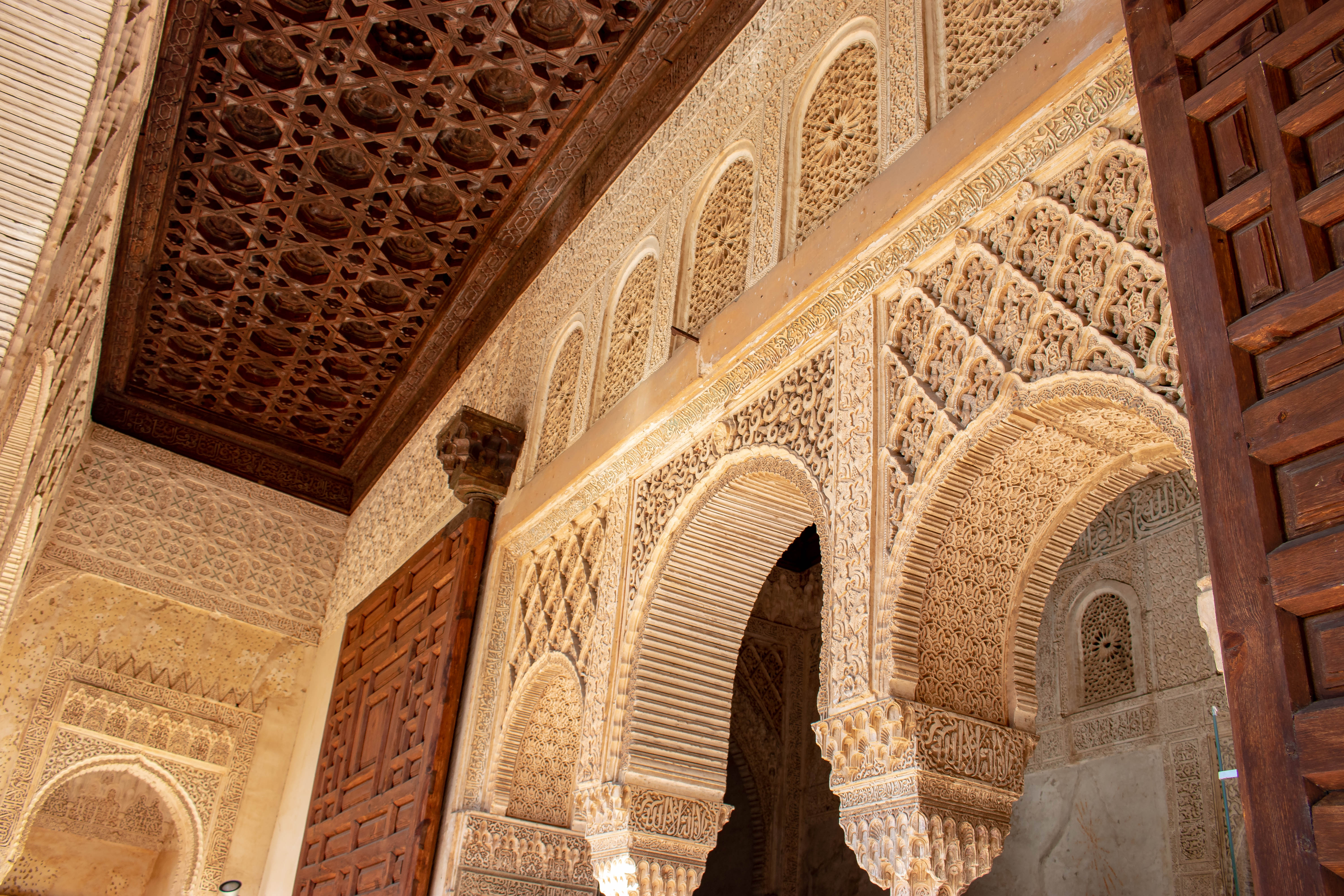
The entrance gallery to the Salón Regio (Royal Chamber)

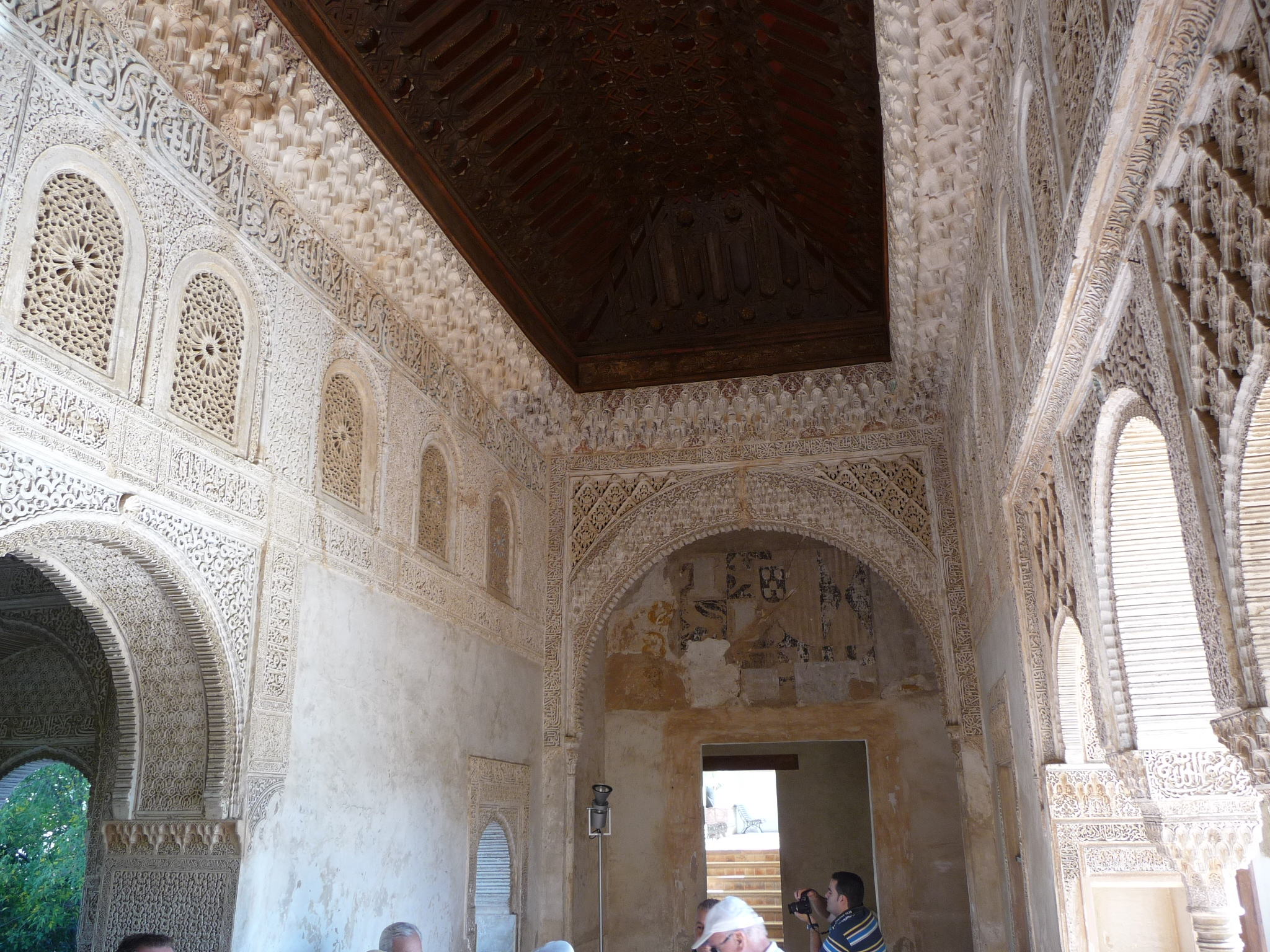
Interior of the Salón Regio (Royal Chamber)

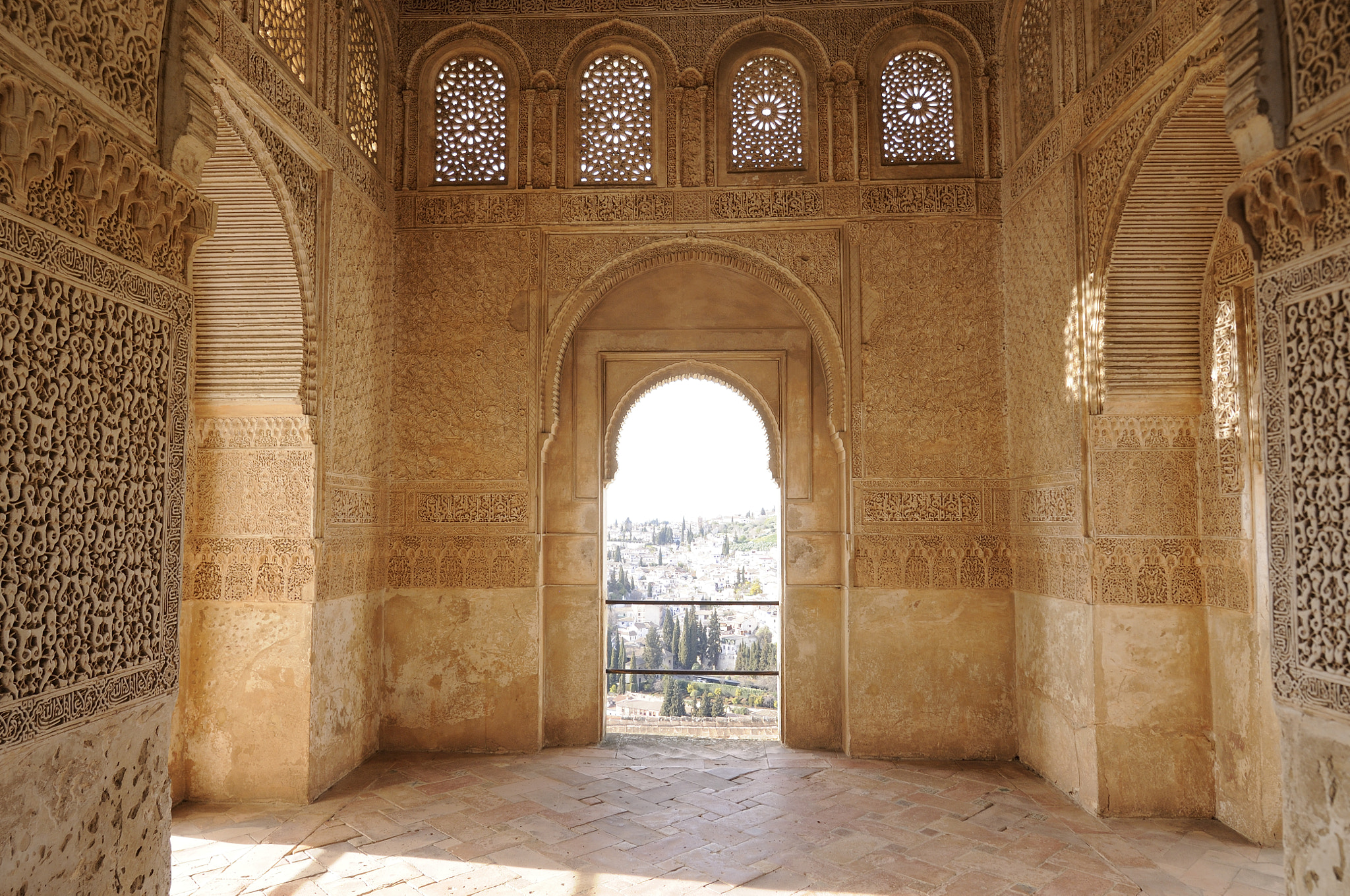
Interior of the mirador (lookout) on the north side of the Salón Regio

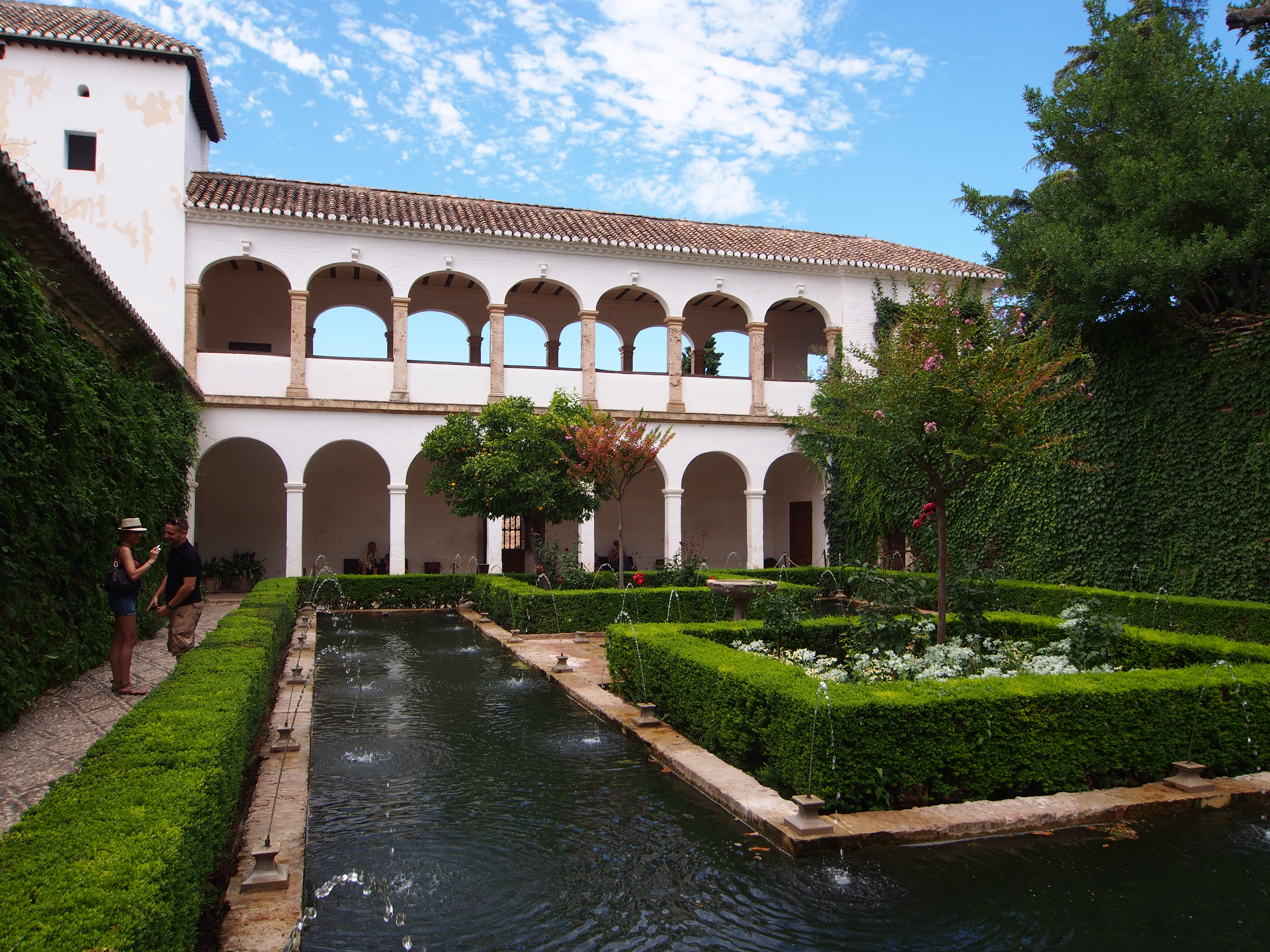
The Patio de la Sultana (Courtyard of the Sultana), looking north

==== The Water Stairway and the upper gardens ====
Above the Patio de la Sultana in turn is the celebrated Water Stairway or Escalera del Agua, a four-flight staircase whose balustrades on either side are carved with water channels that run along their top and along the entire length of the staircase. The flights of the stairway are interrupted by small circular terraces or landings at the middle of which are fountains. At the top of the stairway is a small 19th century pavilion known as the Romantic Pavilion (Pabellón Romántico). Next to the Stairway and to the Patio de la Sultana are the High Gardens or Jardines Altos, arranged across several terraces climbing up the hillside. At the southeast end of the gardens and of the main palace structure is the Paseo de las Adelfas ("Walk of the Oleanders"), which today is the path used by visitors to exit the Generalife.

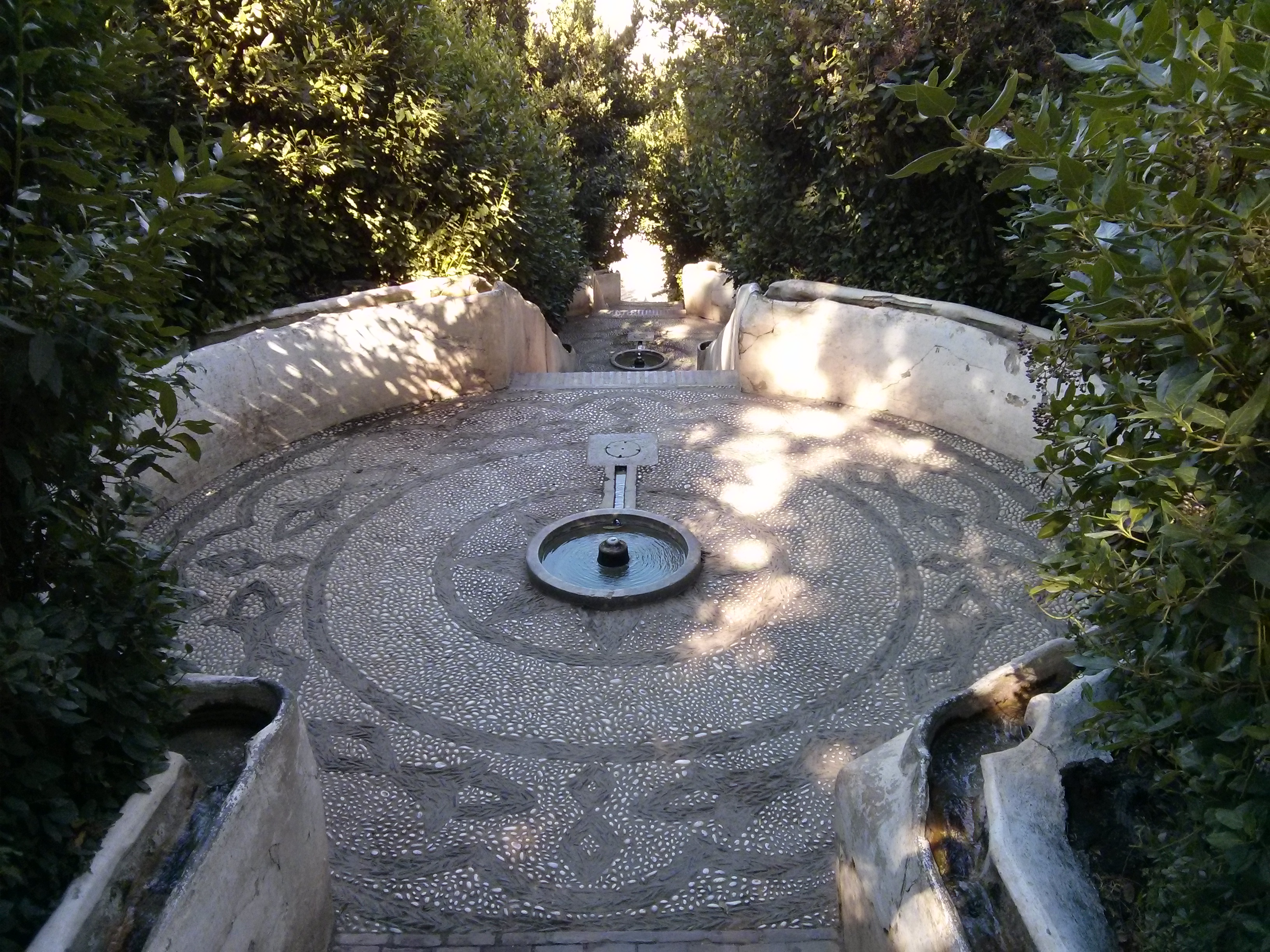
The Water Stairway or Escalera del Agua

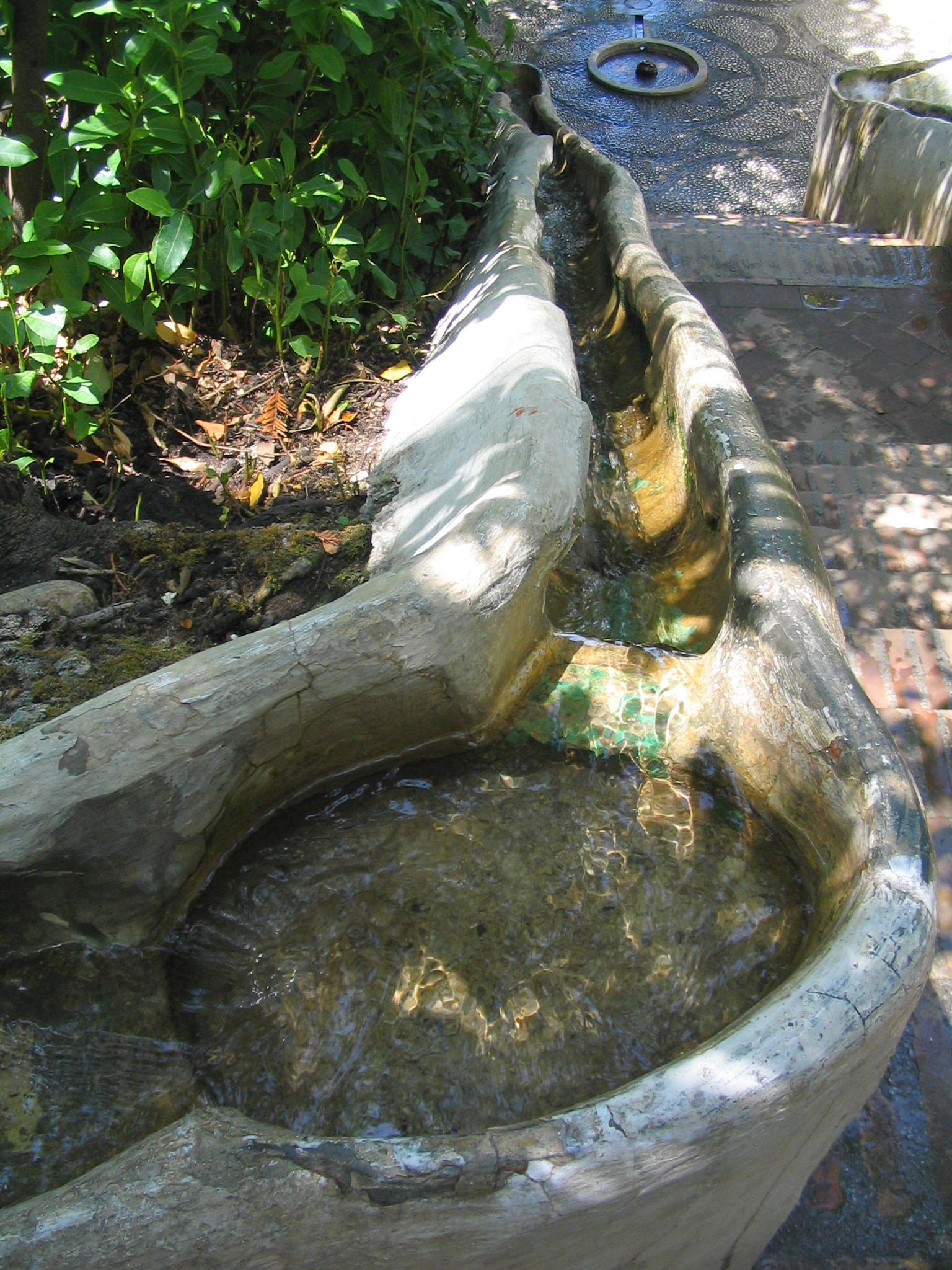
The water channels running on top of the balustrades of the Water Stairway

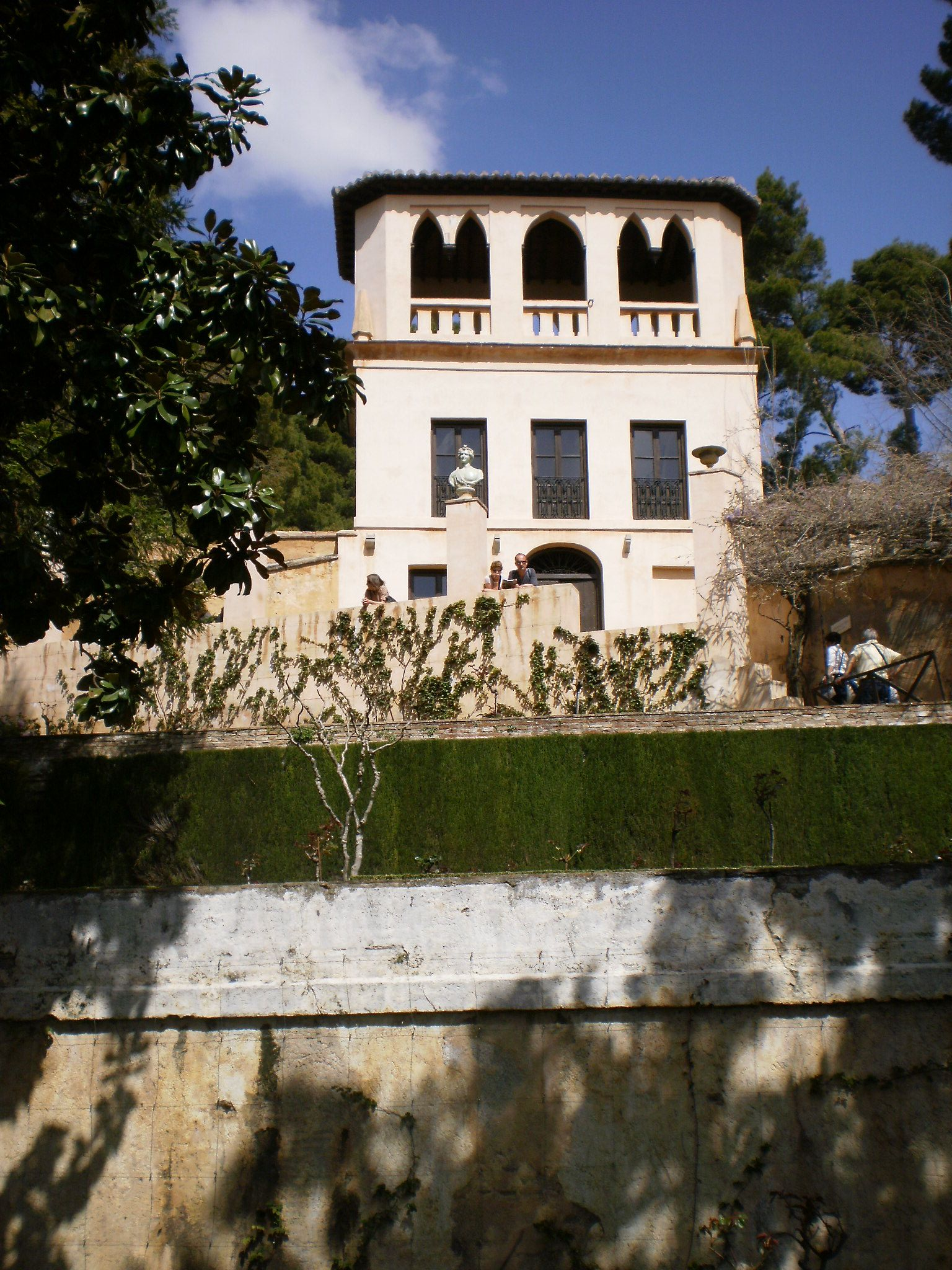
The Romantic Pavilion (Pabellón Romántico), built in 1836 on the probable site of the former Muslim prayer hall

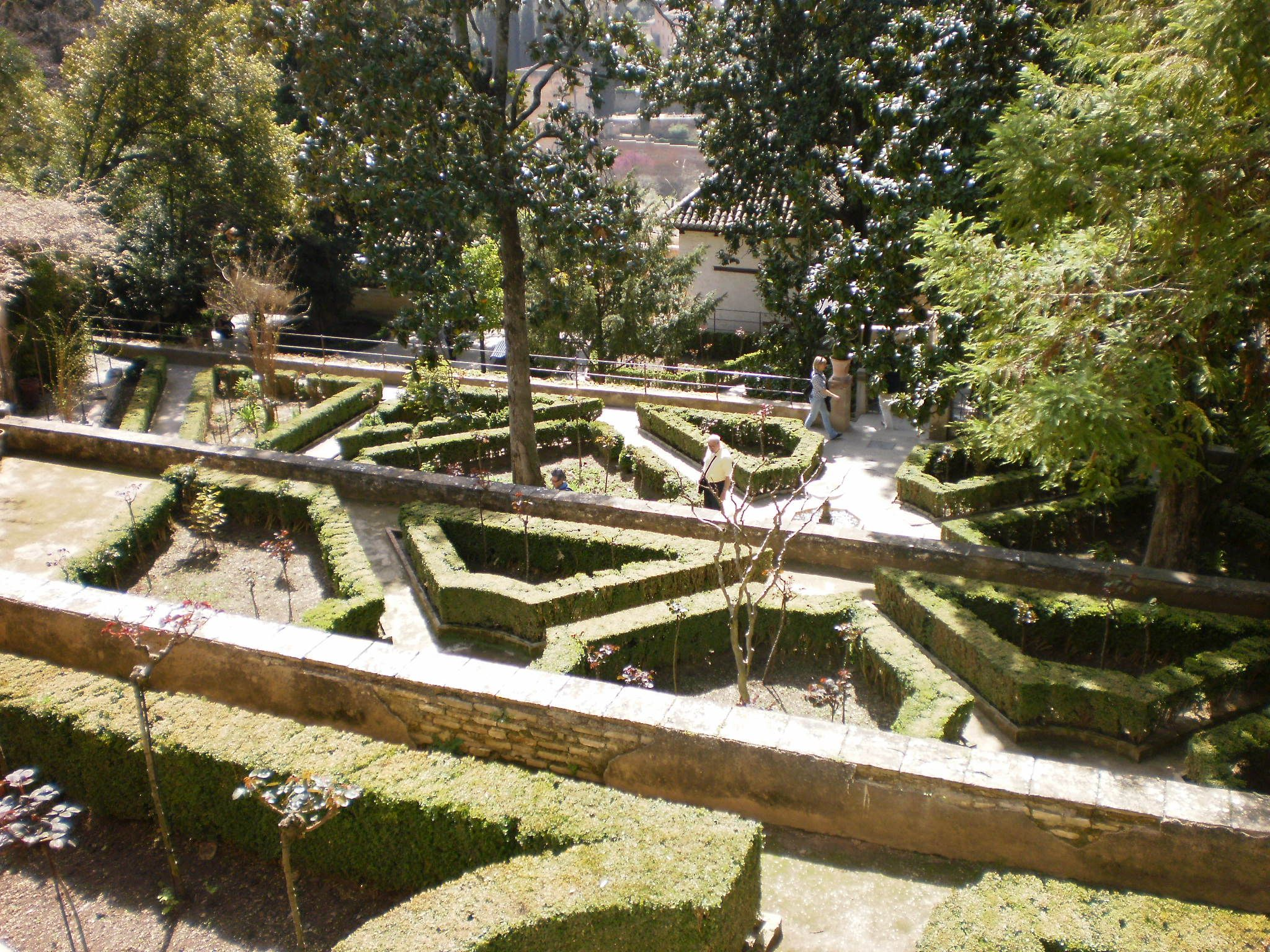
The Jardines Altos (High Gardens)

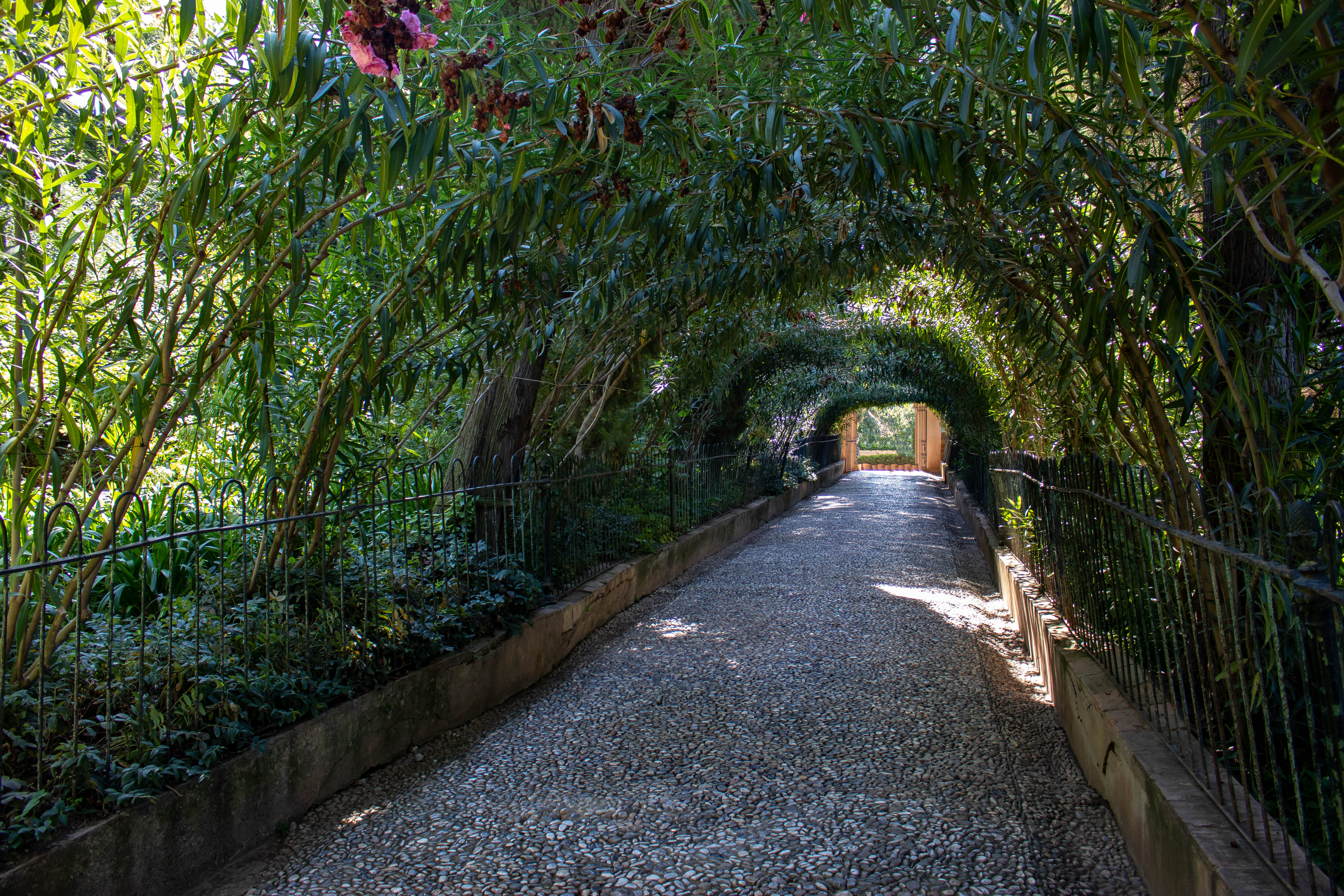
The Paseo de las Adelfas (Walk of the Oleanders)

=== Original form under Nasrid rule ===
==== Overall layout ====
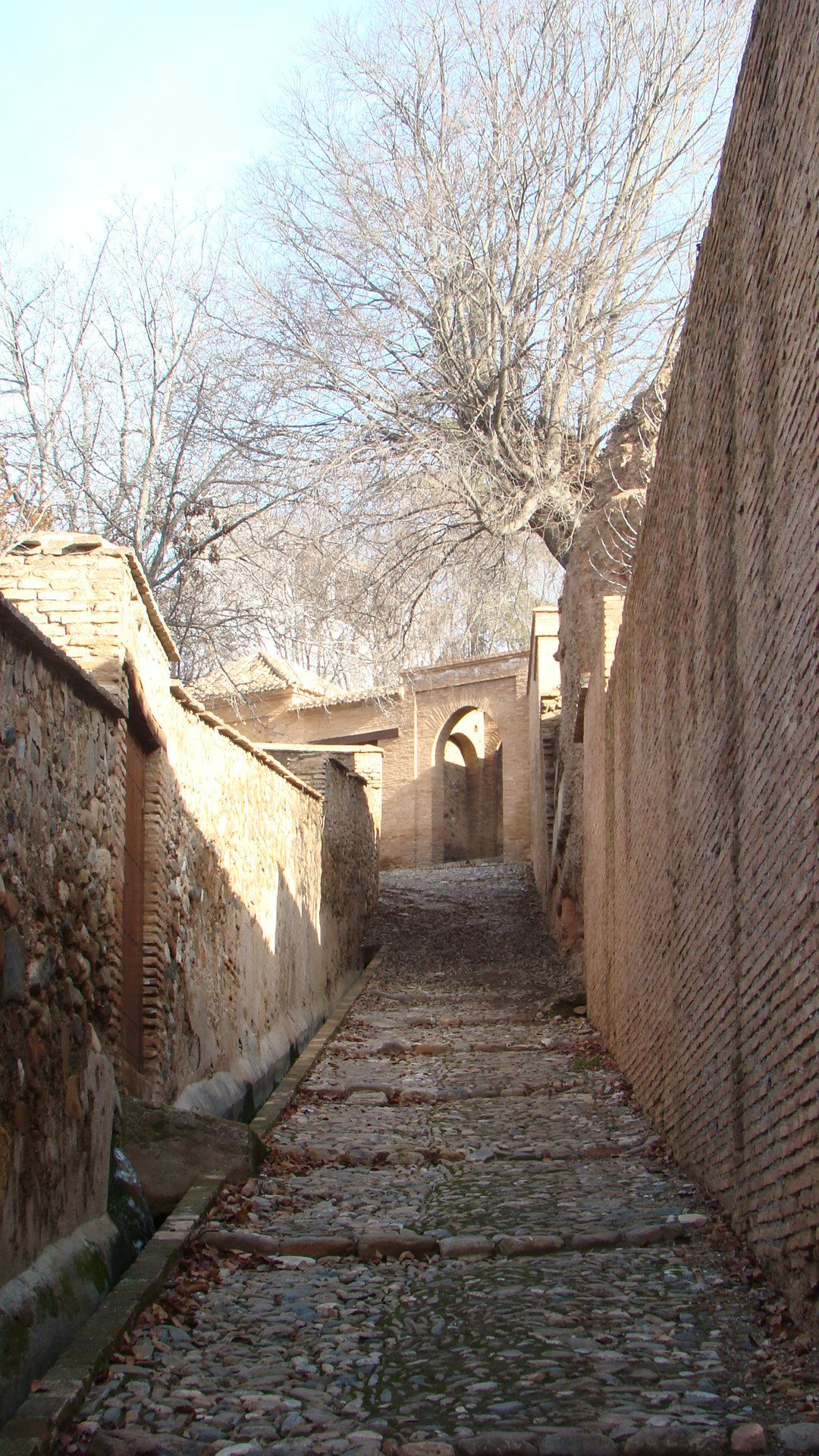
The private medieval passage between the Alhambra and the Generalife

The palace and the gardens were originally used as a private retreat and summer palace for the Nasrid rulers and their family, away from the official business that took place in the Alhambra. The grounds were originally enclosed by a long wall, no longer present. In this regard, it was similar in function to other such royal countryside estates that had existed as far back as the early Umayyad emirate (8th-10th centuries) of Cordoba. Much like these other garden estates, it is likely that large parts of the Generalife's grounds would also have been used as orchards, as pasturage for horses, and as kitchen gardens for ingredients. Indeed, one major function of the Generalife's gardens was agricultural production. Two other separate palaces were also built on the same hillside nearby during the Nasrid period: the Alijares Palace and the Dar al-'Arusa, although they were located further east and little remains of them today. The Silla del Moro (the "Seat of the Moor"), a ruined structure today on the hilltop overlooking the Generalife, was once a fort and monitoring post that protected the water supply infrastructure in this area.

Although a main entrance existed for visitors at the southern end of the grounds, the Nasrid rulers could reach the Generalife palace directly from the Alhambra through a private covered passage, partly sunken and hidden between walls, that crossed the ravine between them. This passage, which still mostly exists today, began at the Torre de los Picos on the Alhambra side and crossed the orchards and market gardens until it reached the Generalife Palace through a group of fortified towers at the palace's southwestern end, granting direct entry into what is now the Patio de Polo. Roughly halfway along this passage was a small irregular courtyard with a watering trough for animals. A lower gate along the same passage also granted direct access to the market gardens.

==== The palace complex ====
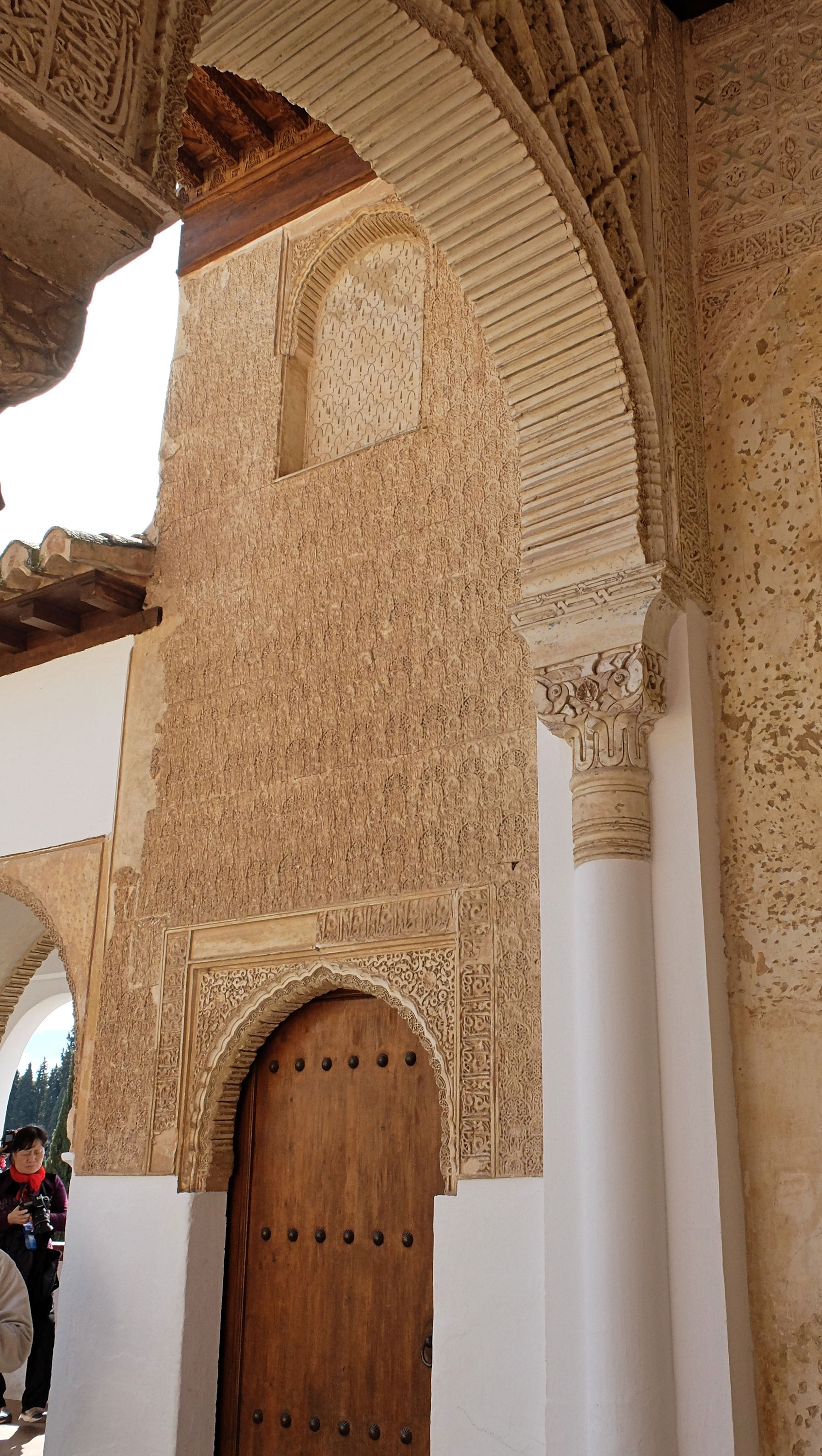
A small remaining section of the old Nasrid-era western wall of the Patio de la Acequia; most of the wall has been replaced today by a lower open gallery

The Patio de la Acequia, the Patio de la Sultana, and the Water Stairway (Escalera del Agua) all existed in the Nasrid period before the 16th century, although the Patio de la Sultana has been completely remade since then. The Patio de la Acequia retains significant original elements alongside later modifications. Its gardens are modern replacements but they follow the original layout: a quadripartite division with a central water channel running down its long middle axis. The pavilion structure at the southern end of the courtyard, the Pabellón Sur ("Southern Pavilion"), has been the most heavily modified section, but was originally part of the main residence for the ruler and his family. The southwestern wall of the gardens, which today consists of an open gallery passage lined with windows overlooking the Alhambra, was originally a much taller wall with no windows, making the garden much more private. A short portion of the original wall, still covered with decoration, still exists at the northern end. The mirador (lookout pavilion) at the middle of the wall, however, with its low windows and interior stucco decoration, did exist in the original wall and allowed for views onto the outside. The northern pavilion of the courtyard, which contains the Salón Regio, preserves more of its original elements. The projecting tower on its north side, which includes another mirador chamber with original stucco decoration, was added by Isma'il I in 1319. However, the current upper story of the pavilion, consisting of an open gallery, was added by the Catholic Monarchs in 1494.

The Generalife had all the required amenities of a full self-contained private palace. These included a bathhouse and a prayer room, whose remains were excavated after the 1958 fire. The bathhouse was likely located close to the present-day Patio de la Sultana, where remains of its hypocaust system and of a large water channel were uncovered. The prayer room, which is mentioned in 16th-century sources, likely stood on the site of the small present-day pavilion known as the Romantic Pavilion (Pabellón Romántico), located at the top of the Water Stairway. Old foundations were discovered here under the current structure which was built in 1836.

The original gardens of the palace had very little botanical relation to the present-day gardens which reflect 19th-century and 20th-century Spanish tastes. Thanks to the early 16th-century descriptions of Navagero and to the 1958 excavations, the original characteristics of the gardens are known. In the Patio de la Acequia the flower beds were sunken below the level of the surrounding walkways. The beds were not very deep, indicating that they were planted with relatively low plants like myrtle bushes, although some deeper pits were made to allow for larger plants like orange trees. The fountains of the original Generalife were also different. The lines of water jets in the Patio de la Acequia are not original and were installed in the 19th century. However, jet fountains were probably still present in some parts of the palace. Navagero, for example, described a fountain in one of the lower courtyards (probably the Patio de Polo) which spouted a jet of water ten yards into the air. This has been tentatively corroborated by the remains of the palace's extensive water supply infrastructure which seems to have provided more water than would have been needed for simple irrigation.

=== Water supply system ===
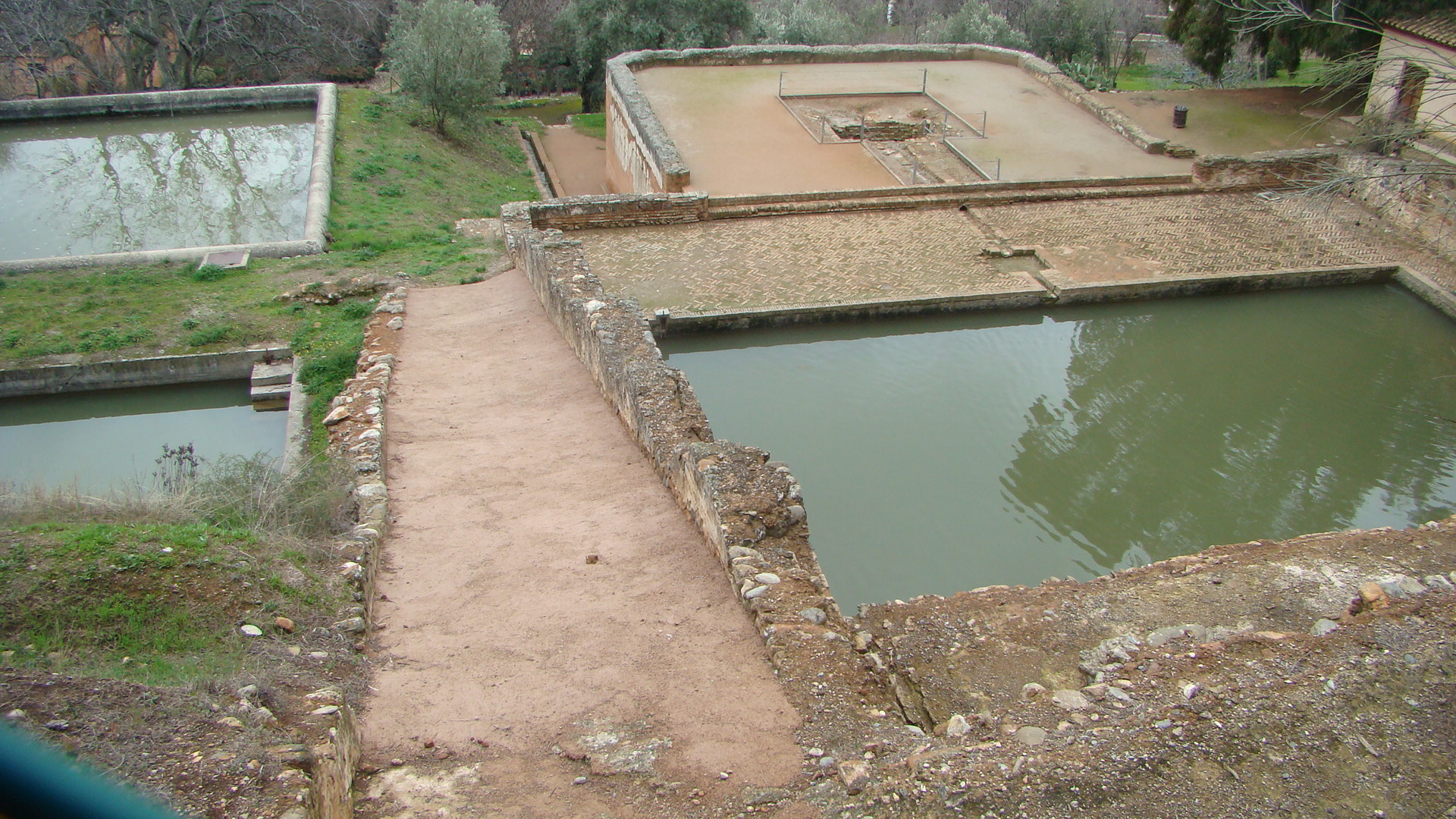
The Albercones above the Generalife: the old Nasrid reservoir is visible on the right, with the main well and former tower platform beyond it; on the left are the two modern reservoirs added in the 20th century

Water was provided to the Generalife by the Acequia Real (also known as the Acequia del Rey or Acequia del Sultan), which also supplied water to the Alhambra more generally and still exists in large part today. It draws water from the Darro River at an uphill location in the foothills of the Sierra Nevada, about 6.1 kilometers east of the Alhambra. A smaller branch known as the Acequia del Tercio also split off from it several kilometers upstream and proceeded along higher ground before arriving at the Generalife near the present-day Pabellón Romántico, allowing for the provision of water to the upper gardens, the Water Stairway, and the former bathhouse. The main branch, proceeding along lower ground, also arrives at the Generalife palace and supplies water to the Patio de la Acequia. The channels generally ran along the surface but some parts ran through tunnels cut directly into the bedrock. These channels, in combination with a complex hydraulic system of water tanks and water wheels, supplied and distributed water for the whole gardens.

One part of this hydraulic complex, the Albercones, consists of a medieval water tank which could hold 400 cubic meters and allowed for the irrigation of higher orchards and gardens. It is located on the hillside above the Jardines Nuevos today. Two more modern reservoirs also exist next to it today: one built by Torres Balbas in 1926, and another added by Prieto Moreno in the 1930s. The reservoir was supplied with water through a well 17.4 meters deep located on a platform on its southwest side, which was originally covered by a rammed-earth tower inside which was an animal-powered water-wheel mechanism that drew water from the well. The well leads to an underground gallery or channel whose lower opening is near the present-day Paseo de las Adelfas. This underground gallery drew water directly from the Acequia Real as it flowed past the gardens, as well as from the higher Acequia del Tercio which intersected it. Both canals continue past the Albercones and join together before turning back towards the Alhambra, where the water enters via an aqueduct next to the Torre del Agua at the Alhambra's east end.

== Cultural influence ==
There is an imitation of part of the Generalife at Roundhay Park in Leeds, UK.

== See also ==
- Buhaira Gardens
- Palacio de Galiana, Toledo
- Spanish gardens
