= Spanish garden =

Style of garden or designed landscape

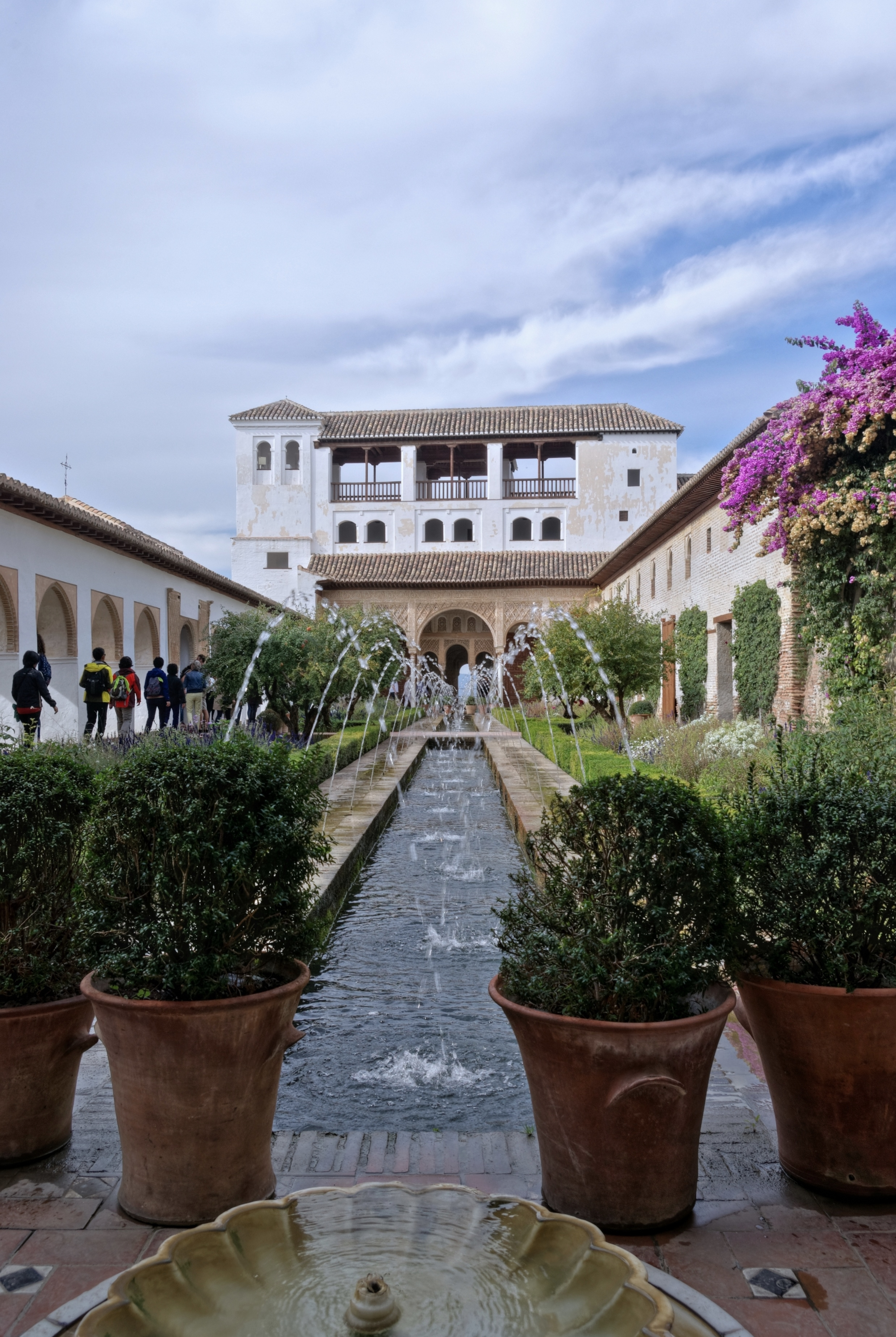
Jardín del Generalife de Granada

A traditional Spanish garden is a style of garden or designed landscape developed in historic Spain. Especially in the United States, the term tends to be used for a garden design style with a formal arrangement that evokes, usually not very precisely, the sort of plan and planting developed in southern Spain, incorporating principles and elements from precedents in ancient Persian gardens, Roman gardens and Islamic gardens, and the great Moorish gardens (historically known as riyads) of the Al-Andalus era on the Iberian Peninsula.

In other parts of Spain, public parks and large gardens have been more influenced by the Italian garden, French formal garden, and even the English landscape garden. Spain has a variety of climatic conditions, especially in altitude and rainfall, and modern Spanish gardens are very varied accordingly. Spanish urban housing has long had more apartments than small houses, and the small houses have traditionally lacked front garden, with not that much to the rear either, often just a paved patio with small beds by the walls, and space for plants in pots. Until recently, "full" gardens were mostly found in the country or very large urban houses, but some modern suburban developments have gardens closer to those of northern Europe and North America.

== Traditions ==
Traditionally, the paradise garden is interpreted with a central cross axis, in the four cardinal directions, with long ponds or water channels (a rill or stylized qanat) where water reflects and flows, set in a walled courtyard. The remaining quadrants often had fruit trees and fragrant plants. Thus, characteristic sensory experiences are refreshing coolness, humidity, sounds, greenery, and fragrance. This type of garden is compatible with the Spanish climate of sun and heat. Provisions for shade are given with the use of arcades, pergolas, trellising, and garden pavilions. Ceramic elements and tiles are often used: in water features; for structural, decorative, and seating elements; and as paving; with solid fields, embellishments and accents; and in pottery. A clarity from the symmetrical simplicity often results.

== Historical design eras ==
Spain has a long tradition of making gardens. Significant gardens were made by:

- immigrants from the Carthaginian and Roman Empires; for example, the Palmeral of Elche in Alicante
- nobility, Christians in the Spanish Medieval period
- Islamic rulers and artisans of Al-Andalus, the Moorish Iberian Peninsula or Spanish territories, especially in present-day Andalusia in Southern Spain; for example, the Alhambra, Generalife in Granada.
- post-Reconquista Mudéjar design and artisans; for example, the Alcázar of Seville.
- catholic monarchs during the Spanish Renaissance, Spanish Gothic, and Spanish Baroque periods; for example, the Royal Palace of La Granja de San Ildefonso.
- landowning and business dynasties during the Romantic and Modern periods; for example, Park Güell.
- civic projects and expositions; for example, Maria Luisa Park and Plaza de España in Seville.
- In 21st century Spain, gardens are designed by garden and landscape designers, horticulturalists, artists, architects, and landscape architects; for example, the Olympic village public outdoor spaces for the 1992 Barcelona Olympics or the public spaces for the Universal Exposition of Seville Expo '92.

Many historic gardens are protected by a heritage designation, Jardín histórico.

== Gallery ==
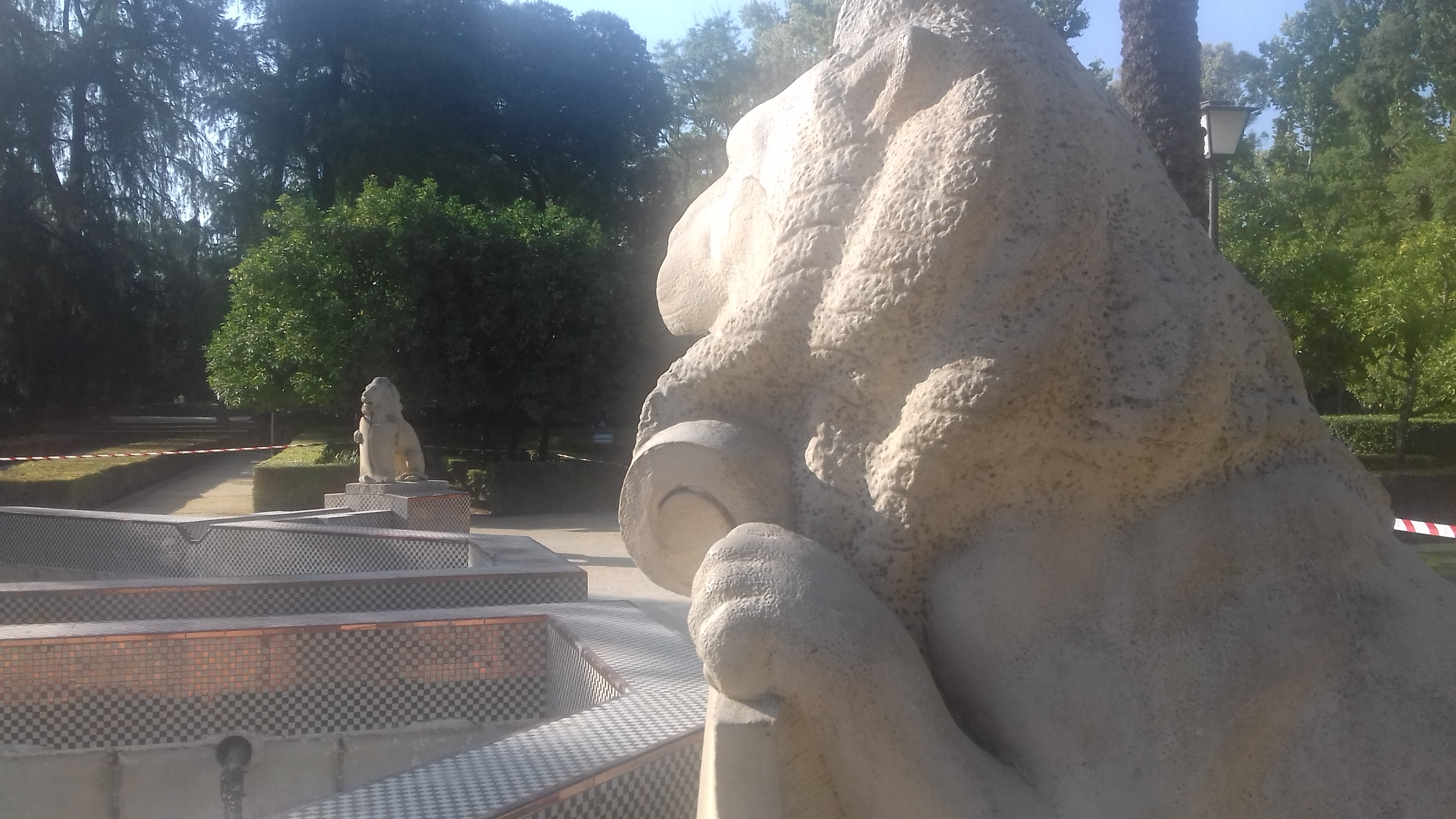
Garden of the Lions from Maria Luisa Park

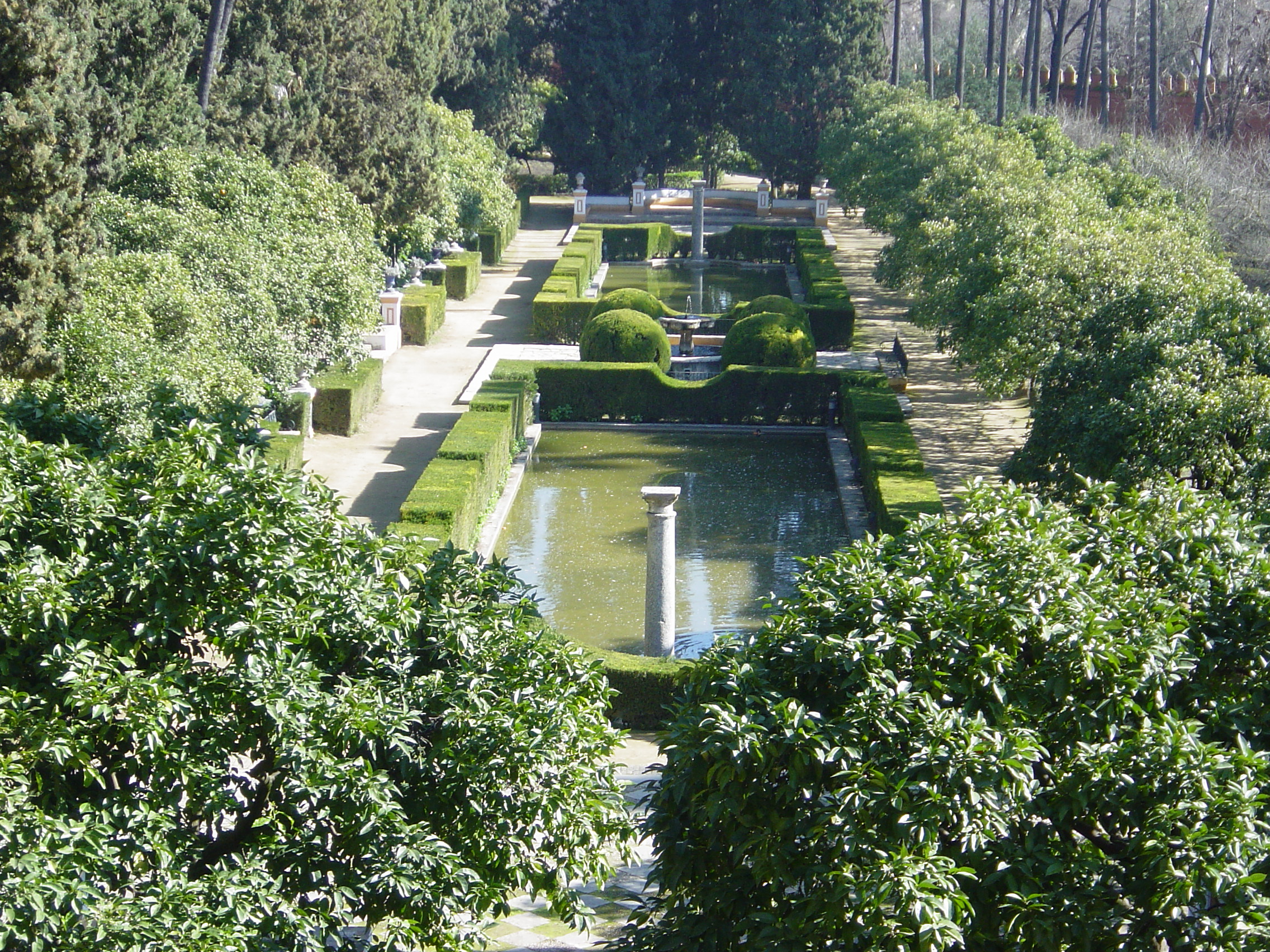
Gardens from Alcázar of Seville.

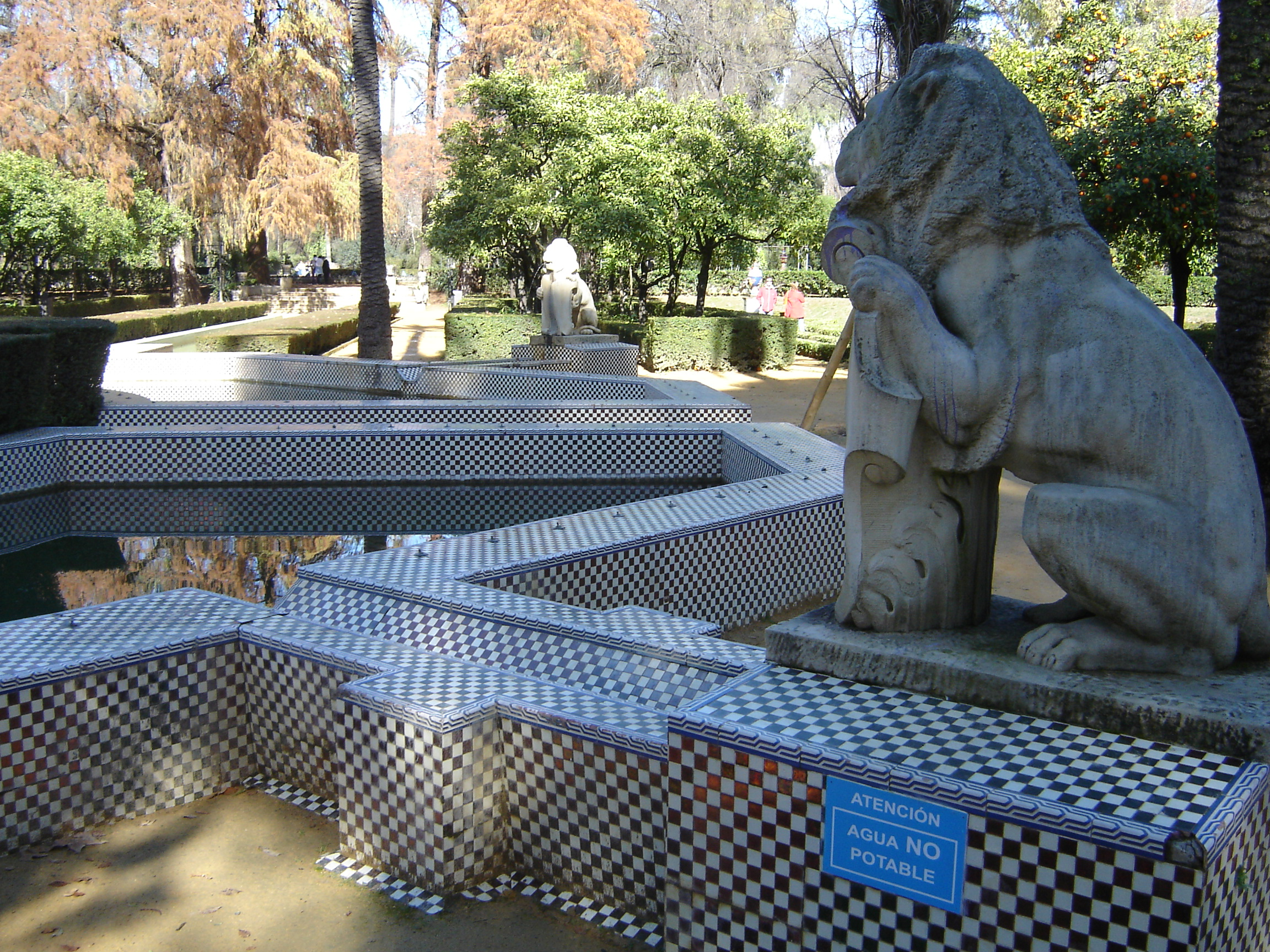
Maria Luisa Park, Seville

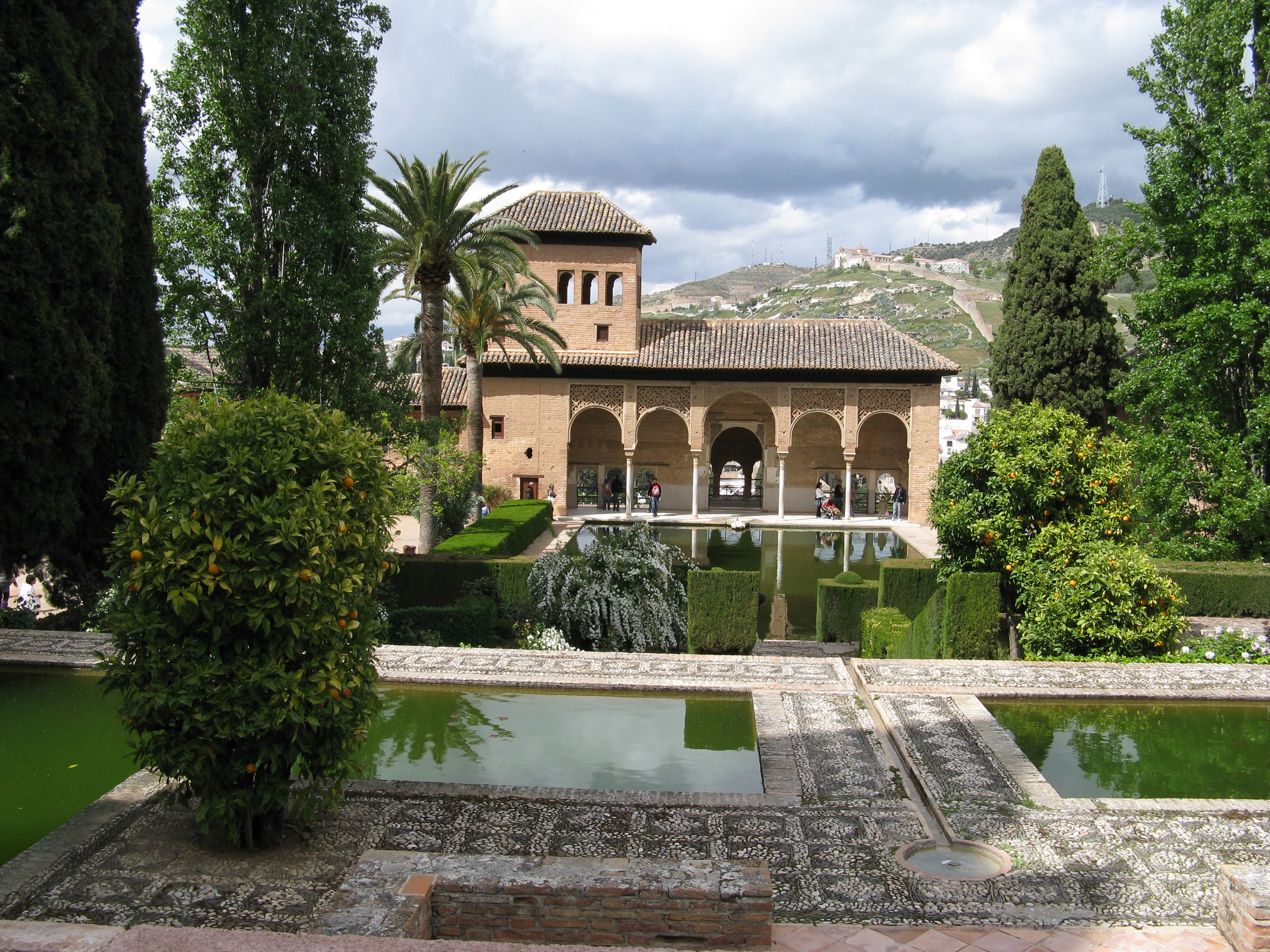
Jardín de la Alhambra

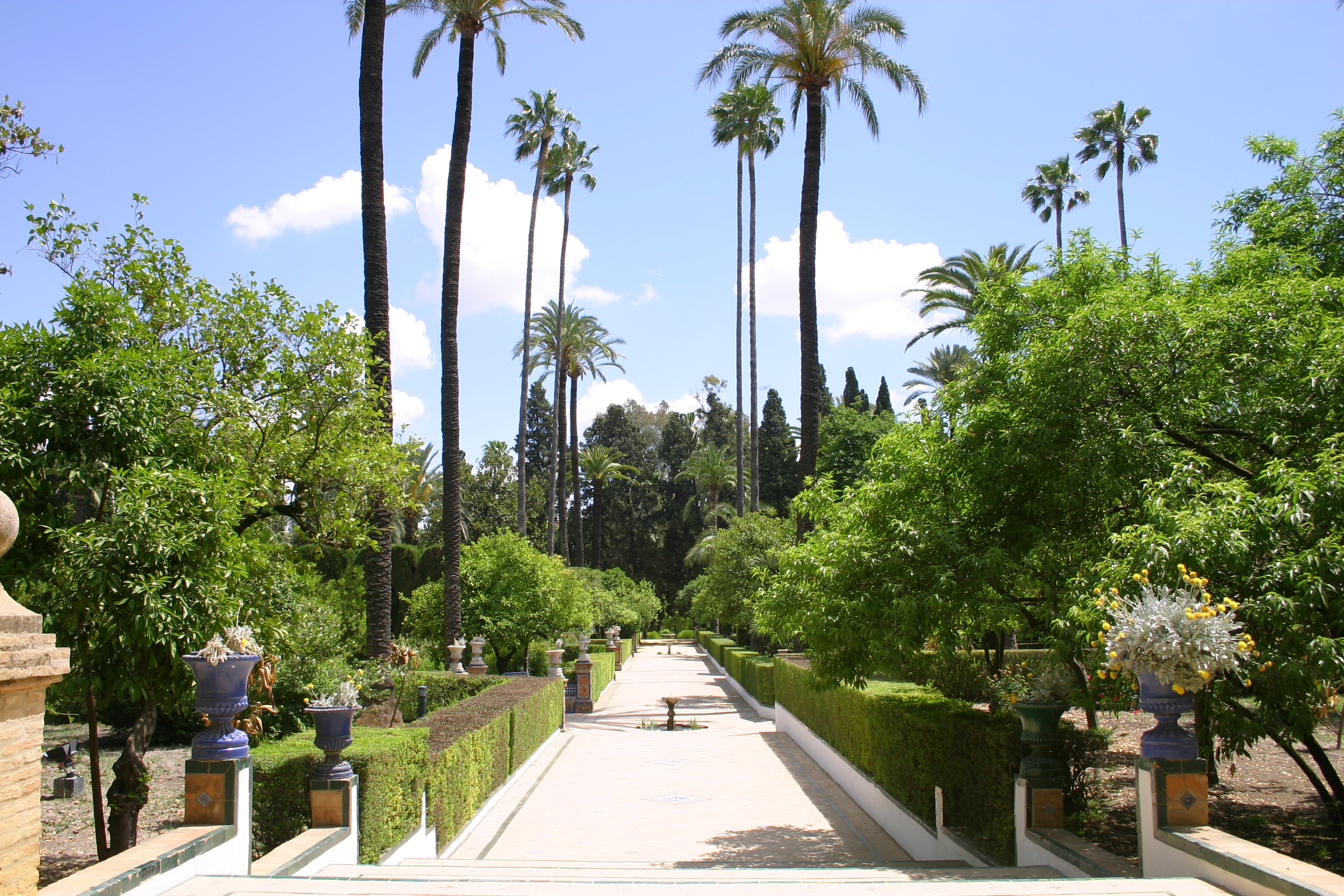
Jardín del Alcázar de Sevilla

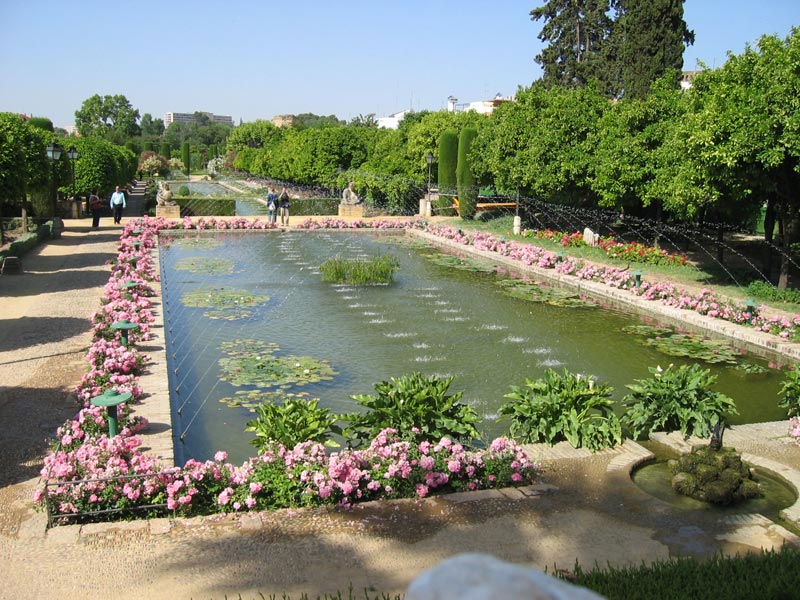
Jardín del Alcázar de Córdoba

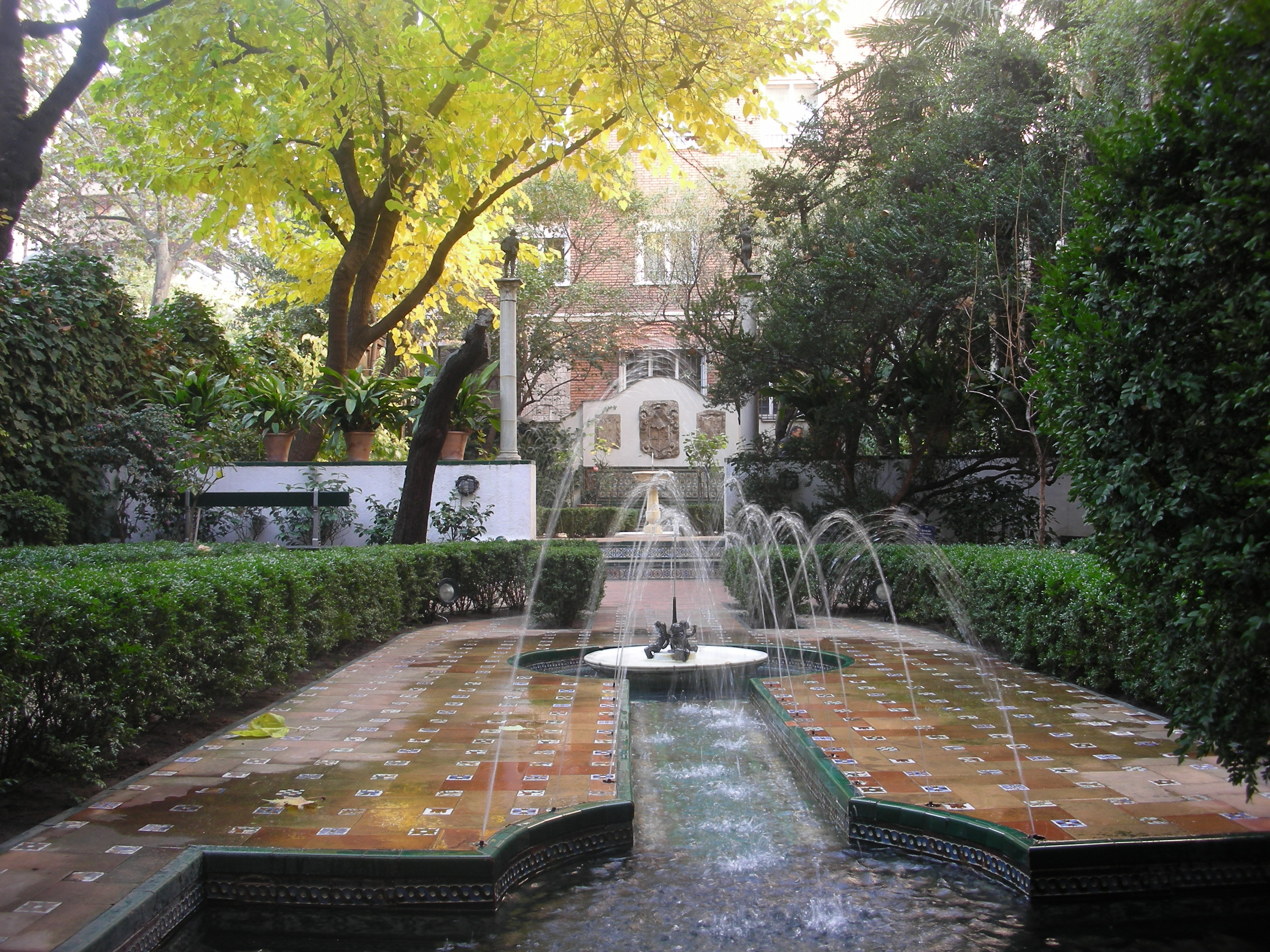
Jardín del Museo Sorolla de Madrid

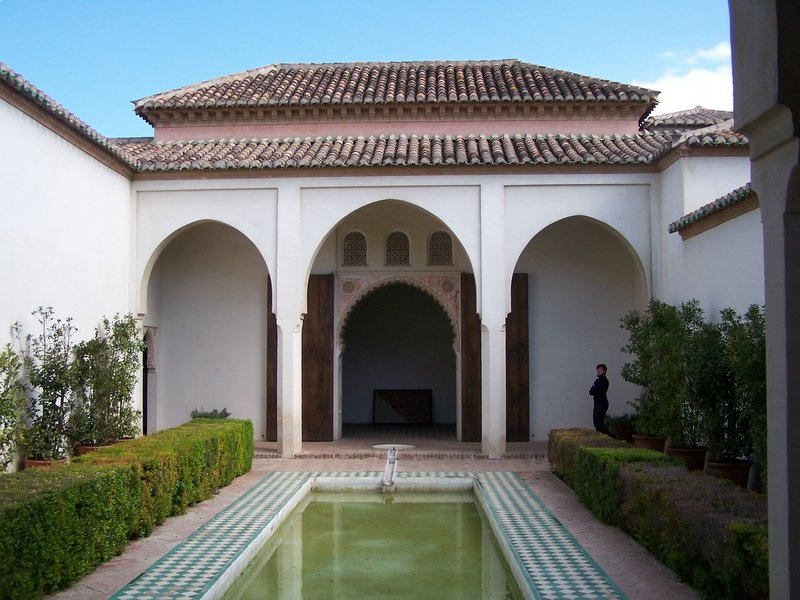
Jardín de la Alcazaba de Málaga

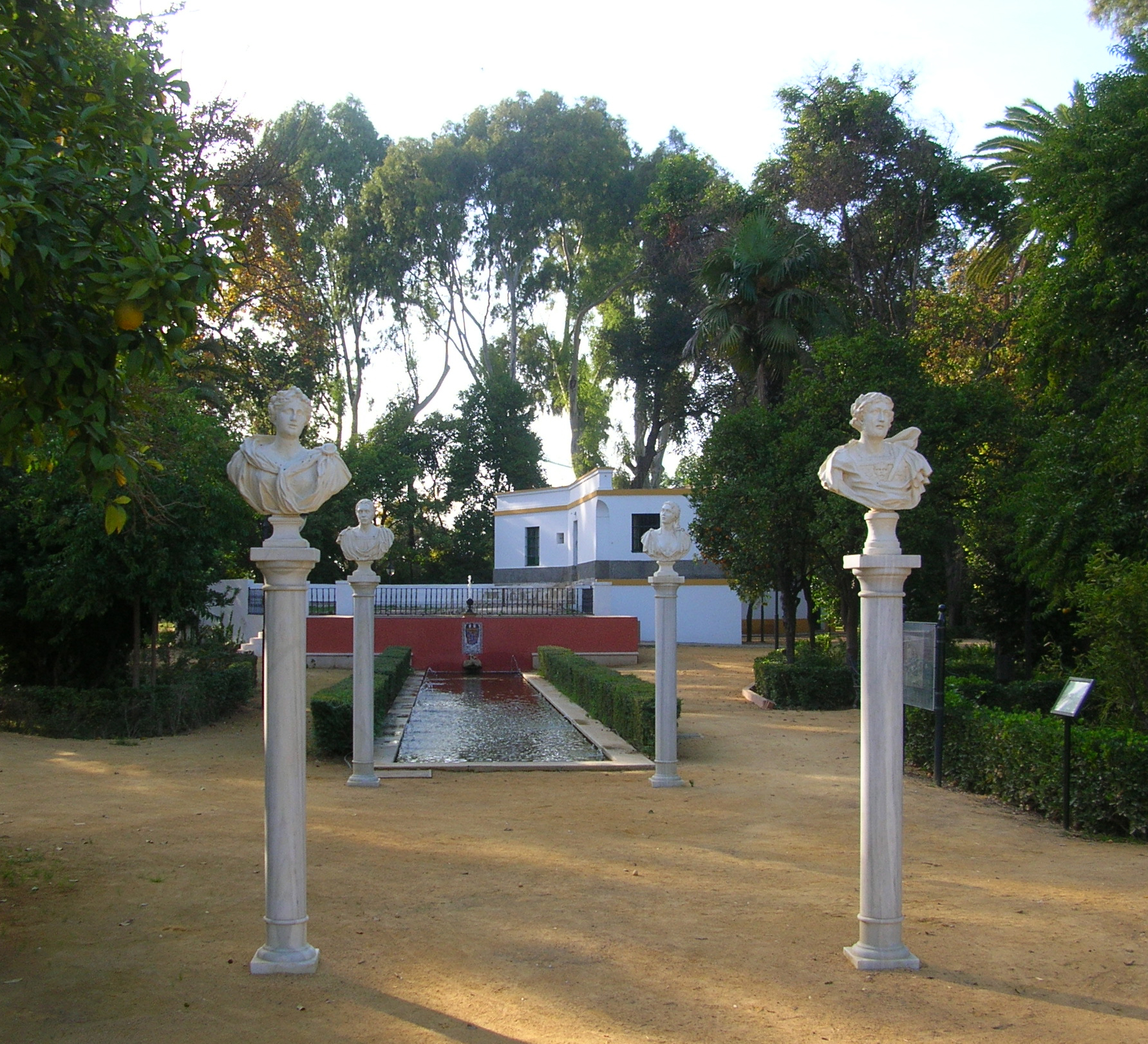
Jardines de las Delicias de Sevilla

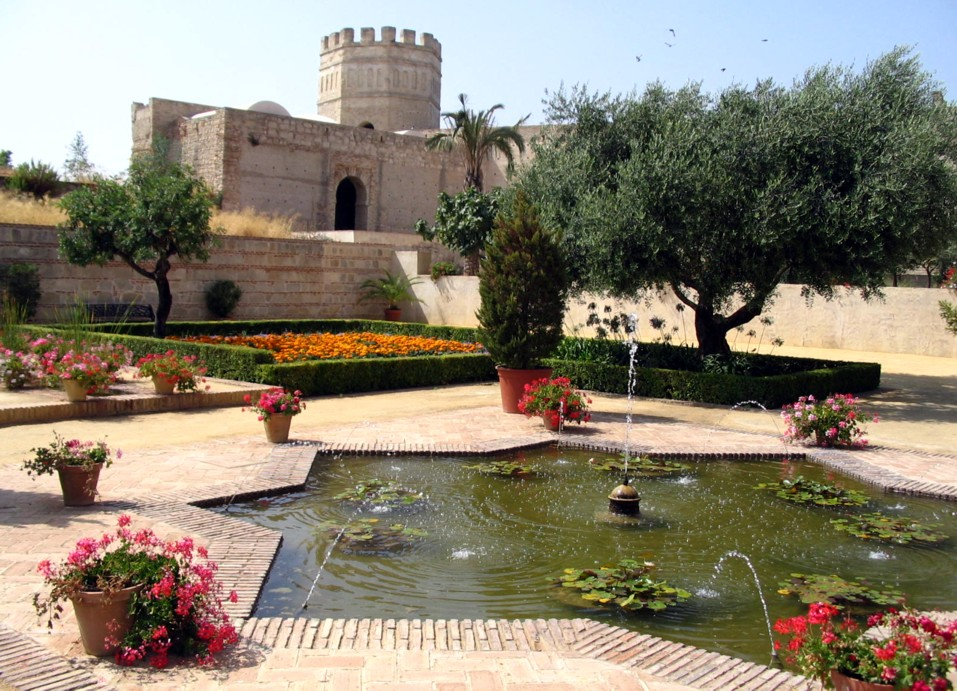
Jardín del Alcázar de Jerez

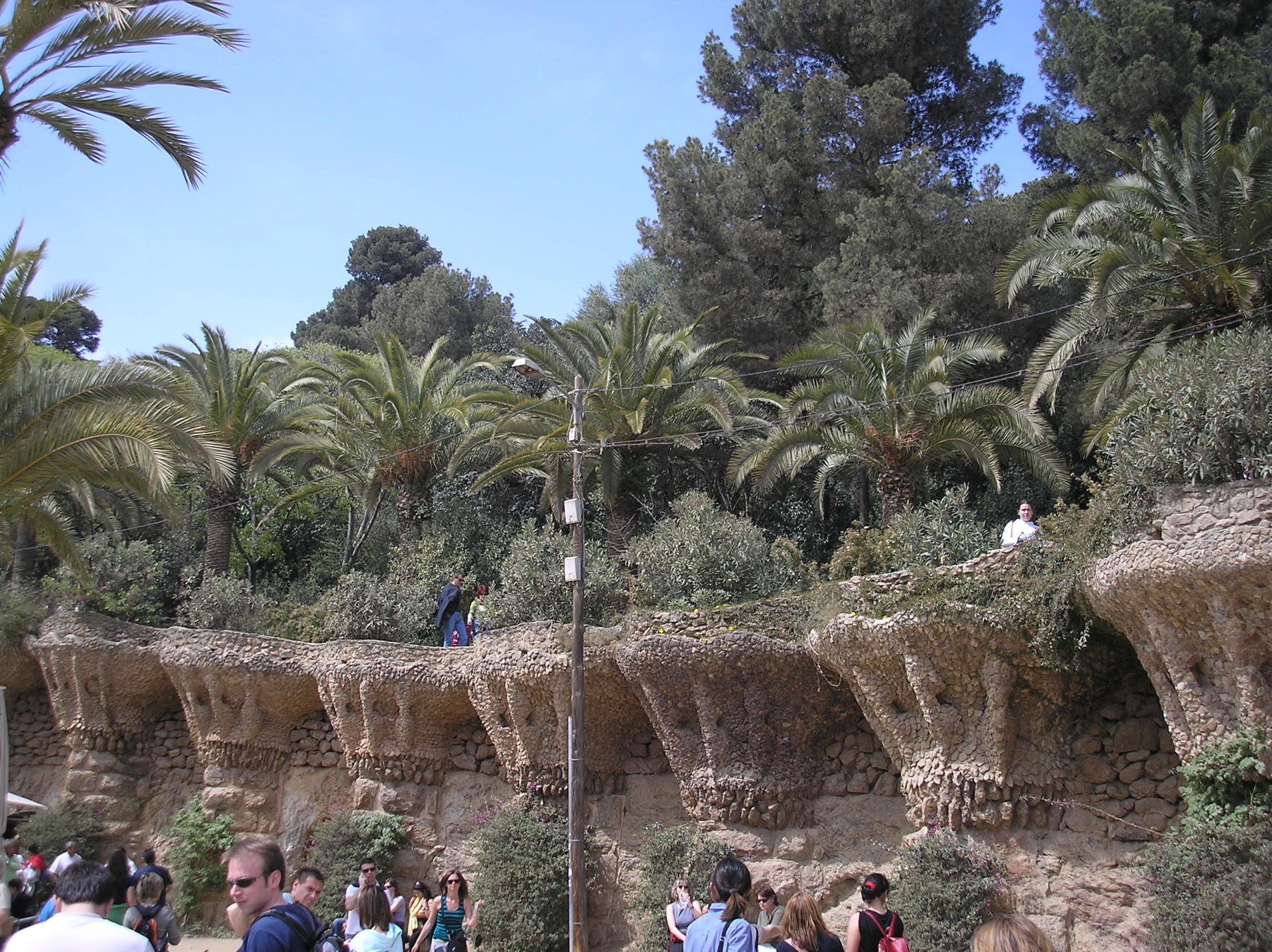
Bird nests built by Gaudí in the Park Güell terrace walls.

== See also ==
- Gardening in Spain
- List of garden types
