= Niizawa Senzuka Kofun Cluster =

Kofun period burial mound in Japan

- 新沢千塚古墳群 (Japanese)
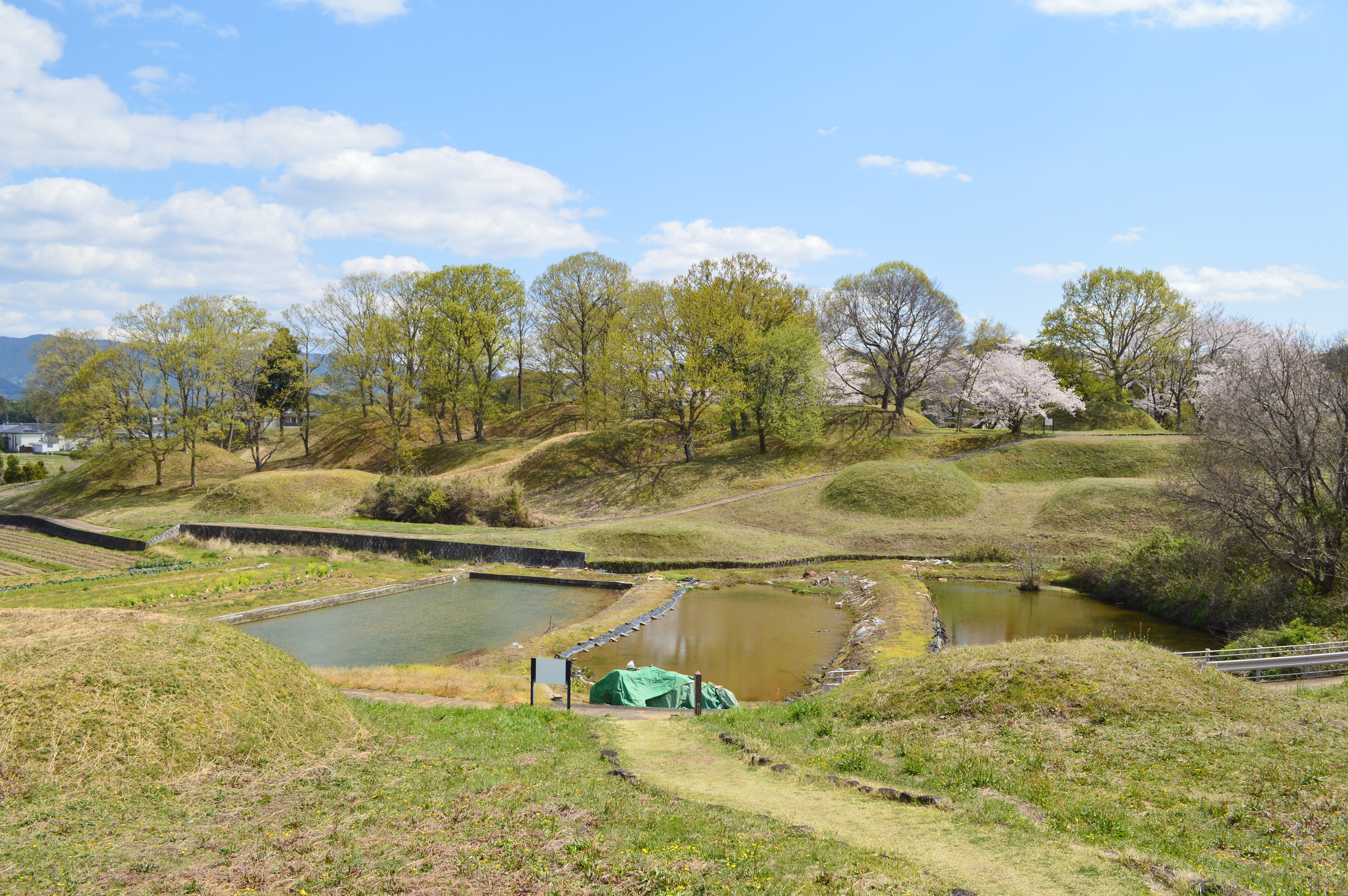
- Niizawa Senzuka Kofun Cluster

- Niizawa Senzuka Kofun Cluster Niizawa Senzuka Kofun Cluster (Japan)
- Interactive map of Niizawa Senzuka Kofun Cluster
- 34°28′40.3″N 135°46′26.2″E
- Type: Kofun
- Periods: Kofun period
- Location: Kashihara, Nara, Japan
- Region: Kansai region

History
- Built: c.4th-7th century

Site notes
- Public access: Yes (park)

Niizawa Senzuka Kofun Cluster (新沢千塚古墳群) is a group of over 600 Kofun period burial mound, located in the Kita-Ochi and Kawanishi neighborhoods of the city of Kashihara, Nara in the Kansai region of Japan. The tumulus cluster was designated a National Historic Site of Japan in 1972 . Its also known as the Toriya Senzuka Kofun Cluster (鳥屋千塚古墳群) or the Kawanishi Senzuka Kofun Cluster (新沢千塚古墳群)

== Overview ==
The Niizawa Senzuka Kofun Cluster in the northwest of the Ochioka Hills, on the hills that can be seen on both the north and south sides of the Toge-Kume Prefectural Road. The site stretches two kilometers east-to-west and two kilometers north-to-south to the south of Mount Unebi in the southern part of the Nara Basin. It consists of more than 600 burial mounds, most of which are enpun (円墳)-style circular mounds, measuring 10 to 30 meters in diameter, but the site also includes nine zenpō-kōen-fun (前方後円墳), which is shaped like a keyhole, having one square end and one circular end, when viewed from above, one zenpō-kōhō-fun (前方後方墳) shaped like two co-joined rectangles, and twelve hōfun (方墳) rectangular tumuli. These burial mounds were built from the end of the 4th century to the 7th century, and were particularly active from the mid-5th century to the end of the 6th century. The majority of the internal facilities are wooden coffins for direct burial, but some have clay coffins, gravel coffins, and horizontal-entry stone burial chambers.

Archaeological excavations began in 1947, and a full-scale survey was carried out in 1962 . At this time, 23 tumuli were excavated, including Kofun No. 500 (a keyhole-shaped tomb) with a clay coffin. In Kofun No. 500, grave goods similar to those from the early Kofun period were found, including a rare bronze mirror known as a hanging mirror. This led to the site being designated as a National Historic Site. In the 1960s, Doshisha University and other organizations conducted an investigation, investigating about 130 tumuli. A wealth of grave goods, including weapons and horse equipment, were excavated, but in Kofun No. 126, which appeared to be a small rectangular burial mound from the outside, a large number of grave goods made of gold, silver, glass, and jade including a lacquer plate, a copper handled dish, a mirror, a bead, a square gold plate with dragon pattern arabesque openwork, a silver hollow bead, a hanging gold earring, a glass dish, a glass jar, gold rings and belt fittings were excavated. The artifacts also included a fire iron (a metal vessel used as an iron by putting charcoal inside), which was the first excavated in Japan, as well as Roman glass products that are thought to have been brought by trade from the Western Regions via Silla in the late 5th century. In 2014, X-ray fluorescence analysis at the Tokyo University of Science revealed that the chemical composition of a glass dish excavated was almost identical to that of Roman glass excavated within the Roman Empire. The artifacts from Kofun No. 126 are kept at the Tokyo National Museum and are collectively designated as an Important Cultural Property.

The site is preserved as a park and is about 25 minutes on foot from Kashiharajingū-mae Station on the Kintetsu Railway Kashihara Line.

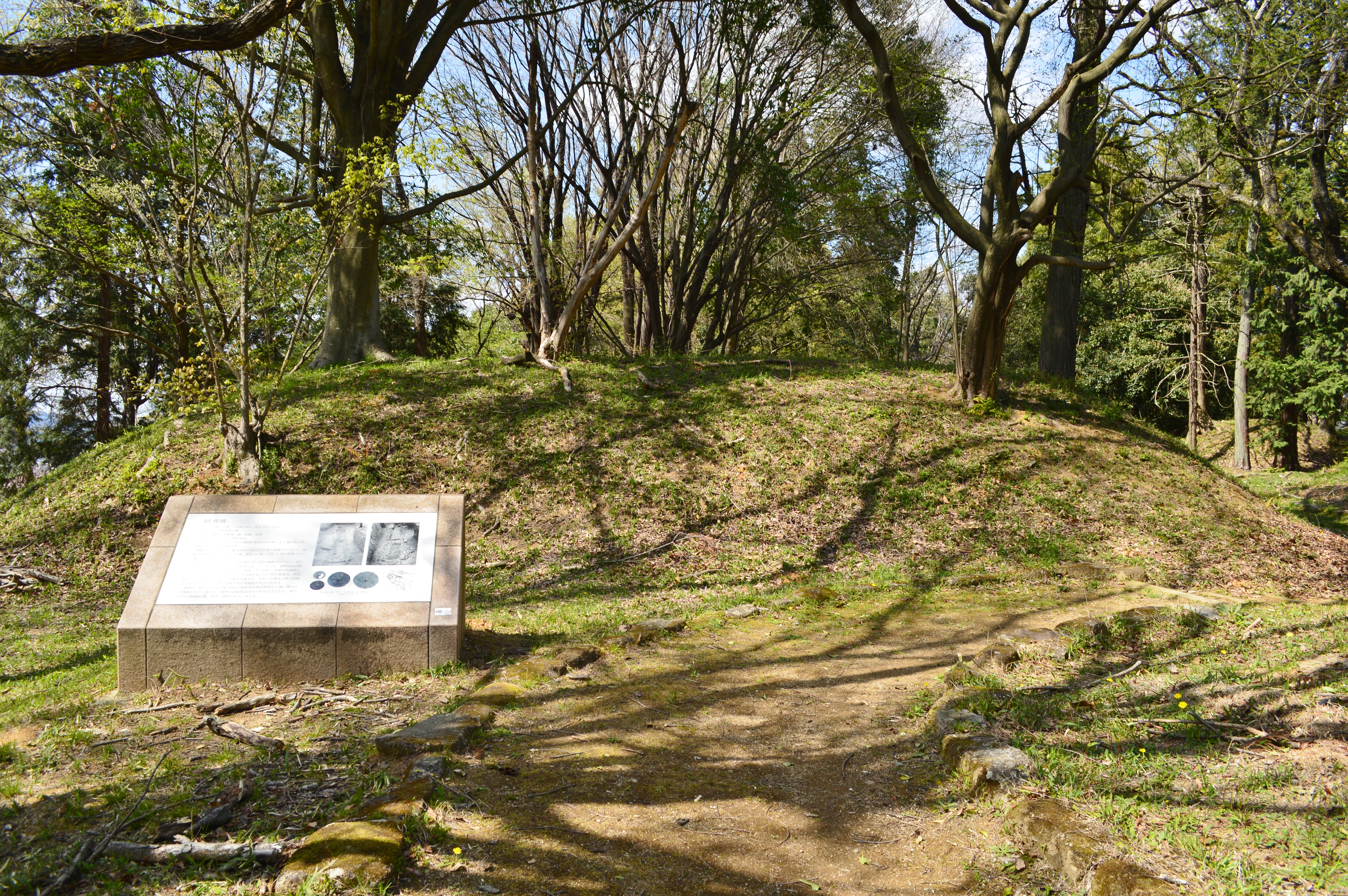
Kofun No.48

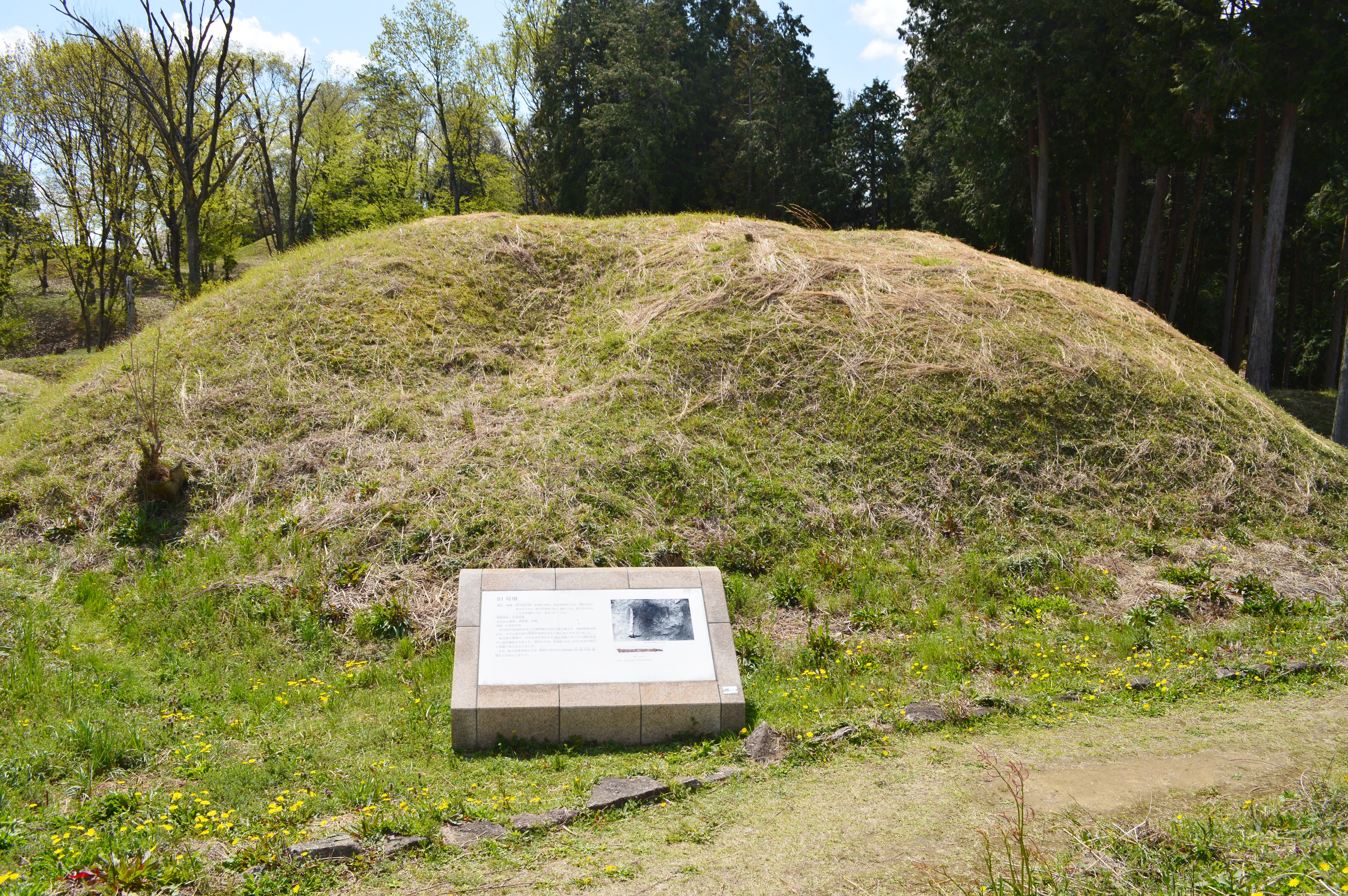
Kofun No.81

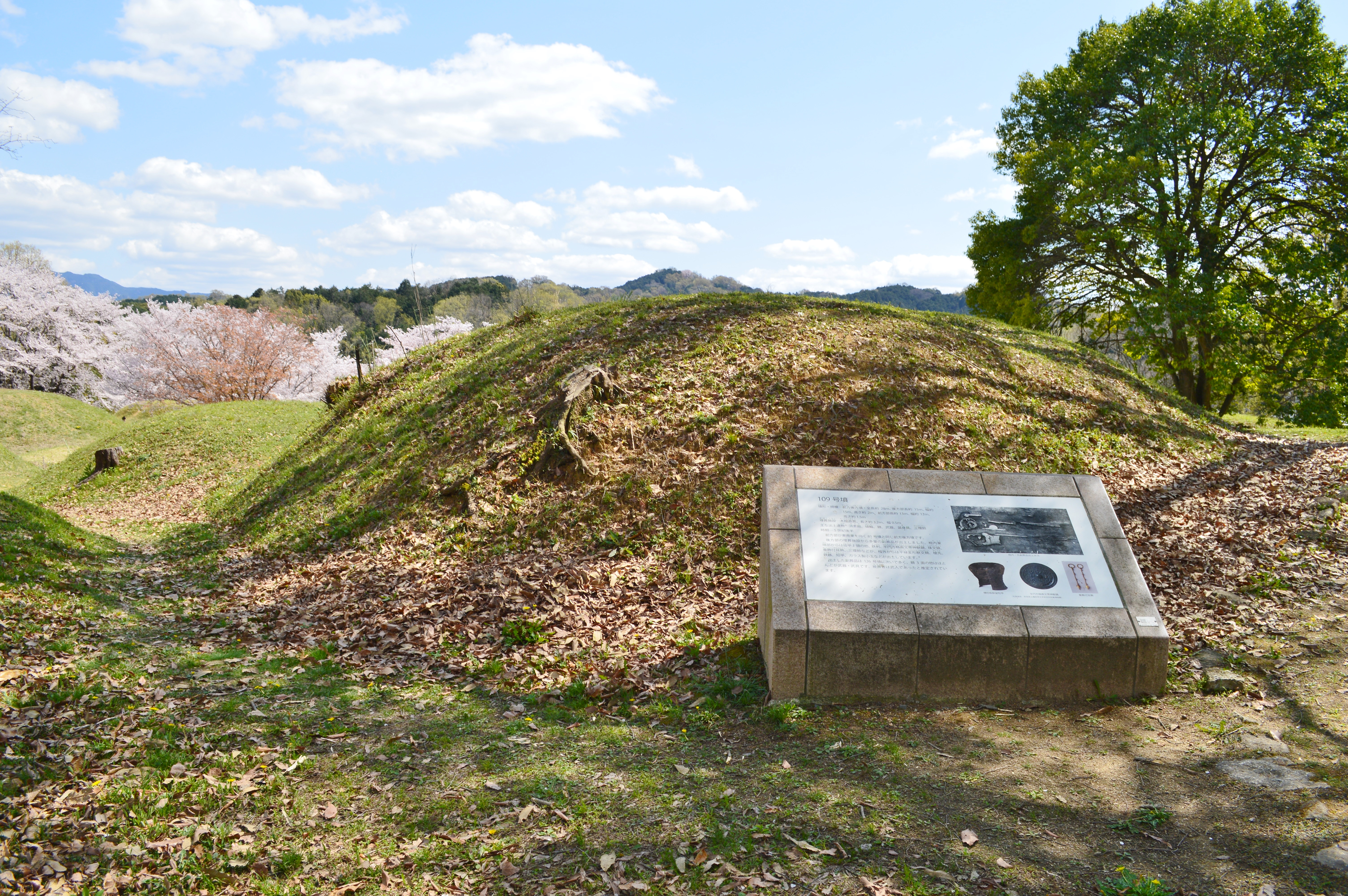
Kofun No.109

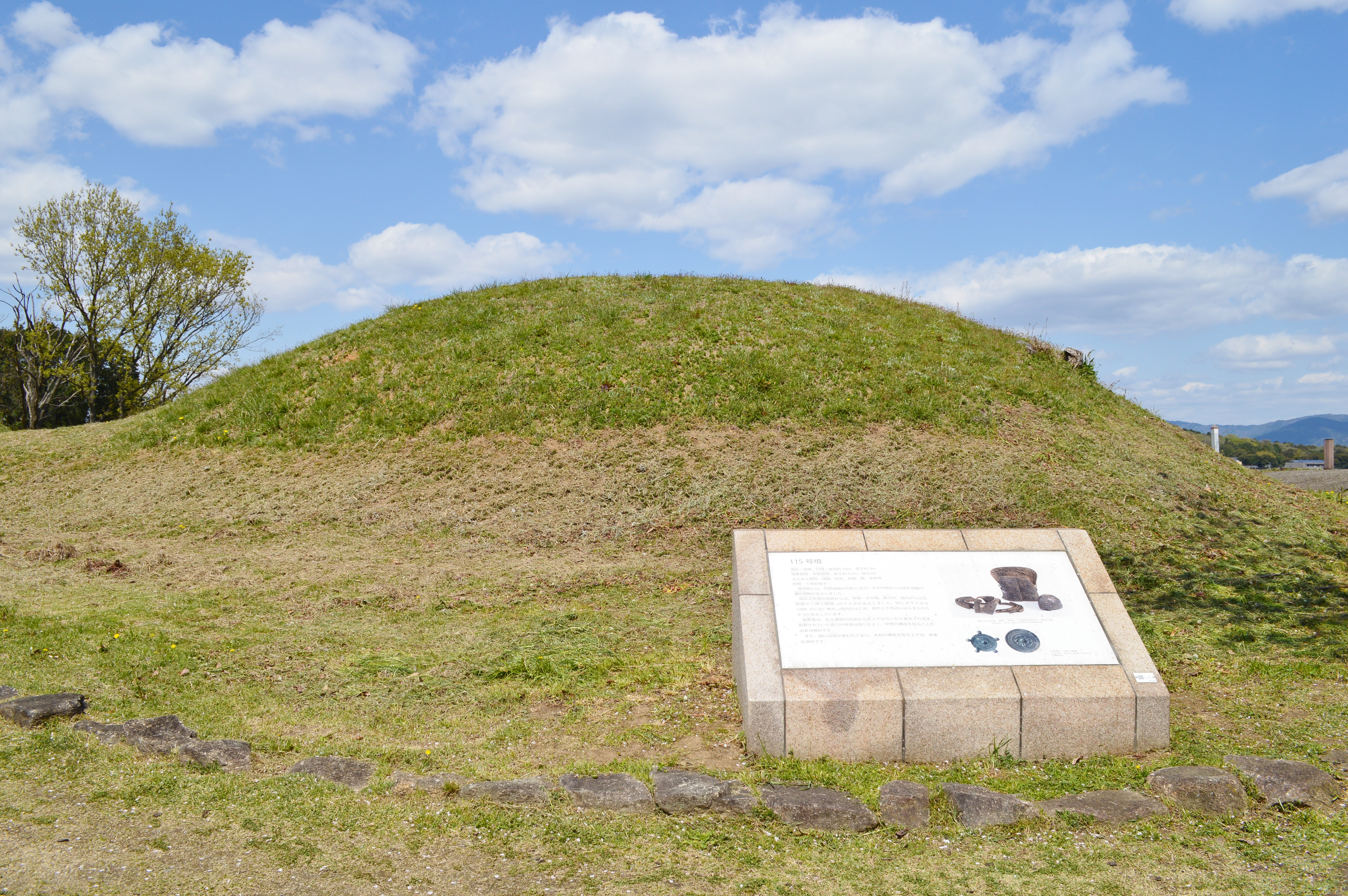
Kofun No.115

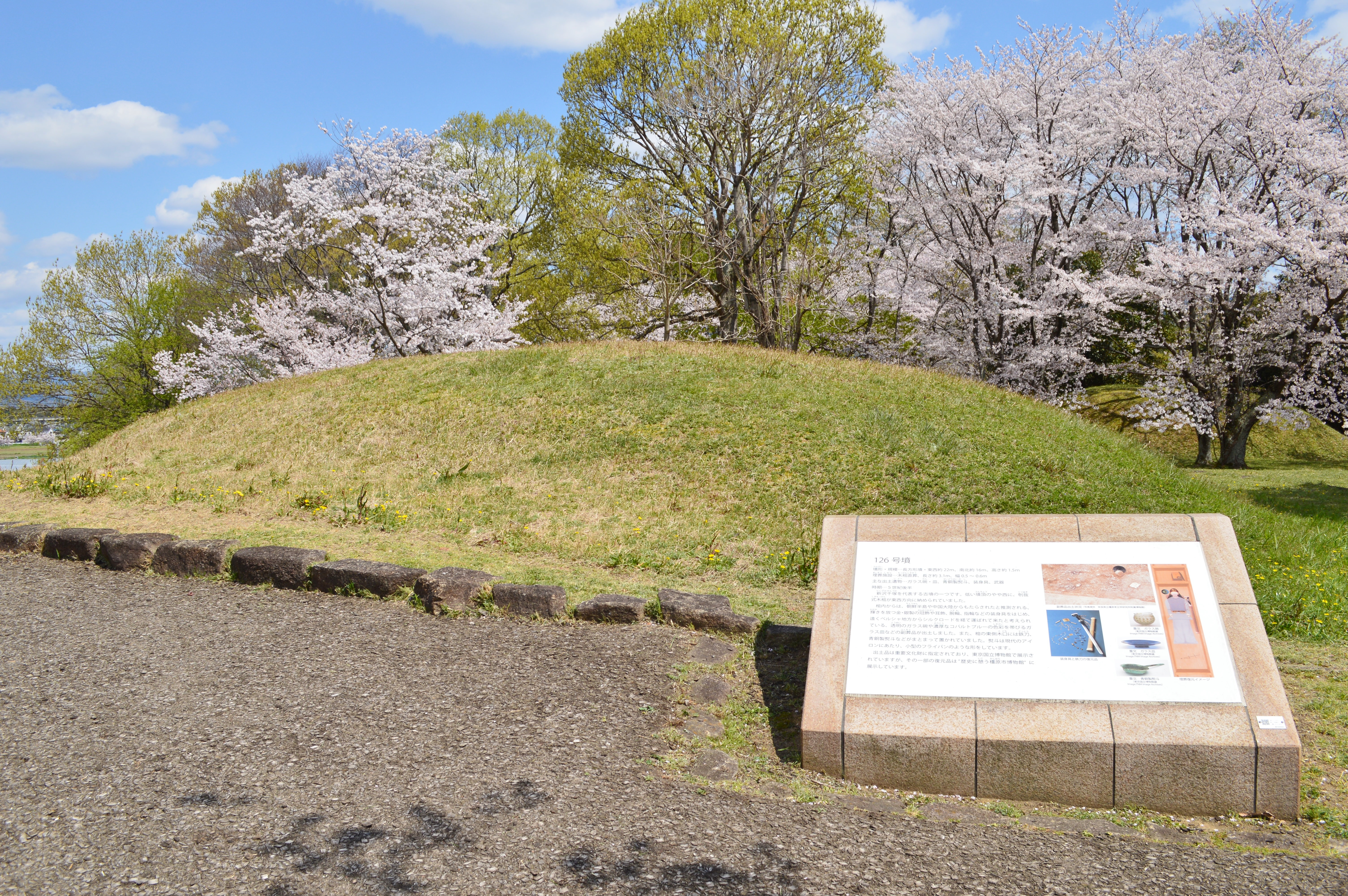
Kofun No.126

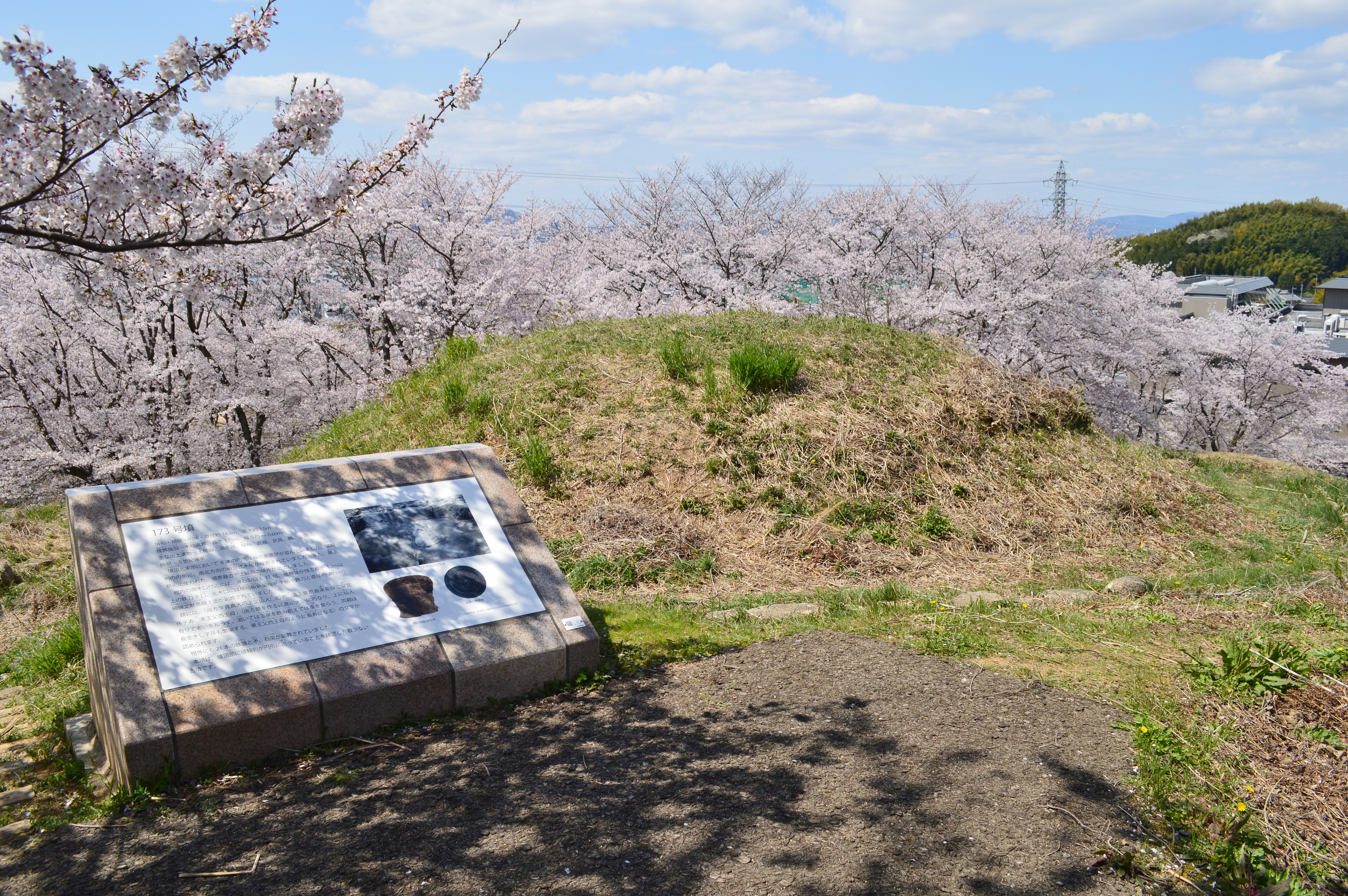
Kofun No.137

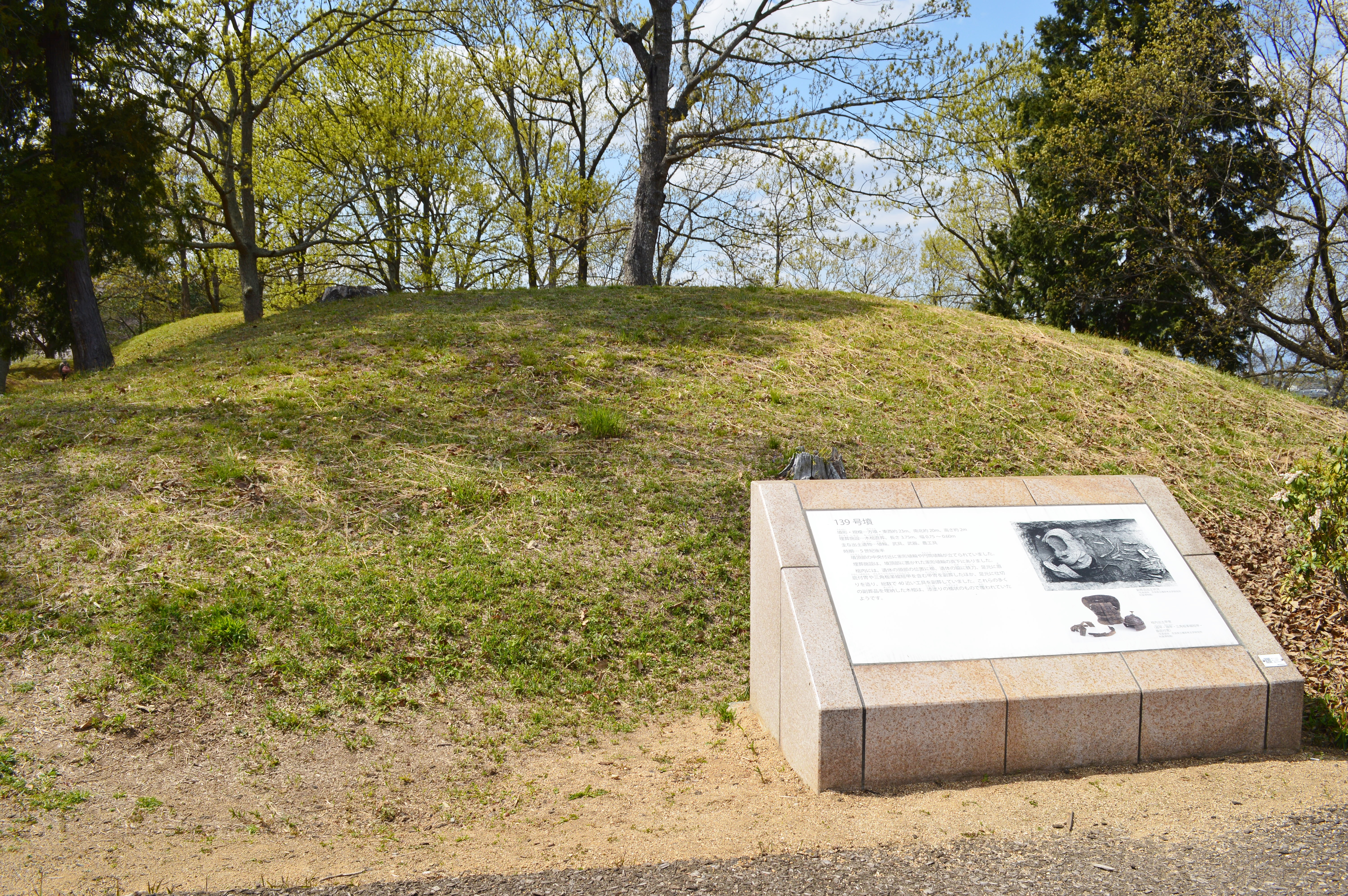
Kofun No.139

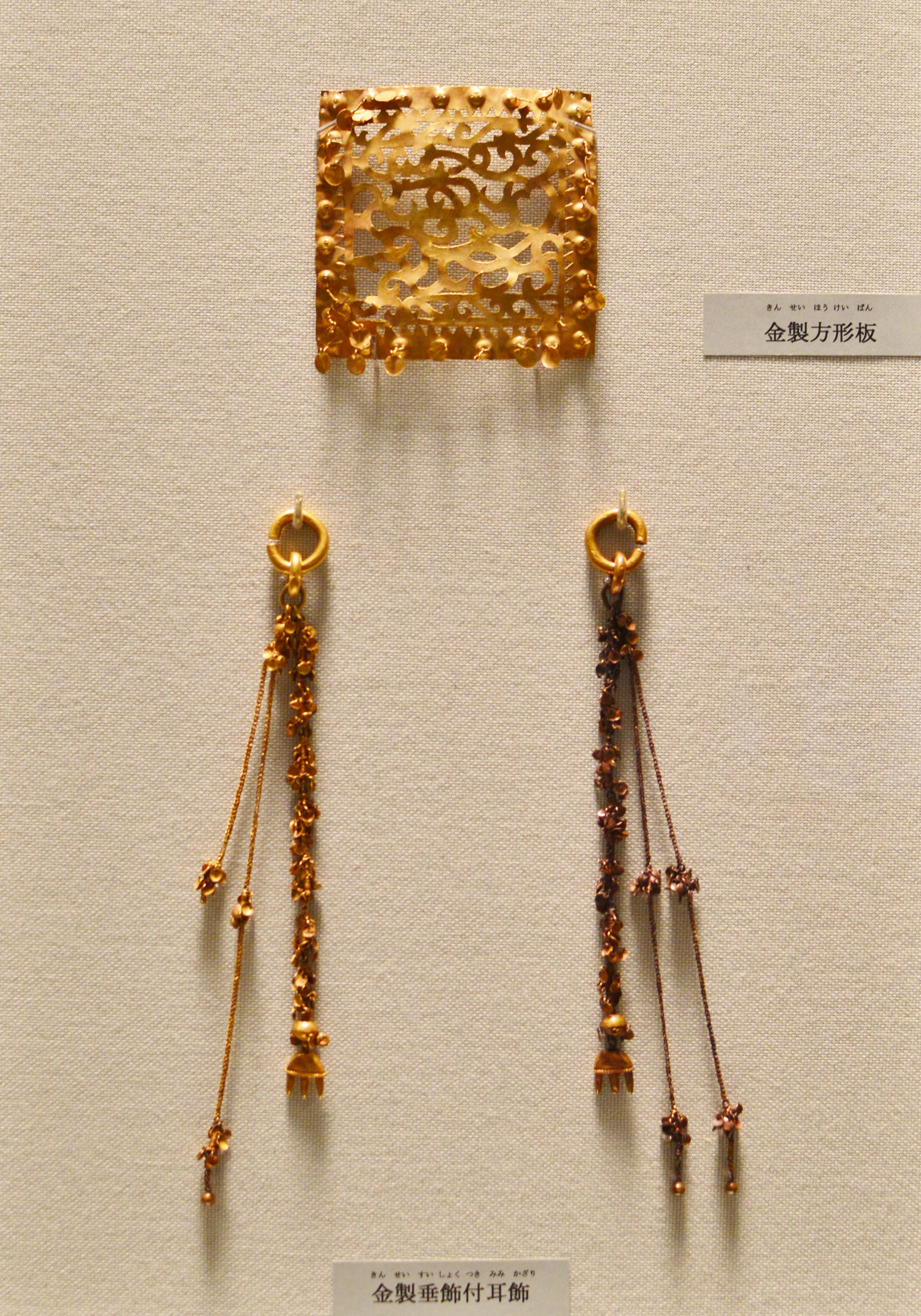
Gold square plate and gold pendant for ear ornaments unearthed from Kofun No.126

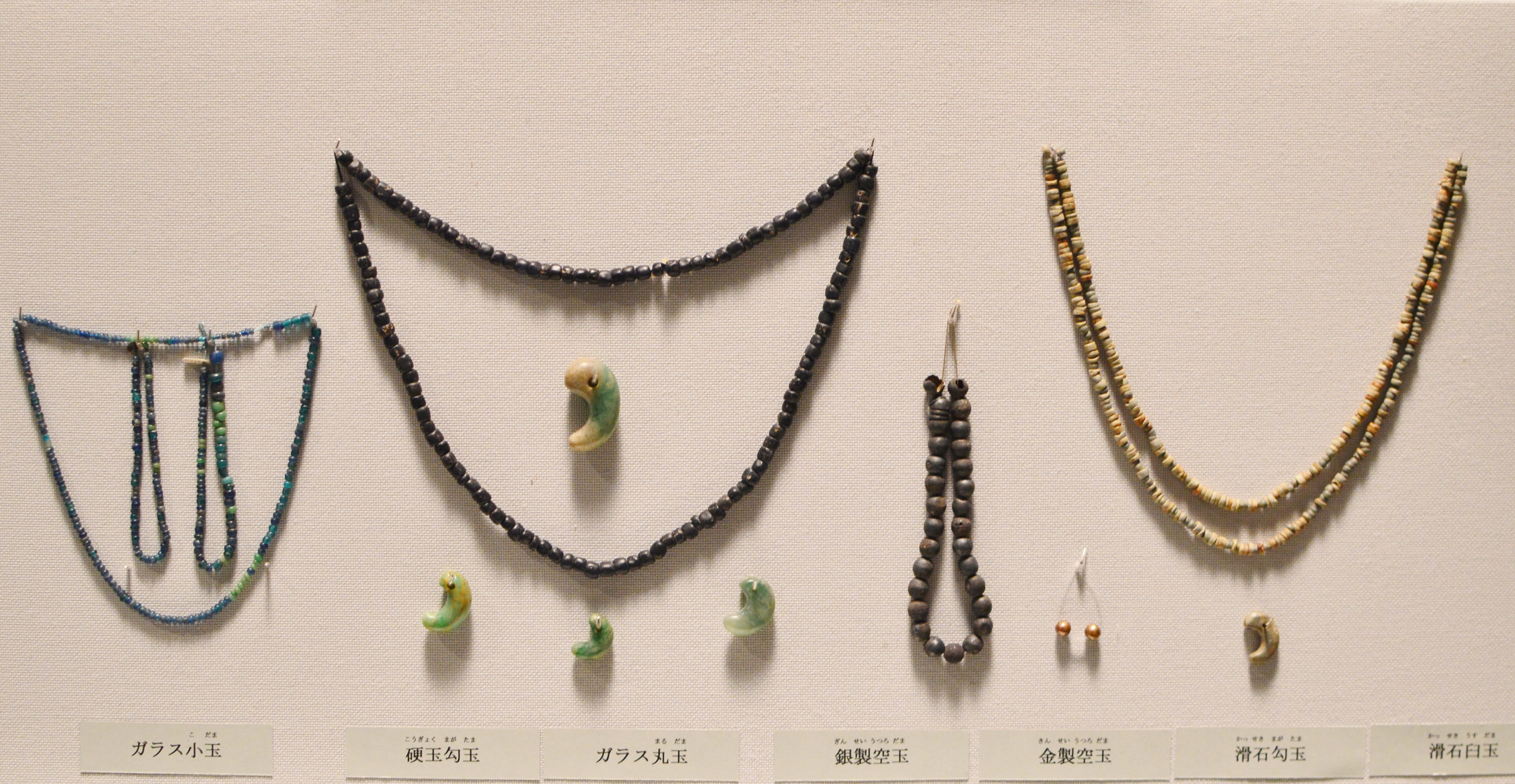
Jade unearthed from Kofun No.126

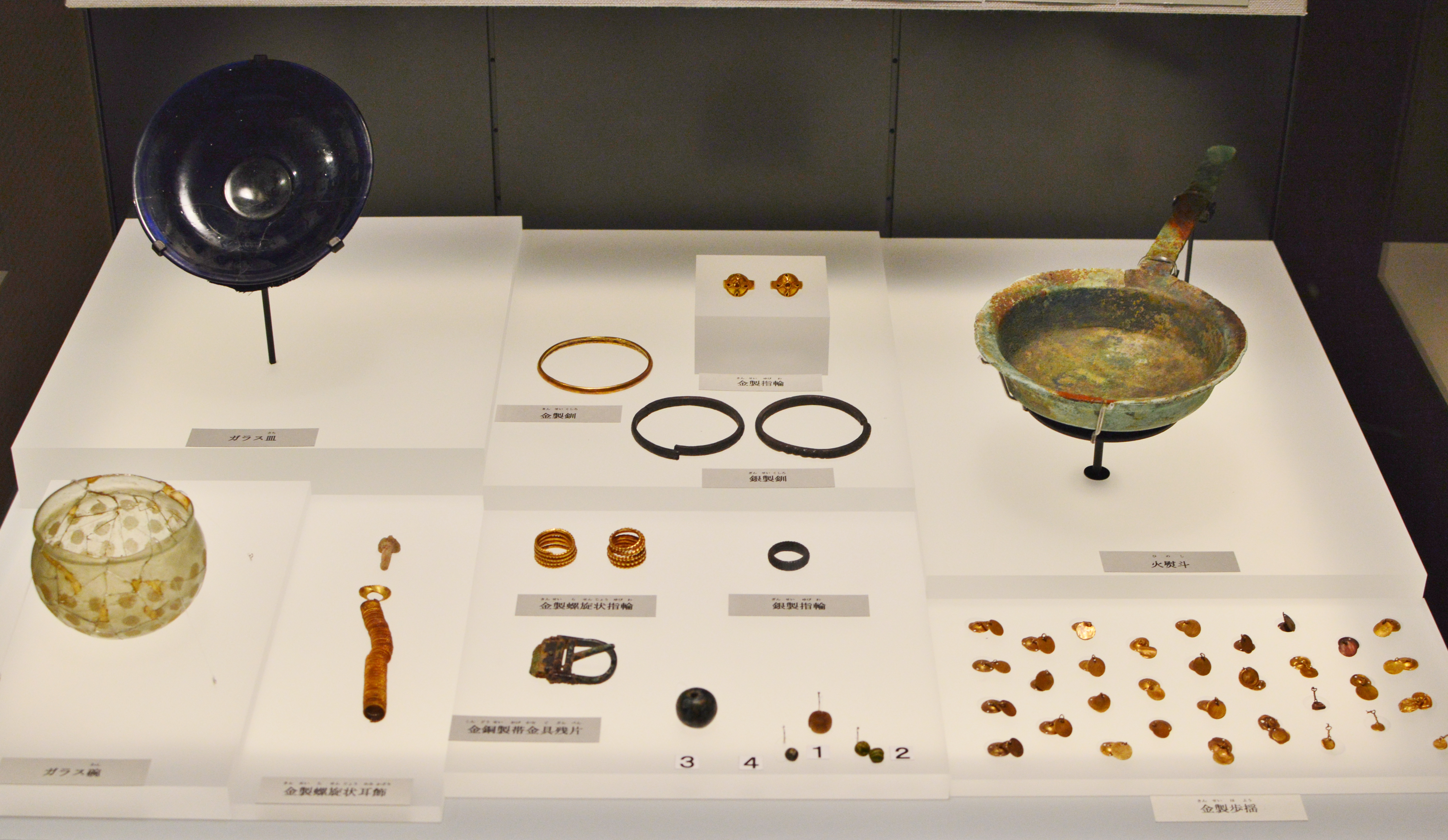
Excavated items from Kofun No.126

== See also ==
- List of Historic Sites of Japan (Nara)
