= Tawaramoto Station =

Railway station in Tawaramoto, Nara Prefecture, Japan

Tawaramoto Station 田原本駅
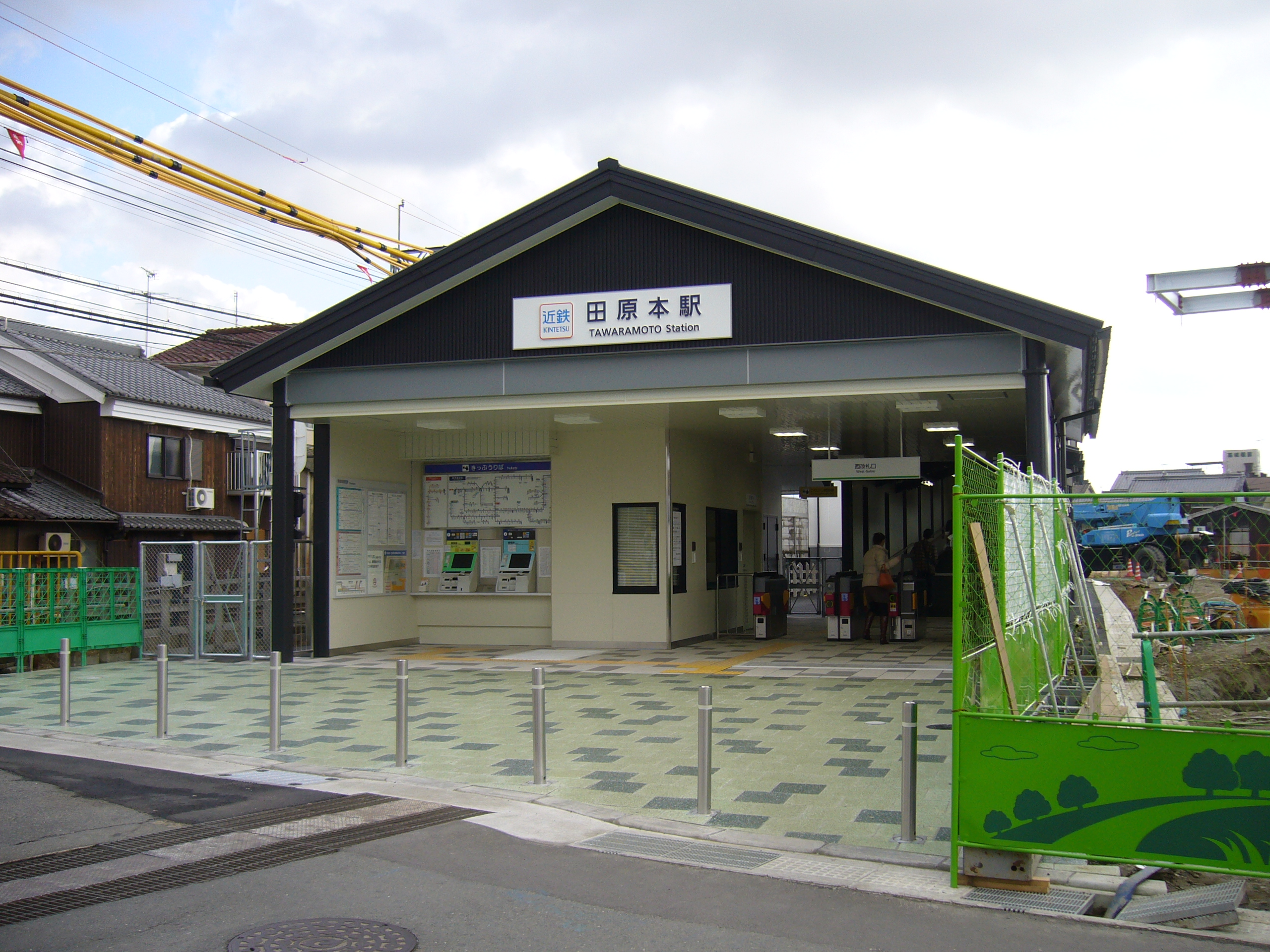
- The west entrance of Tawaramoto Station—December 2009

General information
- Location: 171, Tawaramoto-cho, Shiki-gun, Nara-ken 636-030; Japan
- Coordinates: 34°33′11″N 135°47′27″E
- System: Kintetsu Railway commuter rail station
- Owner: Kintetsu Railway
- Operator: Kintetsu Railway
- Line: B Kashihara Line
- Distance: 15.9 km (9.9 miles)
- Platforms: 2 side platforms
- Tracks: 2
- Train operators: Kintetsu Railway
- Connections: I Tawaramoto Line at Nishi-Tawaramoto Station; Nara Kotsu Bus Lines: 21 at Tawaramoto Bus Center

Construction
- Structure type: At grade
- Parking: Available
- Cycle facilities: Available
- Accessible: Yes (slopes for each ticket gate and for each platform)

Other information
- Station code: B36
- Website: Official website

History
- Opened: 21 March 1923
- Former names: Kinki-Nippon Tawaramoto (1944—1964); Kankyū Tawaramoto (1941—1944); Daiki Tawaramoto (1928—1941)

Passengers
- 2019: 4745 daily
Services
Preceding station	Kintetsu Railway	Following station
B Kashihara Line
Iwami towards Kyōto, Shin-Tanabe or Yamato-Saidaiji	Local	Kasanui towards Kashiharajingū-mae
Hirahata towards Kyōto or Yamato-Saidaiji	Express	Kashiharajingū-mae Terminus
I Tawaramoto Line
Kuroda towards Shin-Ōji	Tawaramoto Line transfer at Nishi-Tawaramoto	Terminus
Location
- Location within Nara Prefecture Location within Japan

Tawaramoto Station (田原本駅, Tawaramoto-eki) is a passenger railway station located in the town of Tawaramoto, Nara Prefecture, Japan. It is operated by the private transportation company, Kintetsu Railway.

== Line ==
Tawaramoto Station is served by the Kashihara Line and is 15.9 kilometers from the starting point of the line at Yamato-Saidaiji and 50.5 kilometers from Kyoto

== Layout ==
The station is an above-ground station with two opposing side platforms and two tracks. The effective length of the platform is enough for six cars. There are station buildings on both the outbound side (East Exit) and inbound side (West Exit), and the inbound and outbound platforms are connected by an underground passage. The East Exit ticket gates are connected to the outbound platform, and the West Exit ticket gates are connected to the inbound platform by slopes. However, there are stairs only to go between the underground passage and both platforms; there are no escalators or elevators. The station is unattended.

== Platforms and tracks ==
1	■ Kashihara Line	for Yamato-Yagi and Kashihara-Jingumae
2	■ Kashihara Line	for Yamato-Saidaiji and Kyoto

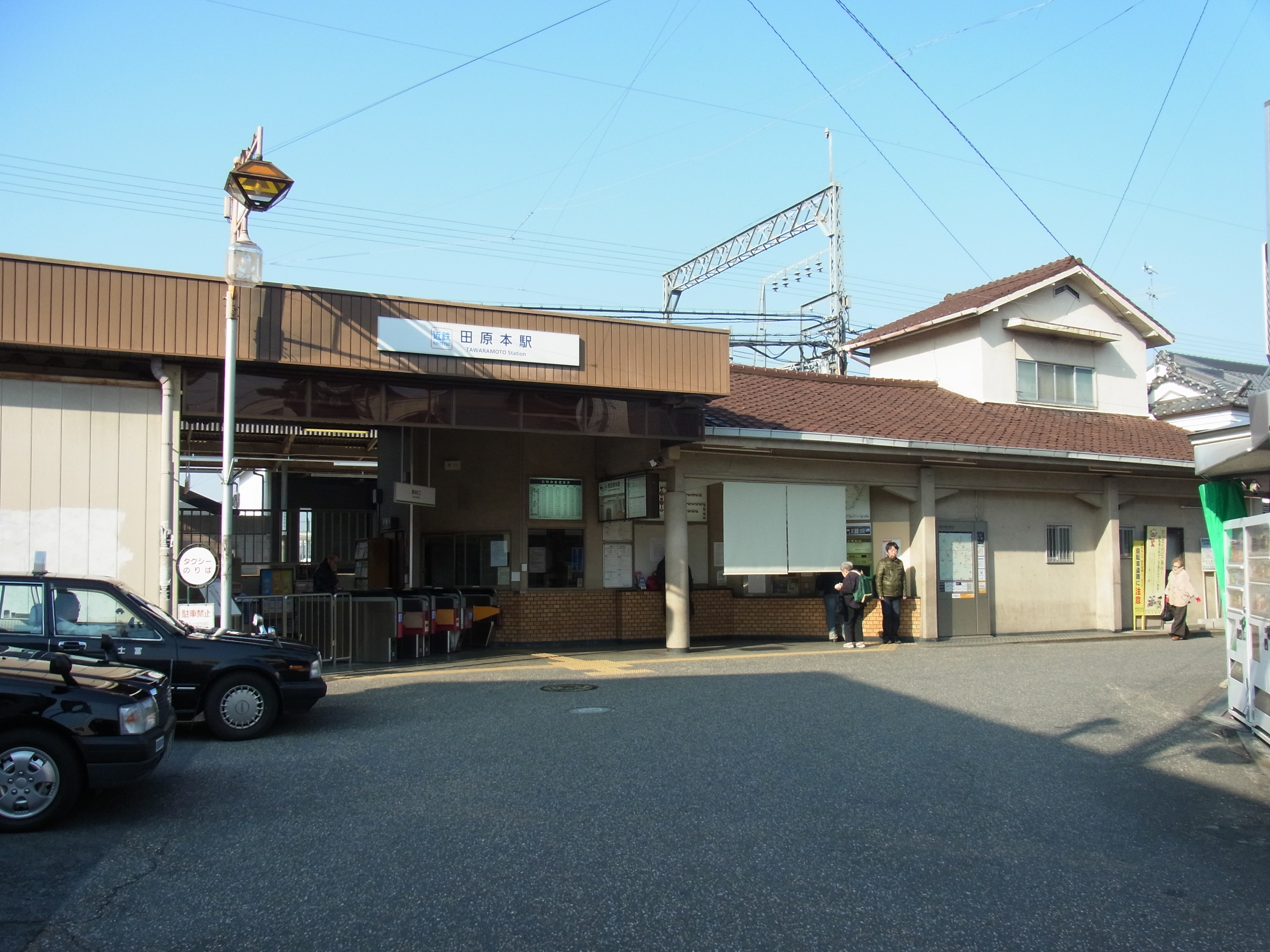
East Exit

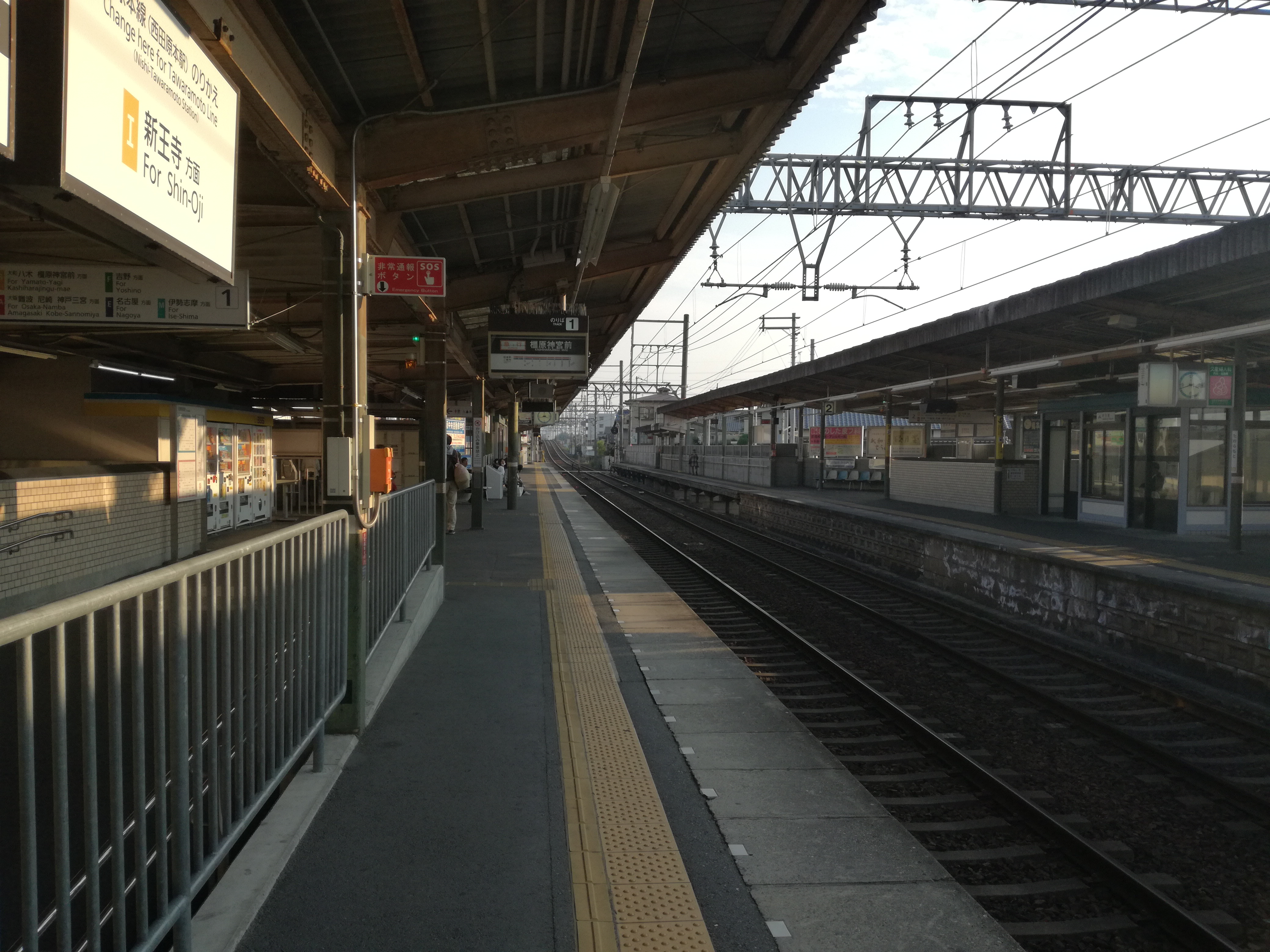
Platform

== History ==
Tawaramoto Station opened on 21 March 1923 on the Osaka Electric Tramway Unebi Line when the line was extended from Hirahata to Kashiharajingu-mae Station.On 15 March 1941, the line merged with the Sangu Express Railway and became the Kansai Express Railway's Osaka Line. . This line was merged with the Nankai Electric Railway on 1 June 1944 to form Kintetsu.The station was renamed as Kinki Nippon Tawaramoto Station, and renamed to its current name in 1964,

== Passenger statistics ==
In fiscal 2019, the station was used by an average of 4745 passengers daily (boarding passengers only).

== Surrounding area ==
- Tawaramoto Town Hall
- Nara Prefectural Isokino High School

== See also ==
- List of railway stations in Japan
