= Kujō Station (Nara) =

Railway station in Yamatokōriyama, Nara Prefecture, Japan

Kujō Station 九条駅
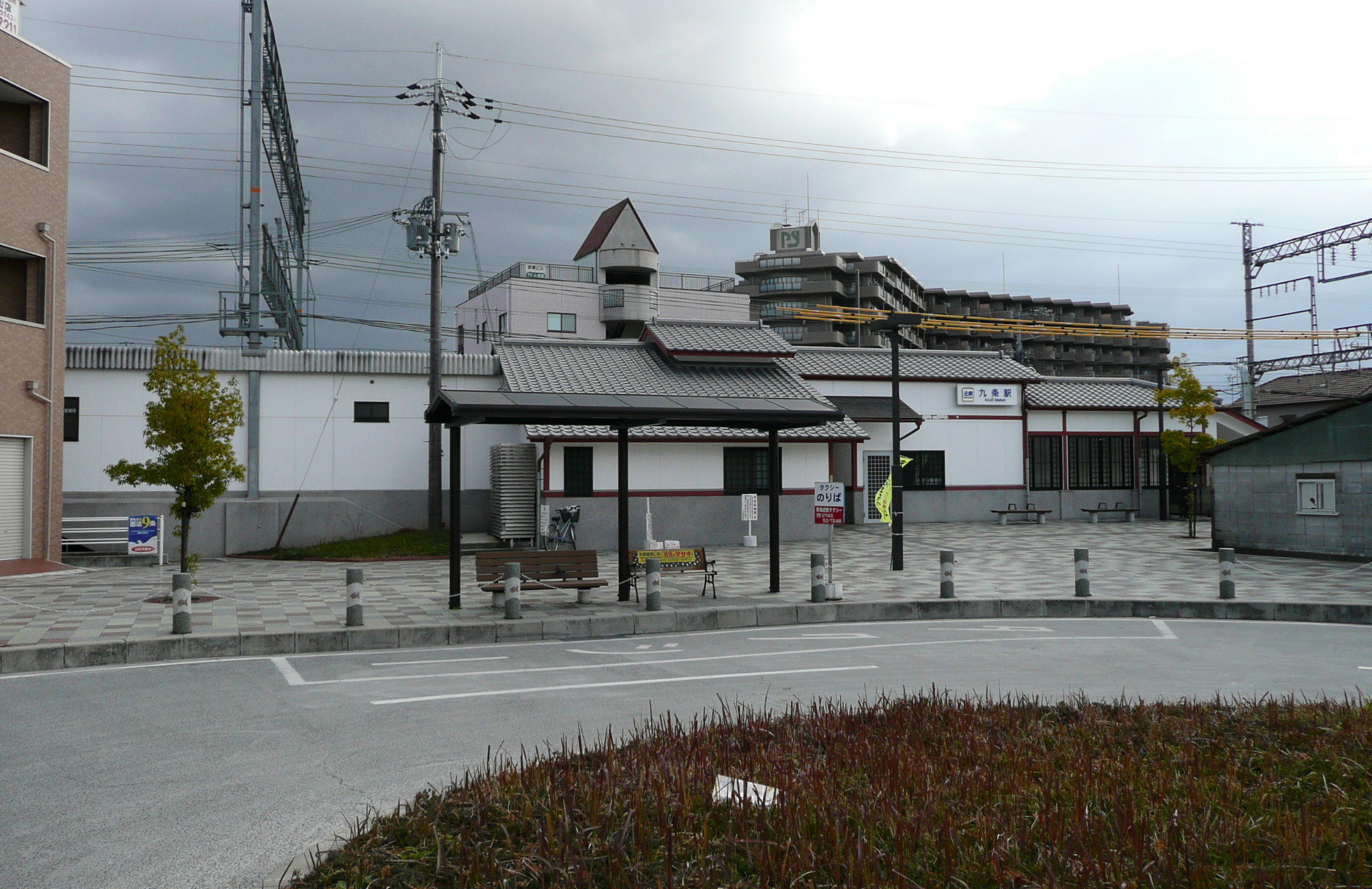
- The west entrance of Kintetsu Kōriyama Station—May 2007

General information
- Location: 375, Aza-deguchi, Kujochō, Yamatokōriyama-shi, Nara-ken 639-1001; Japan
- Coordinates: 34°39′34″N 135°46′59″E
- System: Kintetsu Railway commuter rail station
- Owner: Kintetsu Railway
- Operator: Kintetsu Railway
- Line: B Kashihara Line
- Distance: 4.0 km (2.5 miles) from Yamato-Saidaiji
- Platforms: 2 side platforms
- Tracks: 2
- Train operators: Kintetsu Railway
- Bus stands: 1
- Connections: Yamatokoriyama City Community Bus: Genki-heiwa-go

Construction
- Structure type: At grade
- Parking: None
- Cycle facilities: Available
- Accessible: Yes (2 elevators for the ticket gate, 2 elevators for the platforms, and 1 bathroom)

Other information
- Station code: B29
- Website: www.kintetsu.co.jp/station/station_info/en_station06008.html

History
- Opened: 1 April 1921
- Rebuilt: 2002

Passengers
- FY2020: 2321 daily
Services
Preceding station	Kintetsu Railway	Following station
B Kashihara Line
Nishinokyō towards Kyōto, Shin-Tanabe or Yamato-Saidaiji	Local	Kintetsu-Kōriyama towards Kashiharajingū-mae or Tenri
Location
- Location within Nara Prefecture Location within Japan

Kujō Station (九条駅, Kujō eki) is a passenger railway station located in the city of Yamatokōriyama, Nara Prefecture, Japan. It is operated by the private transportation company, Kintetsu Railway.

== Lines ==
Kujō Station is served by the Kashihara Line and is 4.0 kilometers from the starting point of the line at Yamato-Saidaiji and 38.6 kilometers from Kyoto.

== Layout ==
The station is an above-ground station with two side platforms and two tracks. The effective length of the platform is for four cars. The ticket gates and concourse are underground, while the platform is above ground. There are two station entrances and ticket gates, one on the east side and one on the west side. There are two elevators. The station is unattended.

=== Platforms ===
1	■ Kashihara Line	for Yamato-Yagi and Kashihara-Jingumae
2	■ Kashihara Line	for Yamato-Saidaiji and Kyoto

== History ==
Kujō Station was opened on April 1, 1921 on the Osaka Electric Tramway Unebi Line. On 15 March 1941, the line merged with the Sangu Express Railway and became the Kansai Express Railway, which was merged with the Nankai Electric Railway on 1 June 1944 to form Kintetsu.

== Passenger statistics ==
In fiscal 2019, the station was used by an average of 2,321 passengers daily (boarding passengers only).

== Surrounding area ==
- Kujo Sports Center
- Nara Prefectural Nara Special Needs School

== See also ==
- List of railway stations in Japan
