= Yūzaki Station =

Railway station in Kawanishi, Nara Prefecture, Japan

Yūzaki Station 結崎駅
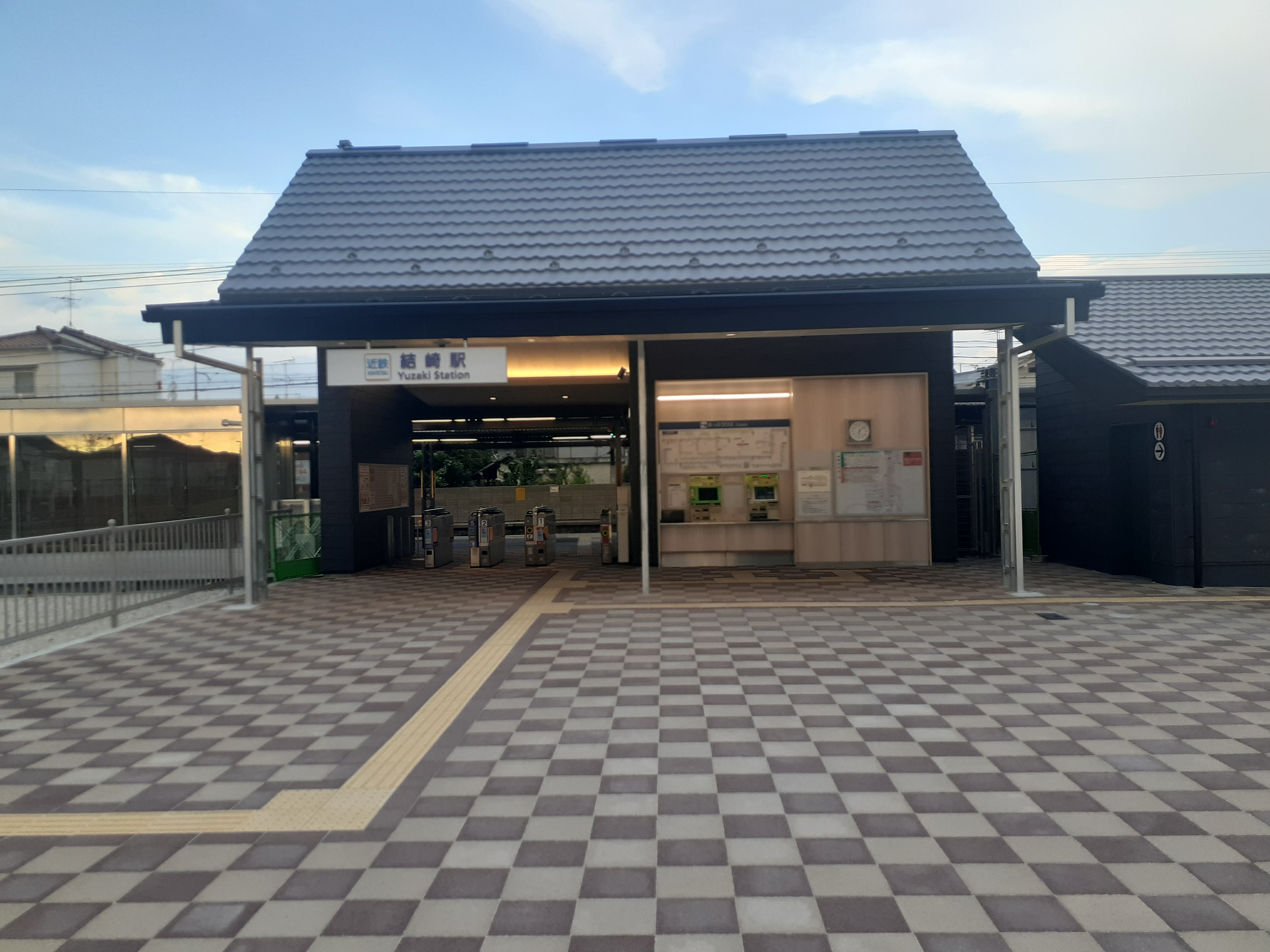
- Yūzaki Station west enterace (Aug. 2022)

General information
- Location: 584, Yūzaki deyashiki, Kawanishi-cho, Shiki-gun, Nara-ken 636-0202; Japan
- Coordinates: 34°35′04″N 135°47′05″E
- System: Kintetsu Railway commuter rail station
- Owner: Kintetsu Railway
- Operator: Kintetsu Railway
- Line: B Kashihara Line
- Distance: 12.4 km (7.7 miles)
- Platforms: 2 side platforms
- Tracks: 2
- Train operators: Kintetsu Railway
- Connections: Town Circular Community Bus: Kawanishi Cosmos-gō Handa Course; Town Circular Community Bus: Kawanishi Cosmos-gō Hota Course

Construction
- Structure type: At grade
- Parking: None
- Cycle facilities: Available
- Accessible: Yes (slopes for each platform)

Other information
- Station code: B34
- Website: www.kintetsu.co.jp/station/station_info/en_station06013.html

History
- Opened: 21 March 1923
- Rebuilt: 1998

Passengers
- 2019: 2113 daily
Services
Preceding station	Kintetsu Railway	Following station
B Kashihara Line
Family-Kōemmae towards Kyōto, Shin-Tanabe or Yamato-Saidaiji	Local	Iwami towards Kashiharajingū-mae
Location

Yūzaki Station (結崎駅, Yūzaki-eki) is a passenger railway station located in the town of Kawanishi, Shiki District, Nara Prefecture, Japan. It is operated by the private transportation company, Kintetsu Railway.

== Line ==
Yūzaki Station is served by the Kashihara Line and is 12.4 kilometers from the starting point of the line at Yamato-Saidaiji and 47.0 kilometers from Kyoto.

== Layout ==
The station is an above-ground station with two opposing side platforms and two tracks. The effective length of the platform is enough for four cars. The station building is on the platform 1 side, and is connected to platform 2 on the opposite side by a level crossing. The station is unattended.

== Platforms ==
1	■ B Kashihara Line	for Yamato-Yagi and Kashihara-Jingumae
2	■ B Kashihara Line	for Yamato-Saidaiji and Kyoto

== History ==
Yūzaki Station was opened 21 March 1923 by the Osaka Electric Tramway as the Unebi Line was extended from Hirahata to Kashiharajingu-mae Station. In 1941 the Osaka Electric Tramway merged with the Sangu Express Railway to form the Kansai Express Railway, which merged with Nankai Railway in 1944 to form Kintetsu.

== Passenger statistics ==
In fiscal 2019, the station was used by an average of 2113 passengers daily (boarding passengers only).

== Surrounding area ==
- Kawanishi Town Office
- Nara Prefectural Nikaido Special Needs School

== See also ==
- List of railway stations in Japan
