= Hirahata Station =

Railway station in Yamatokōriyama, Nara Prefecture, Japan

Hirahata Station 平端駅
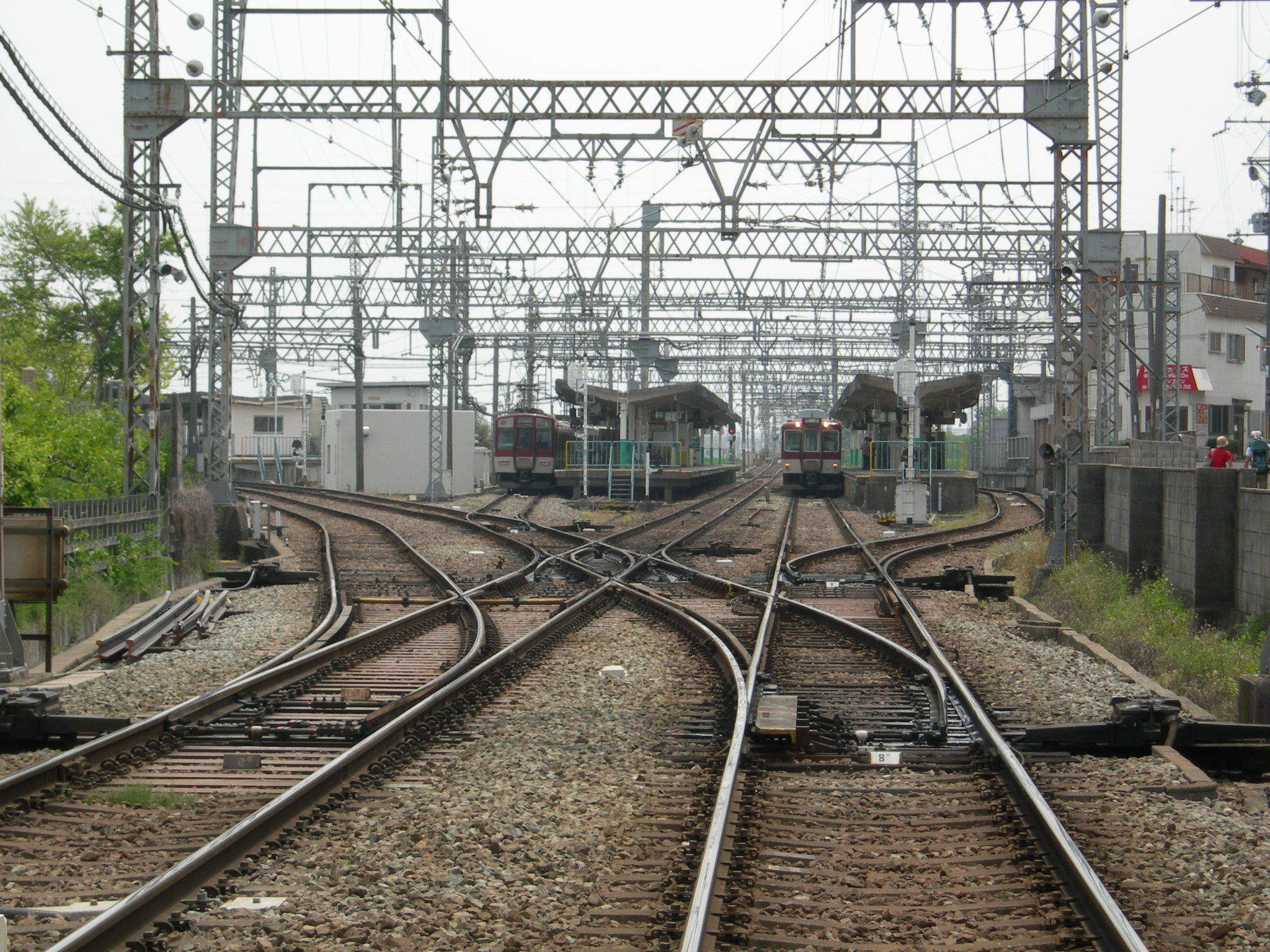
- Hirahata Station

General information
- Location: 51, Shōwa-chō, Yamatokōriyama-shi, Nara-ken 639-1033; Japan
- Coordinates: 34°36′24″N 135°46′58″E
- System: Kintetsu Railway commuter rail station
- Owner: Kintetsu Railway
- Operator: Kintetsu Railway
- Lines: B Kashihara Line; H Tenri Line
- Distance: Kashihara Line: 9.9 km (6.2 miles); Tenri Line: 0 km (0 miles)
- Platforms: 2 island + 2 side platforms
- Tracks: 6
- Train operators: Kintetsu Railway
- Bus stands: 1
- Connections: Ando Town Community Bus: Minami-mawari Route; Ando Town Community Bus: Naka-dōri Route

Construction
- Structure type: At grade
- Parking: None
- Cycle facilities: Available
- Accessible: Yes (2 elavators, 5 escalators, 1 bathroom, and equipped wheelchairs)

Other information
- Station code: B32 H32
- Website: Official website

History
- Opened: 7 February 1915
- Electrified: 1922

Passengers
- 2019: 2310 daily
Services
Preceding station	Kintetsu Railway	Following station
B Kashihara Line
Tsutsui towards Kyōto, Shin-Tanabe or Yamato-Saidaiji	Local	Family-Kōemmae towards Kashiharajingū-mae
Tsutsui towards Kyōto, Shin-Tanabe or Yamato-Saidaiji	Local	through to Tenri Line
Kintetsu-Kōriyama towards Kyōto or Yamato-Saidaiji	Express	Tawaramoto towards Kashiharajingū-mae
Kintetsu-Kōriyama towards Kyōto or Yamato-Saidaiji	Express	through to Tenri Line
H Tenri Line
through to Tenri Line	Local	Nikaidō towards Tenri
Terminus	Local	Nikaidō towards Tenri
through to Tenri Line	Express	Nikaidō towards Tenri
Location
- Location within Nara Prefecture Location within Japan

Hirahata Station (平端駅, Hirahata-eki) is a junction passenger railway station located in the city of Yamatokōriyama, Nara Prefecture, Japan. It is operated by the private transportation company, Kintetsu Railway.

== Lines ==
Hirahara Station is served by the Kashihara Line and is 9.9 kilometers from the starting point of the line at Yamato-Saidaiji and 44.5 kilometers from Kyoto. It is also the terminus of the 4.5 kilometer branch line to Tenri.

== Layout ==
The station is an above-ground station with two island platforms for the Kashihara Line, and two opposed side platforms angled 45 degrees for the Tenri Line. The station building is on the west side of the station and is connected to each platform by an underground passage. There are escalators from the underground passage to each platform and the station building (ticket gates).

=== Platforms ===
1	■ Tenri Line	for Tenri
2	■ Kashihara Line	for Yamato-Saidaiji and Kyoto
2	■ Tenri Line	for Tenri
3,4	■ Kashihara Line	for Yamato-Yagi and Kashihara-Jingumae
5,6	■ Kashihara Line	for Yamato-Saidaiji and Kyoto

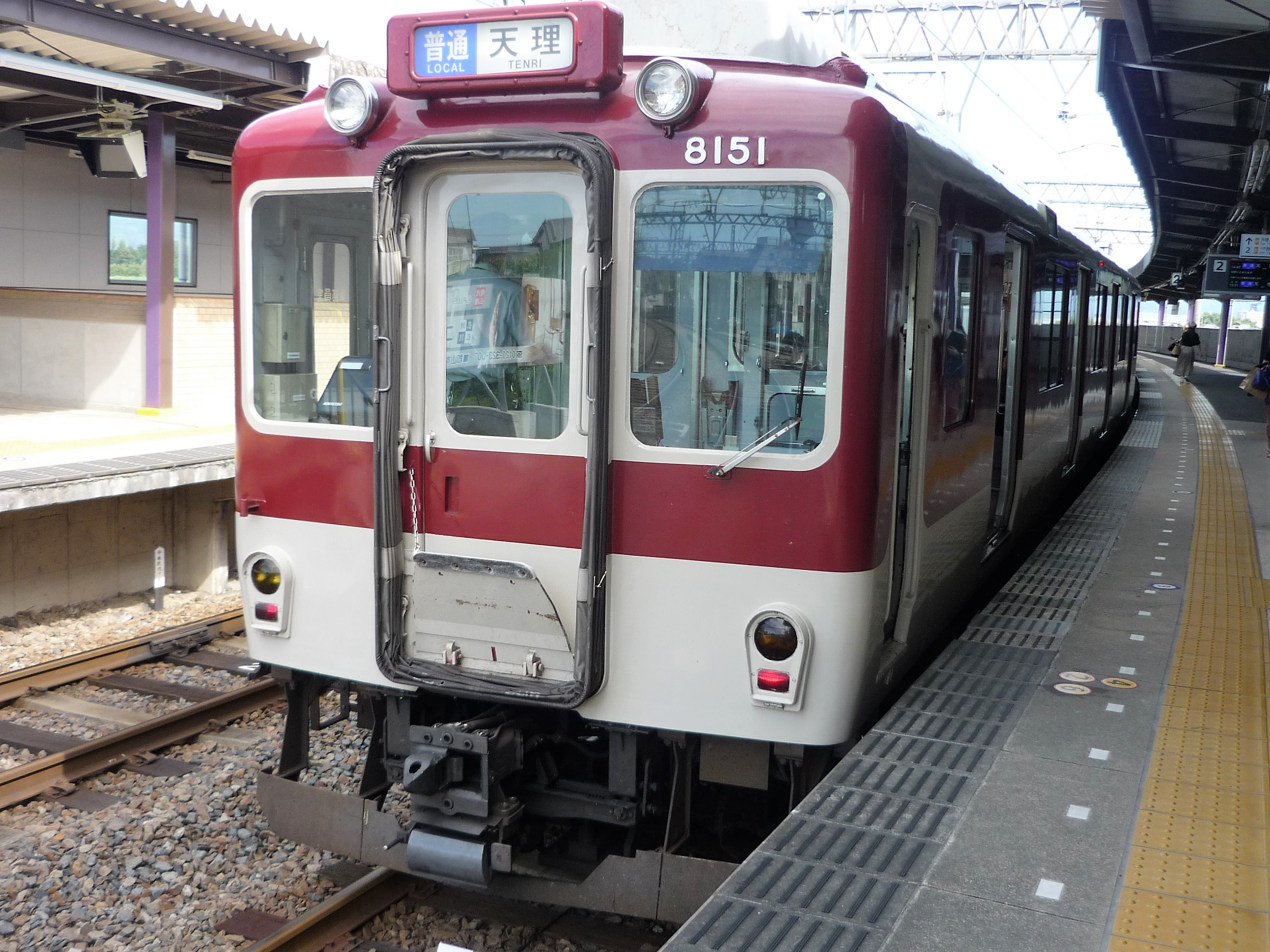
Kintetsu 8600 series 8151 at Hirahata Station

Platform layout

== History ==
Hirahata Station was opened on February 7, 1915 as a station on the Tenri Light Railway. The company was acquired by the Osaka Electric Tramway in 1921, and the rail gauge was widened to 1435 mm, with the station serving as the terminus of the Uneme Line. In 1923, the line was extended to Kashiharajingū-mae. On 15 March 1941, the line merged with the Sangu Express Railway and became the Kansai Express Railway, which was merged with the Nankai Electric Railway on 1 June 1944 to form Kintetsu.

== Passenger statistics ==
In fiscal 2019, the station was used by an average of 2310 passengers daily (boarding passengers only).

== Surrounding area ==
- Showa Industrial Park
- Yamatokoriyama City Showa Elementary School

== See also ==
- List of railway stations in Japan
