= Kintetsu-Kōriyama Station =

Railway station in Yamatokōriyama, Nara Prefecture, Japan

Kintetsu Kōriyama Station 近鉄郡山駅
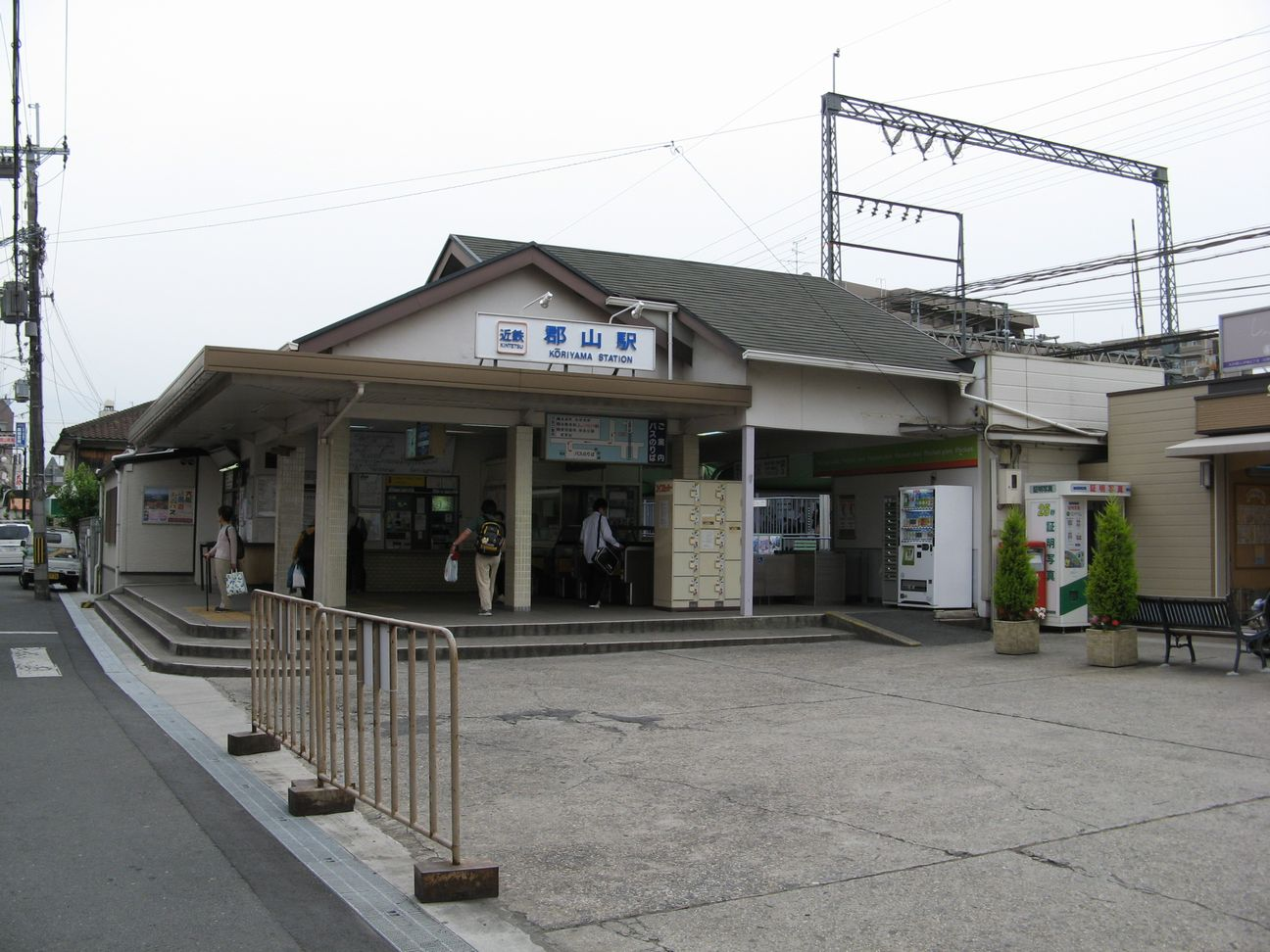
- The entrance of Kintetsu Kōriyama Station—May 2007

General information
- Location: 232, Minamikōriyamachō, Yamatokōriyama-shi, Nara-ken 639-1007; Japan
- Coordinates: 34°38′46″N 135°46′51″E
- System: Kintetsu Railway commuter rail station
- Owner: Kintetsu Railway
- Operator: Kintetsu Railway
- Line: B Kashihara Line
- Distance: 5.5 km (3.4 miles) from Yamato-Saidaiji
- Platforms: 2 side platforms
- Tracks: 2
- Train operators: Kintetsu Railway
- Bus stands: 3
- Connections: Keisei Bus / Nara Kotsu Bus Lines: Yamato-gō Tokyo Disney Resort / Yokohama—Nara Route; Nara Kotsu Bus Lines: 11・20・24・38・50・51・52・71・72・97・98・Bun (School); Yamatokoriyama City Community Bus: Genki-jōkamachi-gō・Genki-heiwa-gō・Genki-harumichi-gō

Construction
- Structure type: At grade
- Parking: Available
- Cycle facilities: Available
- Accessible: Yes (1 accessible slope for the east ticket gate, 2 slopes for the platforms, 1 bathroom, and equipped wheelchairs)

Other information
- Station code: B30
- Website: Official website

History
- Opened: 1 April 1921
- Former names: Kinki-Nippon Kōriyama (1944—1970); Kankyū Kōriyama (1941—1944); Daiki Kōriyama (1928—1941)

Passengers
- FY2019: 9675 daily
Services
Preceding station	Kintetsu Railway	Following station
B Kashihara Line
Kujō towards Kyōto, Shin-Tanabe or Yamato-Saidaiji	Local	Tsutsui towards Kashiharajingū-mae or Tenri
Nishinokyō Off-peak only (M—F: 10—16, W/E: 9—18) towards Kyōto or Yamato-Saidaiji	Express	Hirahata towards Kashiharajingū-mae or Tenri
Yamato-Saidaiji towards Kyōto or Yamato-Saidaiji	Express	Hirahata towards Kashiharajingū-mae or Tenri
Location
- Location within Nara Prefecture Location within Japan

Kintetsu Kōriyama Station (近鉄郡山駅, Kintetsu Kōriyama-eki) is a passenger railway station located in the city of Yamatokōriyama, Nara Prefecture, Japan. It is operated by the private transportation company, Kintetsu Railway.

== Lines ==
Kintetsu Kōriyama Station is served by the Kashihara Line and is 5.5 kilometers from the starting point of the line at Yamato-Saidaiji and 40.1 kilometers from Kyoto.

== Layout ==
The station is an above-ground station with two side platforms connected by a level crossing. The effective length of the platform is for six cars. The station building is on the platform 1 side, and there is an unstaffed automatic ticket gate on the platform 2.

=== Platforms ===
1	■ Kashihara Line	for Yamato-Yagi and Kashihara-Jingumae
2	■ Kashihara Line	for Yamato-Saidaiji and Kyoto

== History ==
The station opened in 1921 on the Unebi Line of Osaka Electric Tramway, a predecessor of the Kintetsu Railway.

== History ==
Kintetsu-Kōriyama Station was opened on April 1, 1921 as Kōriyama Station (郡山駅) on the Osaka Electric Tramway Unebi Line. In 1928, its name was changed to Daiki Kōriyama Station (大軌郡山駅). On 15 March 1941, the line merged with the Sangu Express Railway and became the Kansai Express Railway. The station name became Kankyu Kōriyama Station (関急郡山駅) which was merged with the Nankai Electric Railway on 1 June 1944 to form Kintetsu. The station name change again to Kinki Nihon Kōriyama Station (近畿日本郡山駅), which was shortened to its present name on Match 1, 1970.

== Passenger statistics ==
In fiscal 2019, the station was used by an average of 9675 passengers daily (boarding passengers only).

== Surrounding area ==
- Yamatokōriyama City Hall
- Kōriyama Castle
- Nara Prefectural Koriyama High School
- Nara National College of Technology

== See also ==
- List of railway stations in Japan
