= Tsutsui Station (Nara) =

Railway station in Yamatokōriyama, Nara Prefecture, Japan

Tsutsui Station 筒井駅
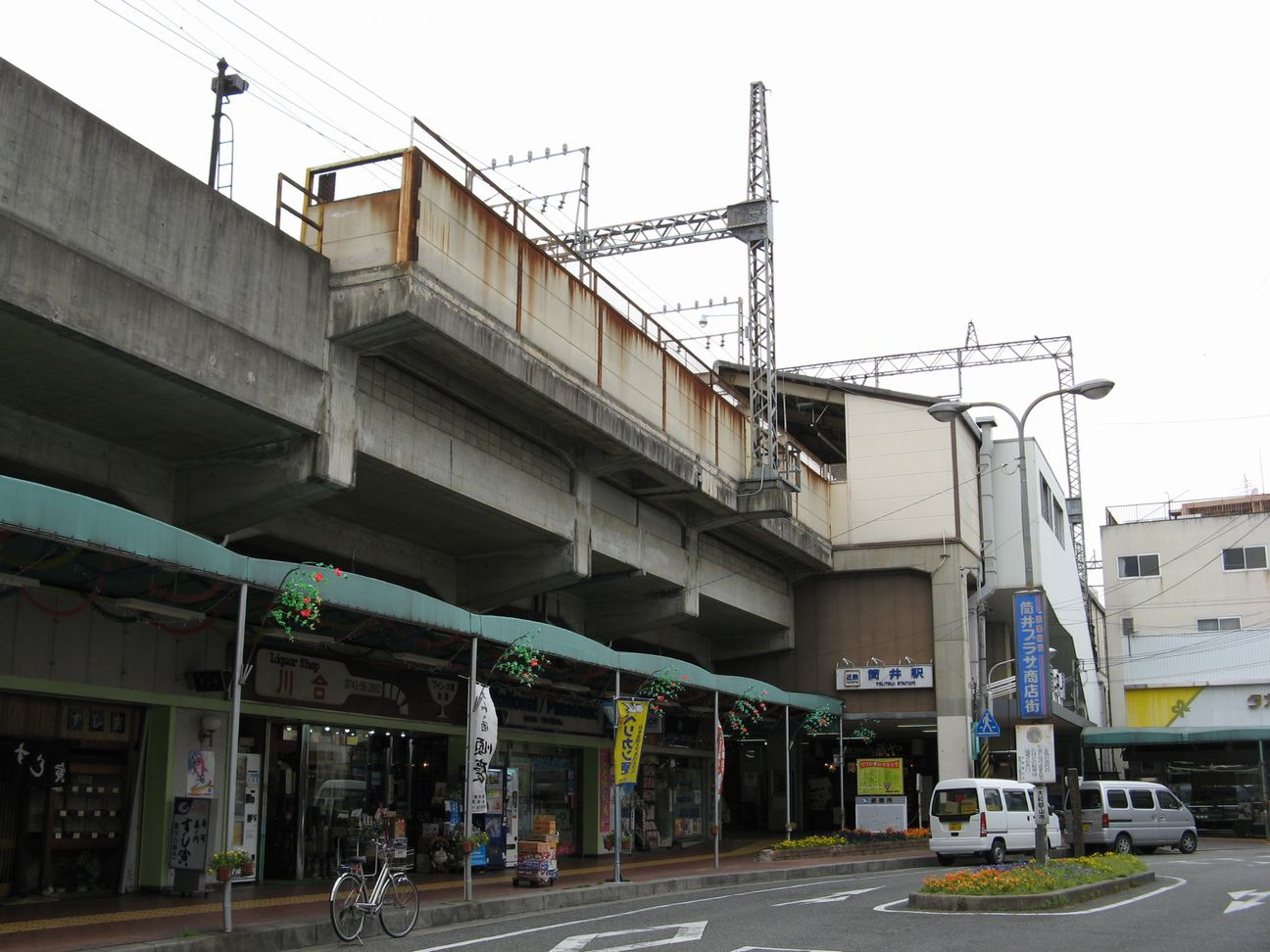
- Tsutsui Station in May 2007

General information
- Location: 640, Tsutsuichō Hachiōji, Yamatokōriyama-shi, Nara-ken 639-1123; Japan
- Coordinates: 34°37′13″N 135°46′50″E
- System: Kintetsu Railway commuter rail station
- Owner: Kintetsu Railway
- Operator: Kintetsu Railway
- Line: B Kashihara Line
- Distance: 8.4 km (5.2 miles) from Yamato-Saidaiji
- Platforms: 2 side platforms
- Tracks: 2
- Train operators: Kintetsu Railway
- Bus stands: 1
- Connections: Nara Kotsu Bus Lines: 63・92

Construction
- Structure type: Elevated
- Parking: None
- Cycle facilities: Available
- Accessible: Yes (1 elavator, 2 escalators, 1 bathroom, and equipped wheelchairs)

Other information
- Station code: B31
- Website: www.kintetsu.co.jp/station/station_info/en_station06010.html

History
- Opened: 1 April 1921
- Rebuilt: 1977

Passengers
- 2019: 4130 daily
Services
Preceding station	Kintetsu Railway	Following station
B Kashihara Line
Kintetsu-Kōriyama towards Kyōto, Shin-Tanabe or Yamato-Saidaiji	Local	Hirahata towards Kashiharajingū-mae or Tenri
Location
- Location within Nara Prefecture Location within Japan

Tsutsui Station (筒井駅, Tsutsui-eki) is a passenger railway station located in the city of Yamatokōriyama, Nara Prefecture, Japan. It is operated by the private transportation company, Kintetsu Railway.

== Lines ==
Tsutsui Station is served by the Kashihara Line and is 8.4 kilometers from the starting point of the line at Yamato-Saidaiji and 43.0 kilometers from Kyoto.

== Layout ==
The station is an elevated station (the only one on the Kashihara Line) with two opposing side platforms and two tracks. The effective length of the platform is for four cars. The ticket gates are on the first floor, the concourse is on the mezzanine level, and the platform is on the second floor. There is only one ticket gate.

=== Platforms ===
1	■ Kashihara Line	for Yamato-Yagi and Kashihara-Jingumae
2	■ Kashihara Line	for Yamato-Saidaiji and Kyoto

== History ==
Tsutsui Station was opened on April 1, 1921 on the Osaka Electric Tramway Unebi Line. On 15 March 1941, the line merged with the Sangu Express Railway and became the Kansai Express Railway. The station name became Kankyu Kōriyama Station (関急郡山駅) which was merged with the Nankai Electric Railway on 1 June 1944 to form Kintetsu.

== Passenger statistics ==
In fiscal 2019, the station was used by an average of 4130 passengers daily (boarding passengers only).

== Surrounding area ==
- Nara Prefectural Yamato Chuo High School
- Nara Prefectural School for the Blind, Nara Prefectural School for the Deaf
- Showa Industrial Park

== See also ==
- List of railway stations in Japan
