= Family-Kōemmae Station =

Railway station in Yamatokōriyama, Nara Prefecture, Japan

Family-Kōemmae Station ファミリー公園前駅
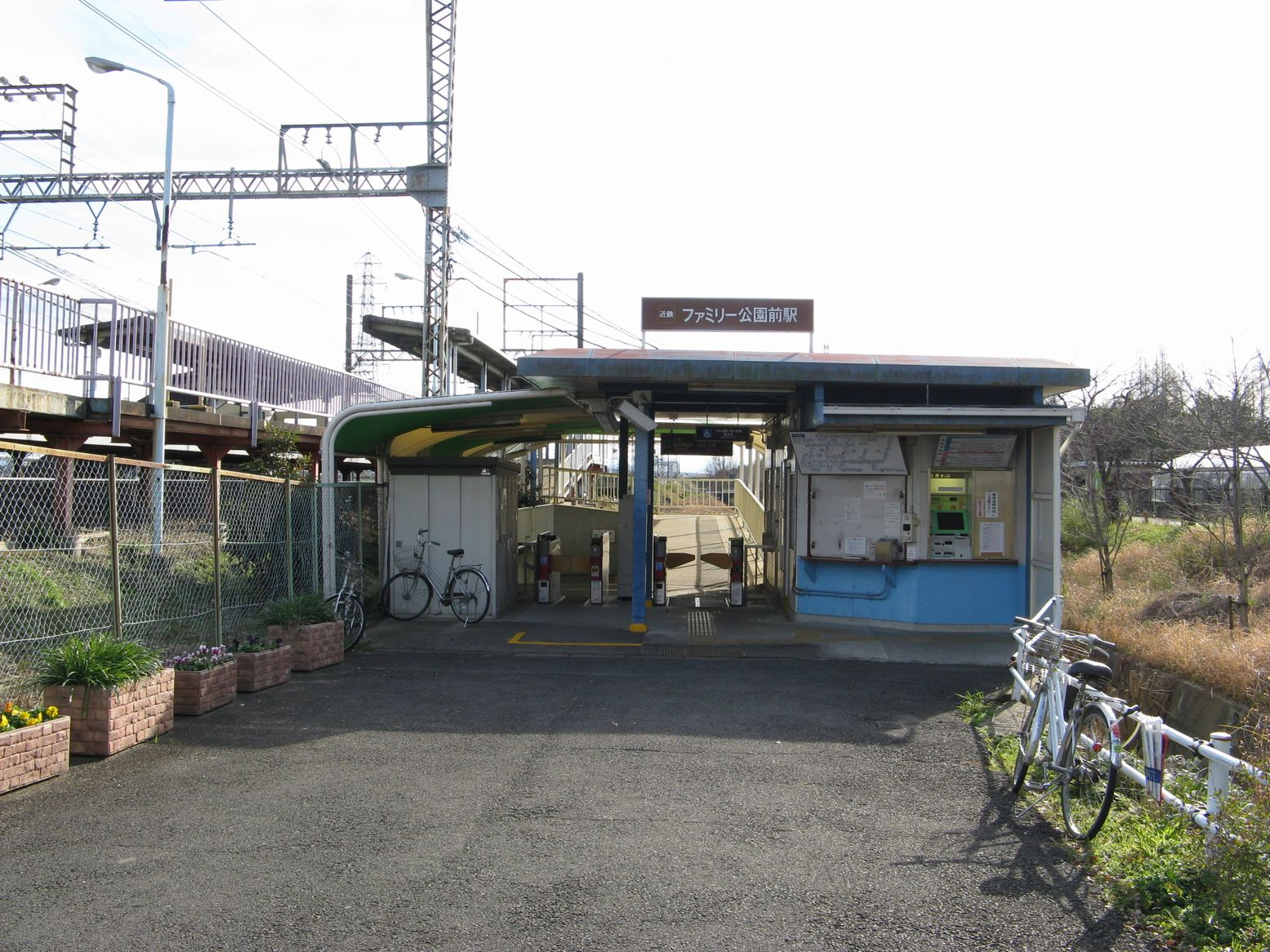
- Family-Kōemmae Station

General information
- Location: 339-2, Miyadochō, Yamatokōriyama-shi, Nara-ken 639-1126; Japan
- Coordinates: 34°35′53″N 135°47′06″E
- System: Kintetsu Railway commuter rail station
- Owner: Kintetsu Railway
- Operator: Kintetsu Railway
- Line: B Kashihara Line
- Distance: 10.9 km (6.8 miles) from Yamato-Saidaiji
- Platforms: 2 side platforms
- Tracks: 2
- Train operators: Kintetsu Railway

Construction
- Structure type: At grade
- Parking: None
- Cycle facilities: None
- Accessible: 1 slope

Other information
- Status: Unstaffed
- Station code: B33
- Website: Official website

History
- Opened: 1 July 1979

Passengers
- FY2019: 333 daily
Services
Preceding station	Kintetsu Railway	Following station
B Kashihara Line
Hirahata towards Kyōto, Shin-Tanabe or Yamato-Saidaiji	Local	Yūzaki towards Kashiharajingū-mae
Location
- Location within Nara Prefecture Location within Japan

Family-Kōemmae Station (ファミリー公園前駅, Famirīkōenmae eki) is a passenger railway station located in the city of Yamatokōriyama, Nara Prefecture, Japan. It is operated by the private transportation company, Kintetsu Railway.

== Lines ==
Family-Kōemmae Station is served by the Kashihara Line and is 10.9 kilometers from the starting point of the line at Yamato-Saidaiji and 45.5 kilometers from Kyoto.

== Layout ==
The station is an above-ground station with two opposing platforms and two tracks. The platform is built on an embankment, and the station building is at ground level on the platform 2 side. The station is unattended.

=== Platforms ===
1	■ Kashihara Line	for Yamato-Yagi and Kashihara-Jingumae
2	■ Kashihara Line	for Yamato-Saidaiji and Kyoto

== History ==
Family-Kōemmae Station was opened on July 1, 1979.

== Passenger statistics ==
In fiscal 2019, the station was used by an average of 333 passengers daily (boarding passengers only).

== Surrounding area ==
- Mahoroba Health Park

== See also ==
- List of railway stations in Japan
