= Yamatokōriyama =

Yamatokōriyama 大和郡山市
- City
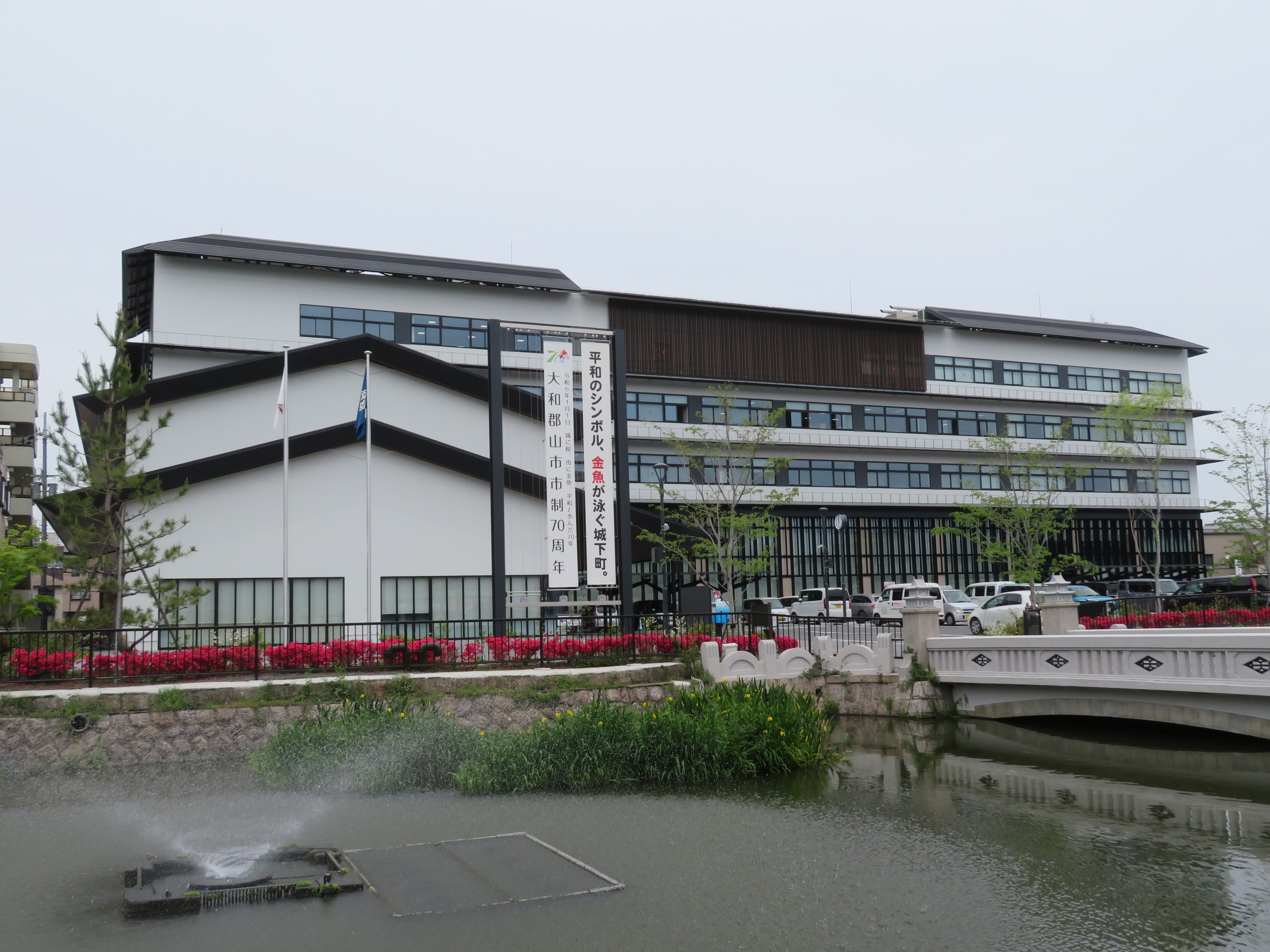
- Yamatokōriyama City Hall

- Flag Emblem
- Location of Yamatokōriyama in Nara Prefecture

- Location in Japan
- Coordinates: 34°38′58″N 135°46′58″E
- Country: Japan
- Region: Kansai
- Prefecture: Nara

Government
  - Mayor: Kiyoshi Ueda

Area
  - Total: 42.69 km^{2} (16.48 sq mi)

Population (30 September 2024)
  - Total: 82,731
  - Density: 1,938/km^{2} (5,019/sq mi)
- Time zone: UTC+09:00 (JST)
- City hall address: 248-4 Kitakōriyama-chō, Yamatokōriyama-shi, Nara-ken 639–1198
- Website: Official website
- Symbols
- Flower: Chrysanthemum; Prunus jamasakura
- Tree: Japanese Black Pine, Peking Willow

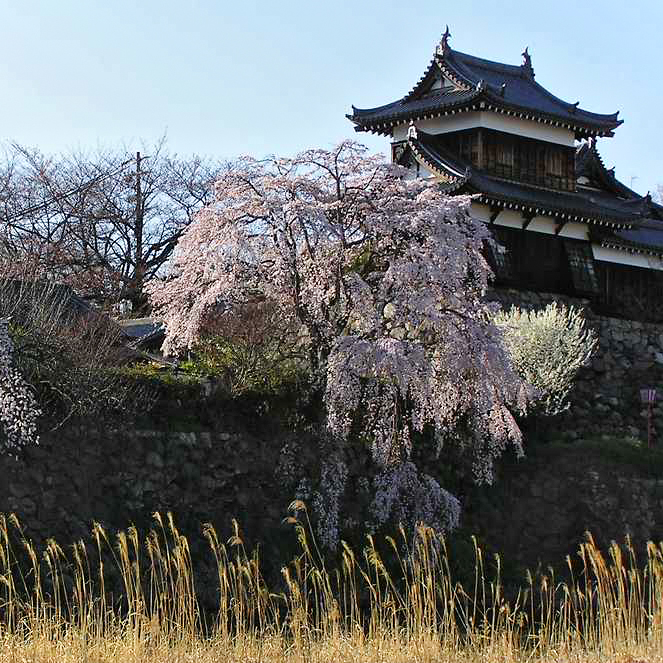
Kōriyama Castle

Yamatokōriyama (大和郡山市, Yamatokōriyama-shi) is a city in Nara Prefecture, Japan. As of 30 September 2024, the city had an estimated population of 82,731 in 39,628 households, and a population density of 1,900 persons per km^{2}. The total area of the city is 42.69 km^{2} (16.48 sq mi).

== Geography ==
Yamatokōriyama is located in the northern part of the Nara Basin, with the Saho River and the Tomio River flowing through the city from north-to-south and merging into the Yamato River that flows westwards towards Osaka. The city area is mostly flat, but west of the Tomio River the Yata Hills make the land more undulating. There are also many ponds within the city, which were traditionally used as irrigation reservoirs or goldfish farms.

=== Neighboring municipalities ===
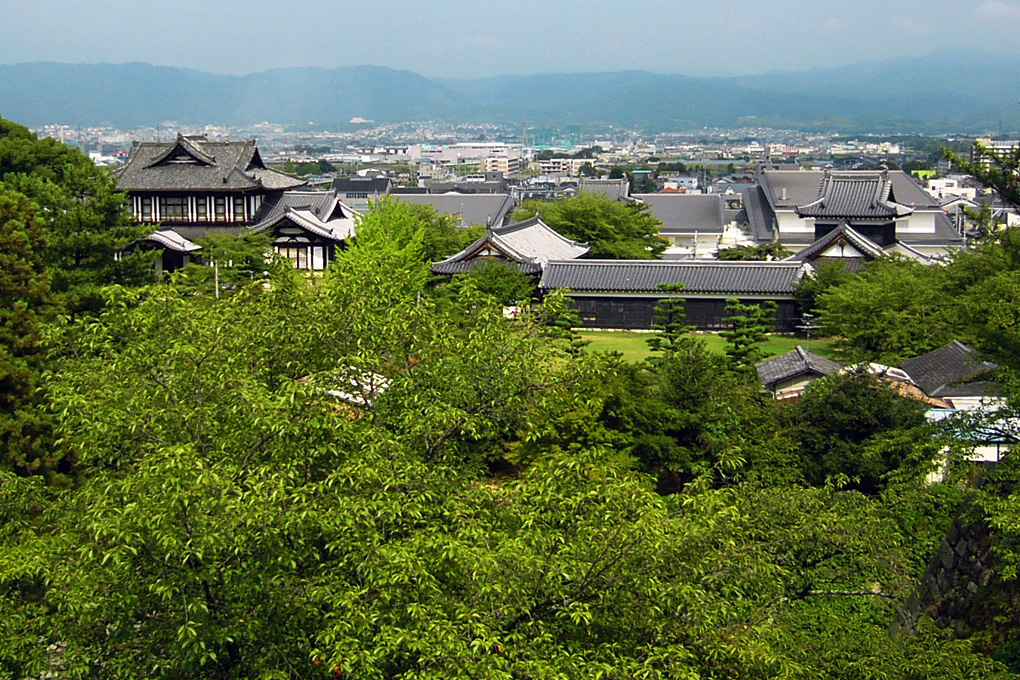
Town of Yamatokōriyama

Nara Prefecture

- Ando
- Ikaruga
- Ikoma
- Kawanishi
- Nara
- Tenri

=== Climate ===
Yamatokōriyama has a humid subtropical climate (Köppen Cfa) characterized by warm summers and cool winters with light to no snowfall. The average annual temperature in Yamatokōriyama is 14.1 °C. The average annual rainfall is 1356 mm with September as the wettest month. The temperatures are highest on average in August, at around 26.1 °C, and lowest in January, at around 2.6 °C.

=== Demographics ===
Per Japanese census data, the population of Yamatokōriyama is as shown below

Historical population
Year	Pop.	±%
1940	35,214	—
1950	43,559	+23.7%
1960	43,093	−1.1%
1970	57,456	+33.3%
1980	81,266	+41.4%
1990	92,949	+14.4%
2000	94,188	+1.3%
2010	89,023	−5.5%
2020	83,285	−6.4%

== History ==
The area of Yamatokōriyama was part of ancient Yamato Province, and many local neighborhood names appear in the early Heian period Engishiki records. The present day city center began as a castle town outside the gates of Kōriyama Castle during Sengoku period under the rule of Tsutsui Junkei and Toyotomi Hidenaga. During the Edo Period, it developed into a market town under Kōriyama Domain, which was ruled by a succession of fudai daimyō clans, notably the Yanagisawa clan although a portion of what is now within the city borders was part of the smaller Koizumi Domain ruled by the Katagiri clan. After the Meiji restoration, the town of Kōriyama and villages of Tsutsui, Yata, Honda, Hirahata, Jido, Heiwa, and Katagiri were established with the creation of the modern municipalities system on 1 April 1889. Kōriyama annexed Tsutsui on 10 March 1941, and the remaining villages (with the exception of Katagiri) on 10 December 1953 and was raised to city status on 1 January 1954, becoming the city of Yamatokōriyama. Katagiri was annexed on 31 March 1957.

== Government ==
Yamatokōriyama has a mayor-council form of government with a directly elected mayor and a unicameral city council of 20 members. Yamatokōriyama contributes three members to the Nara Prefectural Assembly. In terms of national politics, the city is part of the Nara 2nd district of the lower house of the Diet of Japan.

== Economy ==
The city produces various agricultural, commercial, and factory products. For example, cultivation of rice and fresh vegetables such as strawberries and tomatoes is thriving.

A large shopping mall on the edge of the city and many large shopping centres in the suburbs are sustaining commercial industry. The "Showa Kogyo Danchi", industrial zone, located in the southern part of the city is the largest in Nara Prefecture and employs a large number of workers. Recently, the numbers of laborers from Brazil and Asian countries such as Vietnam and Indonesia working there is on the increase.

Yamatokoriyama is well known for the cultivation of goldfish, a motif widely seen around the city. In the Koriyama Castle site area, the original stone wall has remained intact for nearly 400 years, and the castle draws large numbers of visitors to the "Oshiro Matsuri" festival, which is held every year in the spring when the cherry blossoms are in full bloom.

== Education ==
Yamatokōriyama has 11 public elementary schools and five public junior high schools operated by the city government and three public high schools operated by the Nara Prefectural Board of Education. The prefecture also operates one special education school, which specializes on education for the deaf. There is also one private junior high school.

== Transportation ==
=== Railways ===
JR West - Yamatoji Line

Q Kōriyama - Yamato-Koizumi

Kintetsu Railway - Kashihara Line

Kujō - Kintetsu-Kōriyama - Tsutsui - Hirahata - Family-Kōemmae

Kintetsu Railway - Tenri Line

Hirahata

=== Highways ===
- Nishi-Meihan Expressway
- Keinawa Expressway
- National Route 24
- National Route 25
- National Route 308
- National Route 168

=== Cycling ===
The cycling route from Nara to Asuka designated by Nara Prefecture as Route C7 runs through the city.

== Sister cities ==
Yamatokōriyama has been twinned with Kōfu, Yamanashi, in Japan since 1992. The two cities are twinned because during the Edo period the Yanagisawa family were transferred from Kofu to Yamatokoriyama under Kunigae (国替), a policy in which daimyōs were transferred from one post to the next.

== Local attractions ==
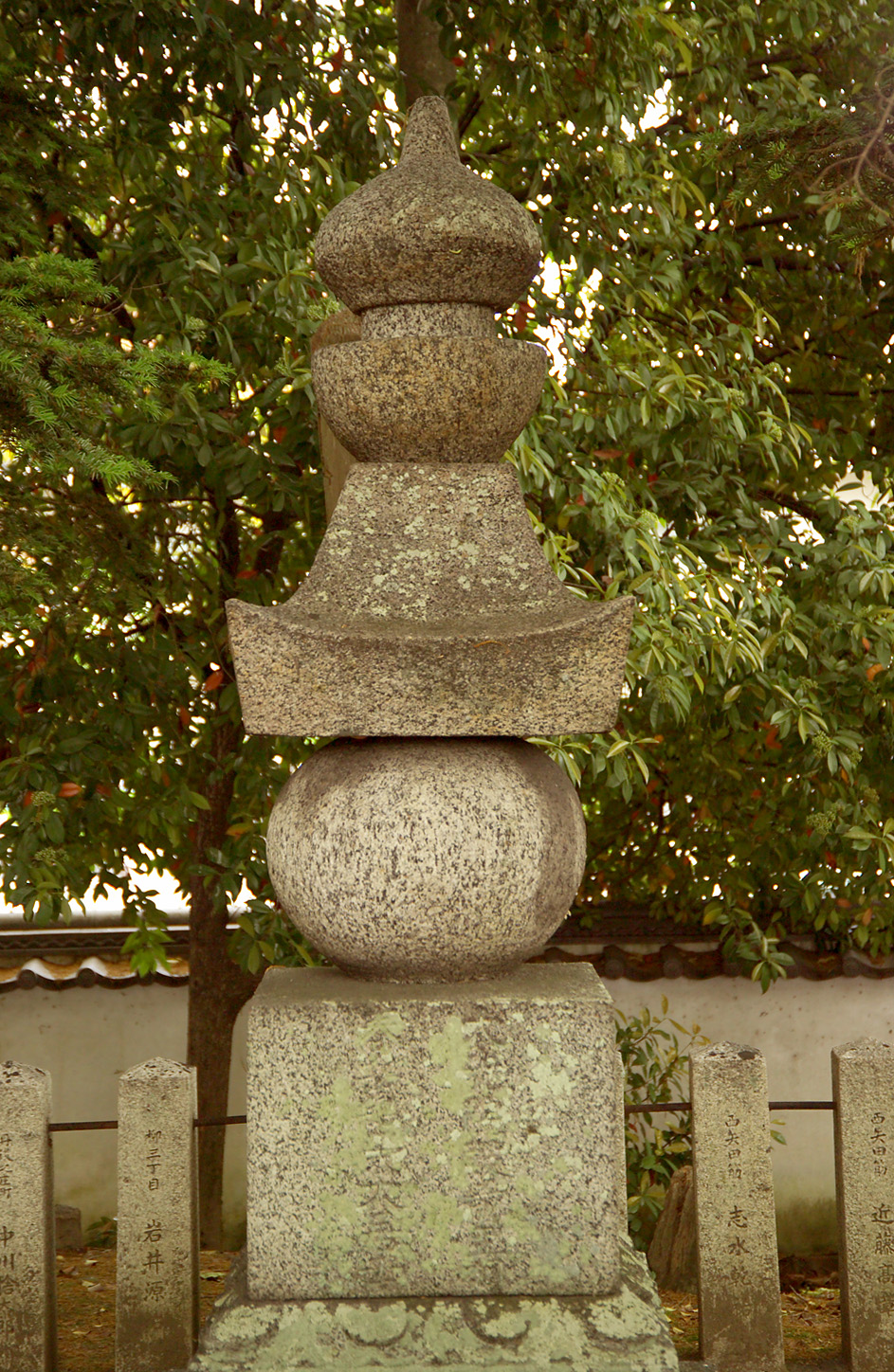
Dainagon-zuka

- Kōriyama Castle, National Historic Site
- Jikō-in, National Historic Site and National Place of Scenic Beauty
- Nara Prefectural Museum of Folklore
- Dainagon-zuka (grave of Toyotomi Hidenaga)
- Meta Shrine

== Notable people from Yamatokōriyama ==
- Yoshinori Fujimoto, Japanese professional golfer (Japan Golf Tour)
- Yoshimoto Ishin, Japanese businessman and Buddhist monk (Jōdo Shinshū)
- Shigeru Joshima, Japanese musician, actor and guitarist, leader and member of the rock band Tokio
- Yoshiyuki Kamei, Japanese professional baseball player for the Yomiuri Giants in Japan's Nippon Professional Baseball
- Kazuyoshi Shirahama, Japanese politician, member of the New Komeito Party, and member of the House of Councillors in the Diet (national legislature)
- Sanae Takaichi, Japanese politician, Prime Minister of Japan, president of the Liberal Democratic Party and member of the House of Representatives
- Yanagisawa Yoriyasu, Japanese samurai of the Edo period
- Shigeko Kagawa, Japanese supercentenarian, former oldest living person in Japan
