= Nara Prefectural Museum of Folklore =

- 奈良県立民俗博物館
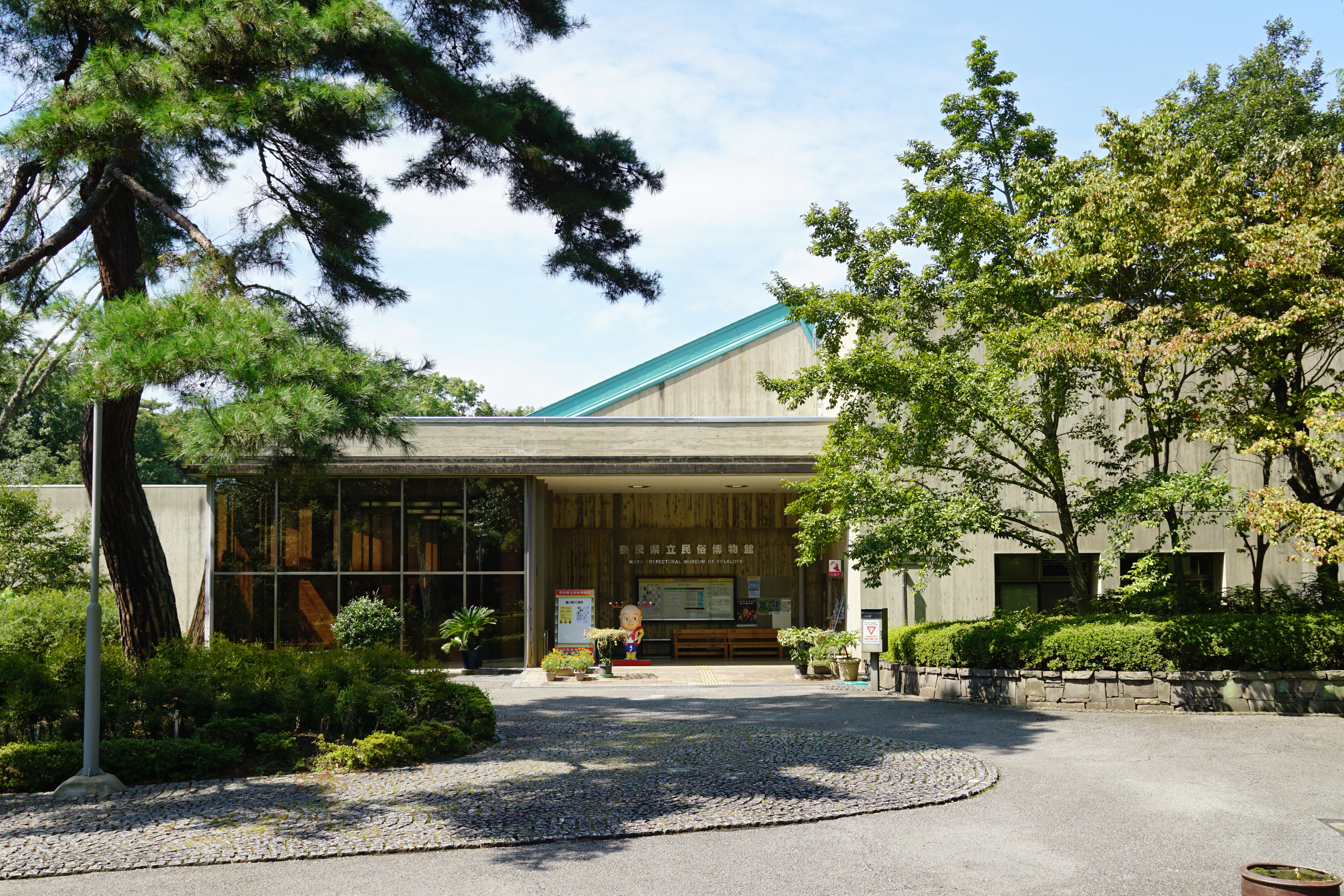

General information
- Location: 545 Yata-chō, Yamatokōriyama, Nara Prefecture, Japan
- Coordinates: 34°39′10″N 135°45′15″E
- Opened: 1974

Website
- Official website

Nara Prefectural Museum of Folklore (奈良県立民俗博物館, Nara Kenritsu Minzoku Hakubutsukan) opened in Yamatokōriyama, Nara Prefecture, Japan, in 1974. Located at the foot of the Yata Hills (矢田丘陵) within the 26.6 hectare Yamato Folk Park (大和民俗公園), the museum collects, preserves, and displays artefacts relating to everyday life in Nara Prefecture from the Edo period to the Shōwa 40s. Among the forty-two thousand objects in the collection are 1,908 relating to forestry in the Yoshino District that have been jointly designated an Important Cultural Property. In the adjacent park are fifteen Edo-period minka, relocated from elsewhere in the prefecture, including the Former Usui Family Residence (旧臼井家住宅) (ICP).

== See also ==
- List of Important Tangible Folk Cultural Properties
- Tomimoto Kenkichi Memorial Museum
- Kōriyama Castle
- Minka
- Mingei
- Nara National Museum
