= Kashihara Line =

Railway line in Nara Prefecture, Japan

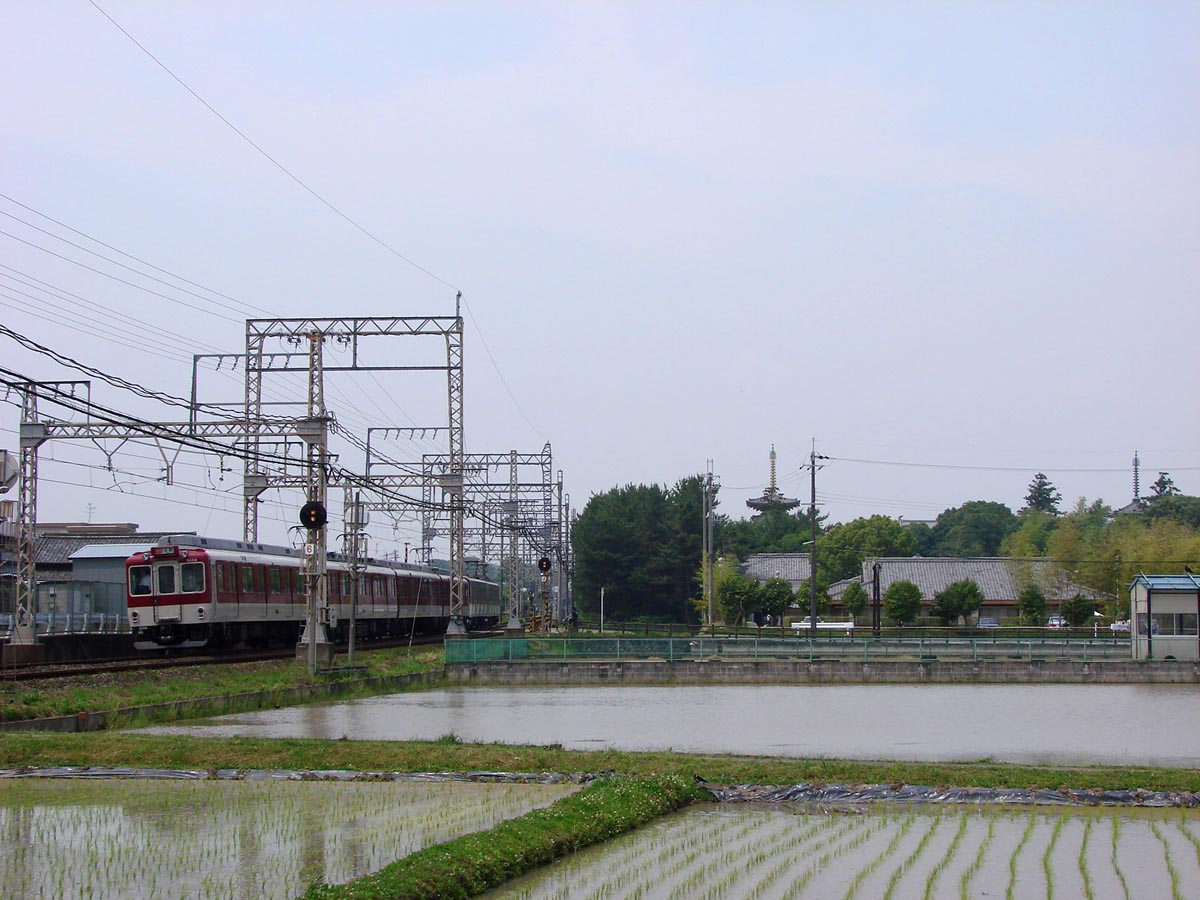
- A Kashihara Line train passing Yakushi-ji temple

Overview
- Native name: 橿原線
- Owner: Kintetsu Railway
- Line number: B
- Locale: Nara Prefecture, Japan: Nara City; Yamatokōriyama City; Tenri City; Kawanishi Town; Miyake Town; Tawaramoto Town; Kashihara City
- Termini: Yamato-Saidaiji; Kashiharajingu-mae
- Stations: 17
- Color on map: (#e7a61a)

Service
- Type: Commuter rail
- System: Kintetsu Railway
- Operator(s): Kintetsu Railway
- Depot(s): Saidaiji

History
- Opened: 1 April 1921; 104 years ago

Technical
- Line length: 23.8 km (14.8 mi)
- Number of tracks: Double-track
- Character: Commuter rail
- Track gauge: 1,435 mm (4 ft 8 1/2 in) standard gauge
- Minimum radius: 240 m (790 ft)
- Electrification: 1,500 V DC (Overhead lines)
- Operating speed: 100 km/h (60 mph)
- Signalling: Automatic closing block
- Train protection system: Kintetsu ATS

The Kashihara Line (橿原線, Kashihara-sen) is a 23.8 km (14.8 mi) north-south bound railway line in Nara Prefecture, Japan, owned and operated by the Kintetsu Railway, a private railway operator. It connects Yamato-Saidaiji Station and Kashiharajingu-mae Station.

== Service outline ==
Most Express and Limited Express trains operate to and from the Kyoto Line, and some Express services operate between Kyoto and Tenri via the line between Saidaiji and Hirahata stations.

== Stations ==
- Local trains stop at every station.

No.	Station	Japanese	Distance (km)	Express	Limited Express	Transfers	Location	
Through section			from Yamato-Saidaiji to Kyoto on the B Kyoto Line (Local trains, express trains, and limited express trains)					
B26	Yamato-Saidaiji	大和西大寺	0.0	O	O	A Kintetsu-Nara Line (A26); B Kyoto Line (through services available)	Nara	Nara
B27	Amagatsuji	尼ヶ辻	1.6	|	|		Nara	Nara
B28	Nishinokyō	西ノ京	2.8	O (Note: Express trains and Kyoto-Kashihara limited express trains stop during off-peak hours only.)	O		Nara	Nara
B29	Kujō	九条	4.0	|	|		Yamatokoriyama	Nara
B30	Kintetsu-Kōriyama	近鉄郡山	5.5	O	|		Yamatokoriyama	Nara
B31	Tsutsui	筒井	8.4	|	|		Yamatokoriyama	Nara
B32	Hirahata	平端	9.9	O	|	H Tenri Line ( H32 ) (through services available)	Yamatokoriyama	Nara
B33	Family-Kōemmae	ファミリー公園前	10.9	|	|		Yamatokoriyama	Nara
B34	Yūzaki	結崎	12.4	|	|		Kawanishi	Nara
B35	Iwami	石見	13.8	|	|		Miyake	Nara
B36	Tawaramoto	田原本	15.9	O	|	I Tawaramoto Line ( I36 : Nishi-Tawaramoto)	Tawaramoto	Nara
B37	Kasanui	笠縫	17.3	|	|		Tawaramoto	Nara
B38	Ninokuchi	新ノ口	19.1	|	|		Kashihara	Nara
B39	Yamato-Yagi	大和八木	20.5	O	O	D Osaka Line (D39)	Kashihara	Nara
B40	Yagi-nishiguchi	八木西口	20.5	O	O	U Man-yō Mahoroba Line (Sakurai Line) (Unebi)	Kashihara	Nara
B41	Unebigoryōmae	畝傍御陵前	22.8	O	|		Kashihara	Nara
B42	Kashiharajingū-mae	橿原神宮前	23.8	O	O	F Minami Osaka Line (F42); F Yoshino Line (F42)	Kashihara	Nara
Through section			from Hirahata to Tenri on the Tenri Line (Local trains and express trains)					

== History ==
The first section of the line, from Saidaiji Station (present-day Yamato-Saidaiji) to Kōriyama Station (present-day Kintetsu Kōriyama), opened on 1 April 1921. The line was extended to Hirahata on 1 April 1922, and the section from Hirahata to Kashiharajingū-mae opened on 21 March 1923.

== See also ==
- List of railway lines in Japan
