= Tajima Station (Nara) =

Railway station in Miyake, Nara Prefecture, Japan

Tajima Station 但馬駅
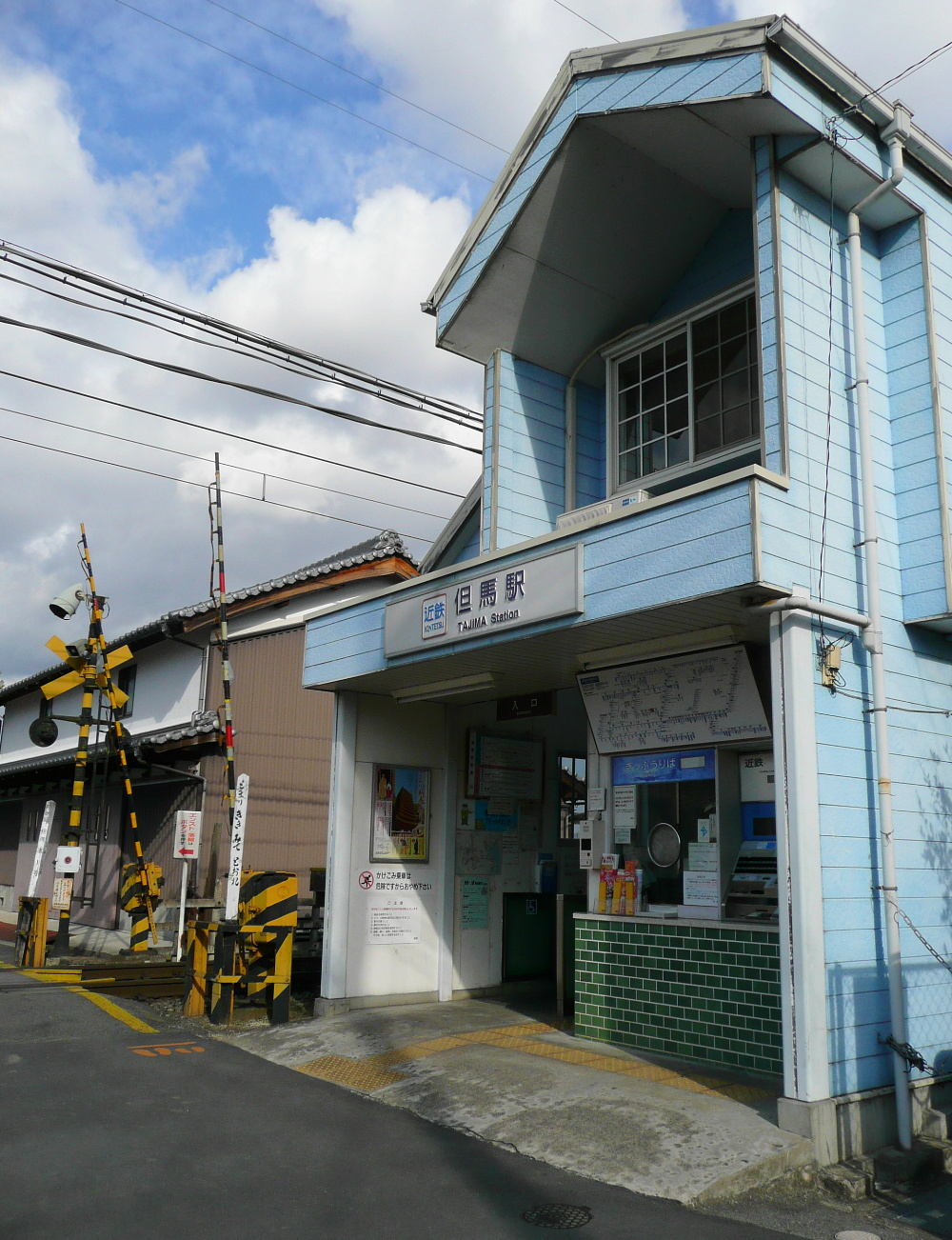
- The exit / entrance of Tajima Station

General information
- Location: 263 Tajima, Miyake-sho, Shiki-gun, Nara-ken 636-0214; Japan
- Coordinates: 34°34′10″N 135°46′04″E
- System: Kintetsu Railway commuter rail station
- Owner: Kintetsu Railway
- Operator: Kintetsu Railway
- Line: I Tawaramoto Line
- Distance: 3.0 km (1.9 miles)
- Platforms: 1 side platform
- Tracks: 1
- Train operators: Kintetsu Railway
- Connections: None

Construction
- Structure type: At grade
- Parking: None
- Cycle facilities: Available
- Accessible: Yes

Other information
- Station code: I38
- Website: www.kintetsu.co.jp/station/station_info/en_station12010.html

History
- Opened: 5 May 1932; 94 years ago
- Electrified: 1948

Passengers
- 2019: 431 daily
Services
Preceding station	Kintetsu Railway	Following station
Hashio towards Shin-Ōji	Tawaramoto Line	Kuroda towards Nishi-Tawaramoto
Location
- Location within Nara Prefecture Location within Japan

Tajima Station (但馬駅, Tajima-eki) is a passenger railway station located in the town of Miyake, Shiki District, Nara Prefecture, Japan. It is operated by the private transportation company, Kintetsu Railway.

== Line ==
Tajima Station is served by the Tawaramoto Line and is 7.1 kilometers from the starting point of the line at Shin-Ōji. The station is serviced by Nara Kotsu Bus Lines' Route 9 bus at Ōwada Sta. Gate from Kataokadai 1-chome once a day, but the services is alighting only. It is also serviced by free shuttle wagon Sunamaru-go's North Route and West Route for Sōgō-fukushi-kaikan 10 shuttles a day.

== Layout ==
The station is an above-ground station with one side platform and one track, and both Shin-Oji and Nishi-Tawaramoto bound trains depart and arrive from the same platform. The effective length of the platform is three cars. The station is unattended.

== Platforms ==
Platform level	Track	I Tawaramoto Line ■ Local for Nishi-Tawaramoto → ← I Tawaramoto Line ■ Local for Shin-Ōji
Platform level	Side platform, doors will open on the right for Nishi-Tawaramoto or on the left for Shin-Ōji
	Street level	Exit / entrance

== History ==
The station opened on 5 May 1932 as a station on the Yamato Railway. It became a station on the Shigiikoma Electric Railway in 1961 due to a company merger, and became a station on Kintetsu Railway by a further merger on 1 October 1964.

== Passenger statistics ==
In fiscal 2019, the station was used by an average of 431 passengers daily (boarding passengers only).

== Surrounding area ==
- Miyake Town Hall
- Miyake Town Miyake Elementary Schoo
- Nara Prefectural Yamato-Koryo Senior High School

== See also ==
- List of railway stations in Japan
