= Otomeyama Kofun =

Kofun period burial mound in Japan

- 乙女山古墳 (Japanese)
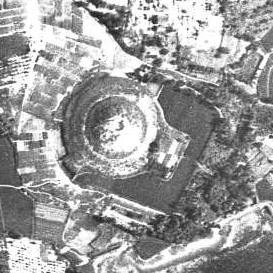
- Otomeyama Kofun

- Otomeyama Kofun Otomeyama Kofun (Japan)
- Interactive map of Otomeyama Kofun
- 34°33′50.2″N 135°44′22.5″E
- Type: Kofun
- Periods: Kofun period
- Location: Kawai - Kōryō, Nara, Japan
- Region: Kansai region

History
- Built: c.5th century

Site notes
- Public access: Yes (no facilities)

Otomeyama Kofun (乙女山古墳) is a burial mound from the Kofun period, located on the border of the Terato neighborhood of the town of Kōryō and the Samita neighborhood of the town of Kawai, Nara Prefecture in the Kansai region of Japan. The tumulus was designated a National Historic Site of Japan in 1956. It is one of the burial mounds that make up the Umami Kofun cluster.

== Overview ==
The Otomeyama Kofun is a hotategaishiki (帆立貝式古墳)-style scallop-shaped burial mound located on the eastern edge of the Umami Hills in western Nara Prefecture, about 800 meters north of the Suyama Kofun. Archaeological excavations were carried out from 1986 to 1987. The posterior circular mound is 94 meters in diameter and 15.5 meters high, and is built in three tiers. To the southeast, it has an extremely low and flat anterior section measuring 50 meters wide and 29 meters long, with a small rectangular projection at the 10 o'clock position of the circular mound. The remains of the moat that surrounded it are also well preserved. The moat is wide at the front and narrower at the rear circular mound. The rear circular mound is built in three tiers, the first and second tiers are low and gentle, and the third tier is steep, giving it the shape of an upside-down bowl. Fukiishi roofing stones are applied to the slopes of each tier. Based on the excavated haniwa clay figurines and the shape of the tomb, it is estimated to date to the first half of the 5th century. Both cylindrical and figurative ( house-shaped, jar-shaped, and lid-shaped) haniwa, as well as earthenware products, Haji ware and Sue ware, were unearthed. The burial facilities in the rear circular mound are unclear, but it is speculated to have been a clay coffin, based on scattered fragments of clay with vermillion coloring.

It is located in the central area of the well-maintained Umami Hillside Park. It is approximately two kilometers southwest of Hashio Station on the Kintetsu Railway Tawaramoto Line.

== See also ==
- List of Historic Sites of Japan (Nara)
