= Ikebe Station =

Railway station in Kawai, Nara Prefecture, Japan

Ikebe Station 池部駅
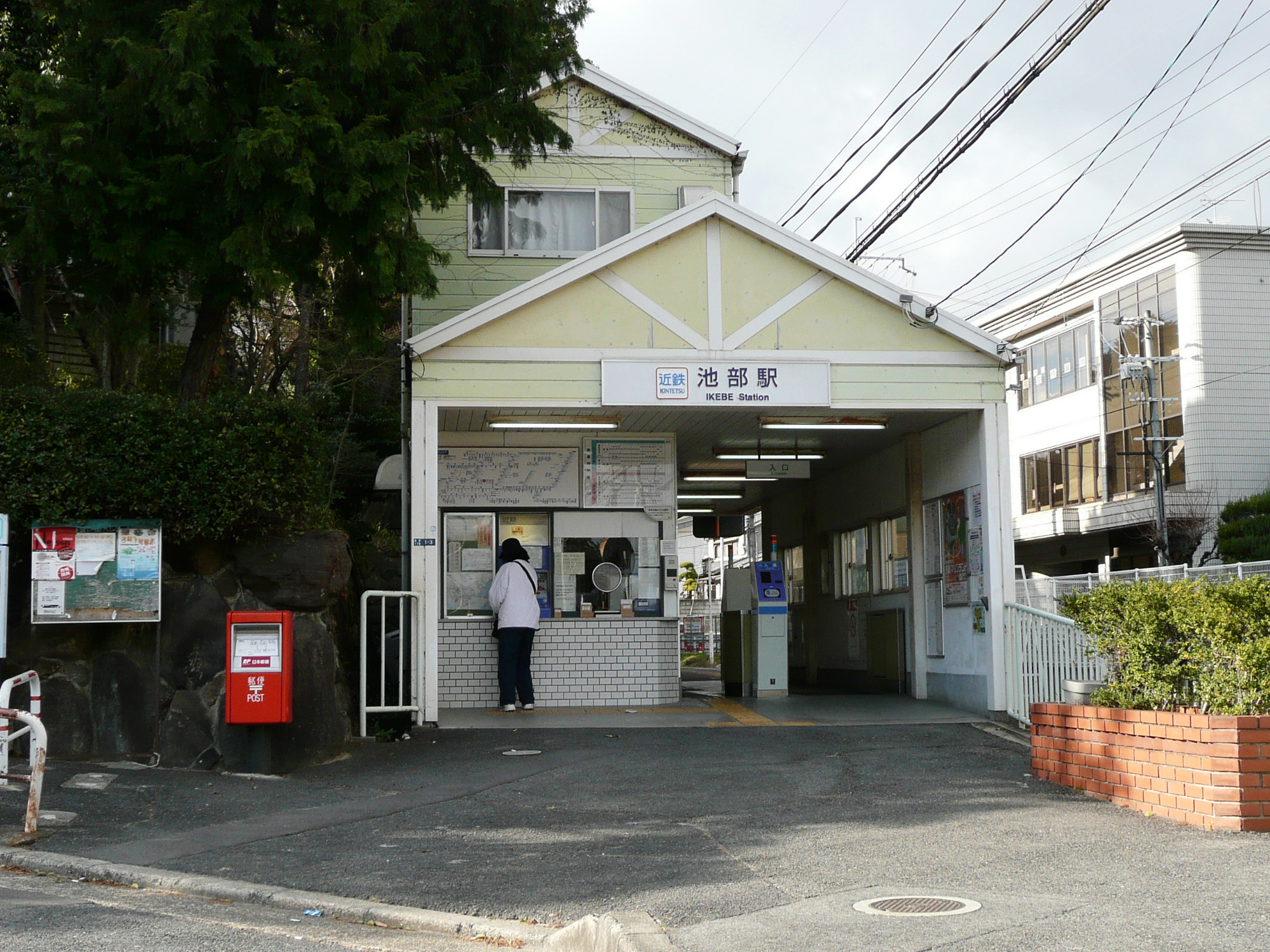
- Ikebe Station Building

General information
- Location: 1-3, Ikebe 1-chōme, Kawai-cho, Kitakatsuragi-gun, Nara-ken 636-0053; Japan
- Coordinates: 34°34′43″N 135°44′15″E
- System: Kintetsu Railway commuter rail station
- Owner: Kintetsu Railway
- Operator: Kintetsu Railway
- Line: I Tawaramoto Line
- Distance: 7.1 km (4.4 miles)
- Platforms: 1 side platform
- Tracks: 1
- Train operators: Kintetsu Railway
- Connections: Kawai Town: Circular Wagon Sunamaru-go (South Route, East Route, and West Route)

Construction
- Structure type: At grade
- Parking: None
- Cycle facilities: available
- Accessible: Yes

Other information
- Station code: I40
- Website: www.kintetsu.co.jp/station/station_info/en_station12008.html

History
- Opened: 26 April 1918

Passengers
- 2019: 697 daily
Services
Preceding station	Kintetsu Railway	Following station
Samitagawa towards Shin-Ōji	Tawaramoto Line	Hashio towards Nishi-Tawaramoto
Location
- Location within Nara Prefecture Location within Japan

Ikebe Station (池部駅, Ikebe-eki) is a passenger railway station located in the town of Kawai, Nara Prefecture, Japan. It is operated by the private transportation company, Kintetsu Railway.

== Line ==
Ikebe Station is served by the Tawaramoto Line and is 4.0 kilometers from the starting point of the line at Shin-Ōji. The station is serviced by Nara Kotsu Bus Lines' Route 9 bus at Ōwada Sta. Gate from Kataokadai 1-chome once a day, but the services is alighting only. It is also serviced by free shuttle wagon Sunamaru-go's North Route and West Route for Sōgō-fukushi-kaikan 10 shuttles a day.

== Layout ==
The station is an above-ground station with a single platform and one track, and both Shin-Oji and Nishi-Tawaramoto bound trains depart and arrive from the same platform. The effective length of the platform is three cars. The station is unattended.

== Platforms ==
Platform level	Track	I Tawaramoto Line ■ Local for Nishi-Tawaramoto → ← I Tawaramoto Line—■ Local for Shin-Ōji
Platform level	Side platform, doors will open on the right for Nishi-Tawaramoto or on the left for Shin-Ōji
	Street level	Exit / entrance

== History ==
The station opened on 26 April 1918 as a station on the Yamato Railway. It became a station on the Shigiikoma Electric Railway in 1961 due to a company merger, and became a station on Kintetsu Railway by a further merger on 1 October 1964.

== Passenger statistics ==
In fiscal 2019, the station was used by an average of 697 passengers daily (boarding passengers only).

== Surrounding area ==
- Kawai Town Hall
- Kawai Town Kawai Daiichi Elementary School
- Kawai Town Kawai Daiichi Junior High School

== See also ==
- List of railway stations in Japan
