= Ōwada Station (Nara) =

Railway station in Kawai, Nara Prefecture, Japan

Ōwada Station 大輪田駅
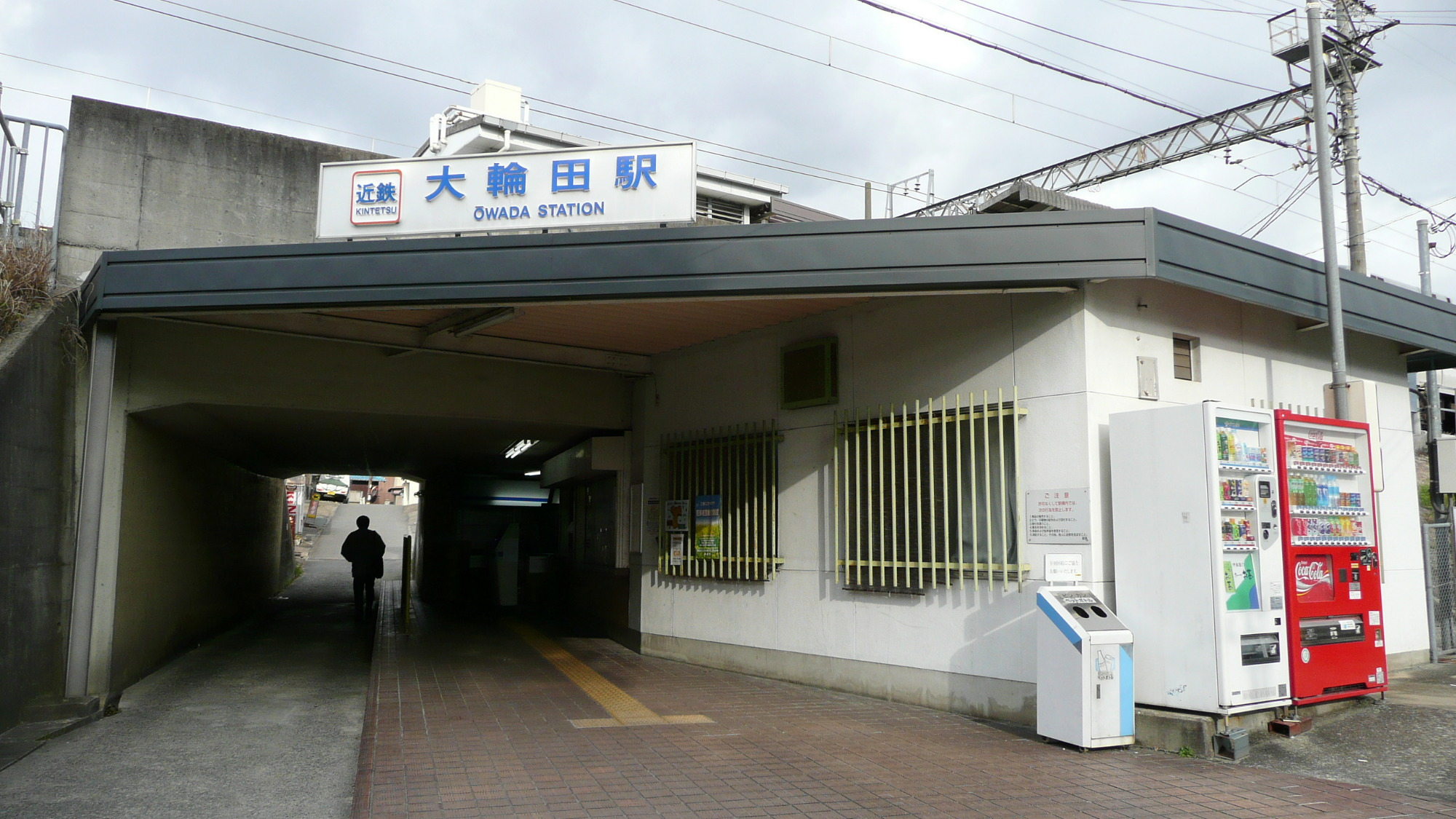
- The exit / entrance gate of Ōwada Station

General information
- Location: 1809-2, Ōaza Ōwada,Kawai-cho, Kitakatsuragi-gun ,Nara-ken 636-0093; Japan
- Coordinates: 34°35′21″N 135°43′13″E
- System: Kintetsu Railway commuter rail station
- Owner: Kintetsu Railway
- Operator: Kintetsu Railway
- Line: I Tawaramoto Line
- Distance: 8.2 km (5.1 miles)
- Platforms: 1 island platform
- Tracks: 2
- Train operators: Kintetsu Railway
- Bus stands: 1
- Connections: Nara Kotsu Bus Lines: 9; Kawai Town: Circular Wagon Sunamaru-go (North Route and West Route)

Construction
- Structure type: Elevated
- Parking: None
- Cycle facilities: Available
- Accessible: None

Other information
- Station code: I42
- Website: www.kintetsu.co.jp/station/station_info/en_station12006.html

History
- Opened: 26 April 1918

Passengers
- 2019: 1375 daily
Services
Preceding station	Kintetsu Railway	Following station
Shin-Ōji Terminus	Tawaramoto Line	Samitagawa towards Nishi-Tawaramoto
Location
- Location within Nara Prefecture Location within Japan

Ōwada Station (大輪田駅, Ōwada-eki) is a passenger railway station located in the town of Kawai, Nara Prefecture, Japan. It is operated by the private transportation company, Kintetsu Railway.

== Line ==
Ōwada Station is served by the Tawaramoto Line and is 1.9 kilometers from the starting point of the line at Shin-Ōji. The station is serviced by Nara Kotsu Bus Lines' Route 9 bus at Ōwada Sta. Gate from Kataokadai 1-chome once a day, but the services is alighting only. It is also serviced by free shuttle wagon Sunamaru-go's North Route and West Route for Sōgō-fukushi-kaikan 10 shuttles a day.

== Layout ==
The station is an elevated station with one island platform and two tracks, allowing trains to pass each other. The effective length of the platform is for three cars. On the partly roofed platform, a passenger waiting area with six plastic benches for 28 persons is located. Amenities include bathrooms and a self-service beverage vending machine. Downstairs below the platform level, there is a ticket booth with two ticket vending machines, and ticket gates with a post-type self-service fare deducting reader. A no-fee bicycle parking, a taxi stand, and a bus stop are located southwest of the station within a minute walk from the ticket gate, but there is no parking spot. The station is unattended.

== Platforms ==
2F Platform level	Track 2	I Tawaramoto Line ■ Local for Nishi-Tawaramoto →
2F Platform level	Island platform, doors will open on the right
2F Platform level	Track 1	← I Tawaramoto Line ■ Local for Shin-Ōji
1F Street level		Exit / entrance, a bicycle facility, and both taxi and bus stands.

== History ==
The station opened on 26 April 1918 as a station on the Yamato Railway. It became a station on the Shigiikoma Electric Railway in 1961 due to a company merger, and became a station on Kintetsu Railway by a further merger on 1 October 1964.

== Passenger statistics ==
In fiscal 2019, the station was used by an average of 1375 passengers daily (boarding passengers only).

== Surrounding area ==
- Hakuho College
- Nishiyamato Gakuen Junior High School and High School
- Nishiyamato New Town

== See also ==
- List of railway stations in Japan
