= Samitagawa Station =

Railway station in Kawai, Nara Prefecture, Japan

Samitagawa Station 佐味田川駅
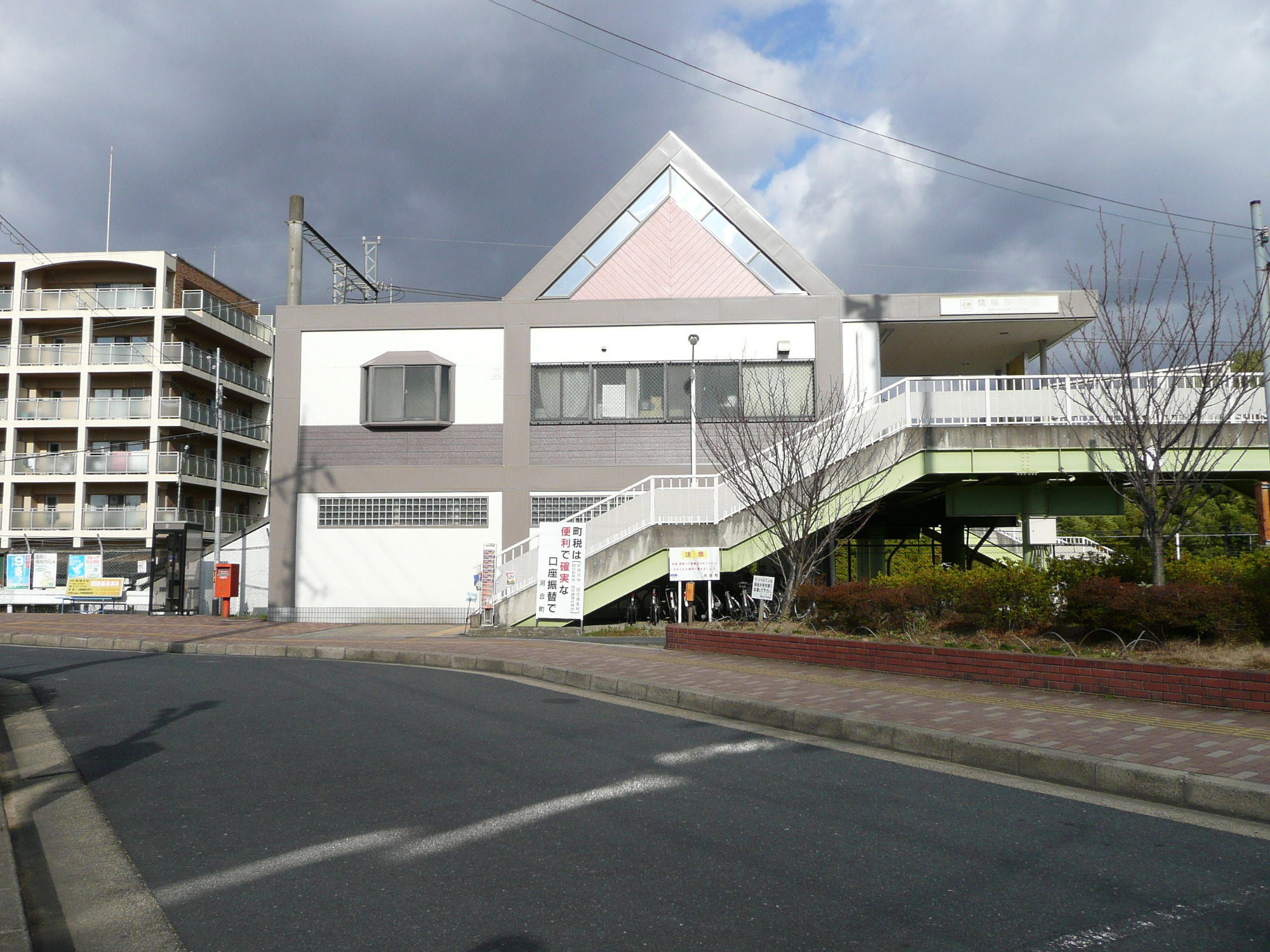
- The South Exit / Entrance of Samitagawa Station

General information
- Location: 281-1, Ōaza Jōnai, Kawai-cho, Kitakatsuragi-gun, Nara-ken 636-0092; Japan
- Coordinates: 34°35′07″N 135°43′52″E
- System: Kintetsu Railway commuter rail station
- Owner: Kintetsu Railway
- Operator: Kintetsu Railway
- Line: I Tawaramoto Line
- Distance: 7.1 km (4.4 miles)
- Platforms: 1 side platform
- Tracks: 1
- Train operators: Kintetsu Railway
- Bus stands: 1
- Connections: Kawai Town: Circular Wagon Sunamaru-go (South Route, North Route, East Route, and West Route)

Construction
- Structure type: At grade
- Parking: None
- Cycle facilities: available
- Accessible: None

Other information
- Station code: I41
- Website: www.kintetsu.co.jp/station/station_info/en_station12007.html

History
- Opened: 1983; 43 years ago

Passengers
- 2019: 915 daily
Services
Preceding station	Kintetsu Railway	Following station
Ōwada towards Shin-Ōji	Tawaramoto Line	Ikebe towards Nishi-Tawaramoto
Location
- Location within Nara Prefecture Location within Japan

Samitagawa Station (佐味田川駅, Samitagawa-eki) is a passenger railway station located in the town of Kawai, Nara Prefecture, Japan. It is operated by the private transportation company, Kintetsu Railway.

== Line ==
Samitagawa Station is served by the Tawaramoto Line and is 3.0 kilometers from the starting point of the line at Shin-Ōji.

== Layout ==
The station is an elevated station with one side platform and one track, and both Shin-Oji and Nishi-Tawaramoto bound trains depart and arrive from the same platform. There is only one ticket gate, and trains enter the station from both the north and south footbridges. The effective length of the platform is three cars. The station is unattended.

== Platforms ==
2F	Mezzanine level	Ticket gates to exits / entrances crossing over a track.
1F Platform level	Street level	Exit / entrance
1F Platform level	Track	I Tawaramoto Line ■ Local for Nishi-Tawaramoto → ← I Tawaramoto Line ■ Local for Shin-Ōji
1F Platform level	Side platform, doors will open on the right for Nishi-Tawaramoto or on the left for Shin-Ōji
1F Platform level	Street level	Exit / entrance

== History ==
The station opened on 30 November 1983.

== Passenger statistics ==
In fiscal 2019, the station was used by an average of 915 passengers daily (boarding passengers only).

== Gallery ==
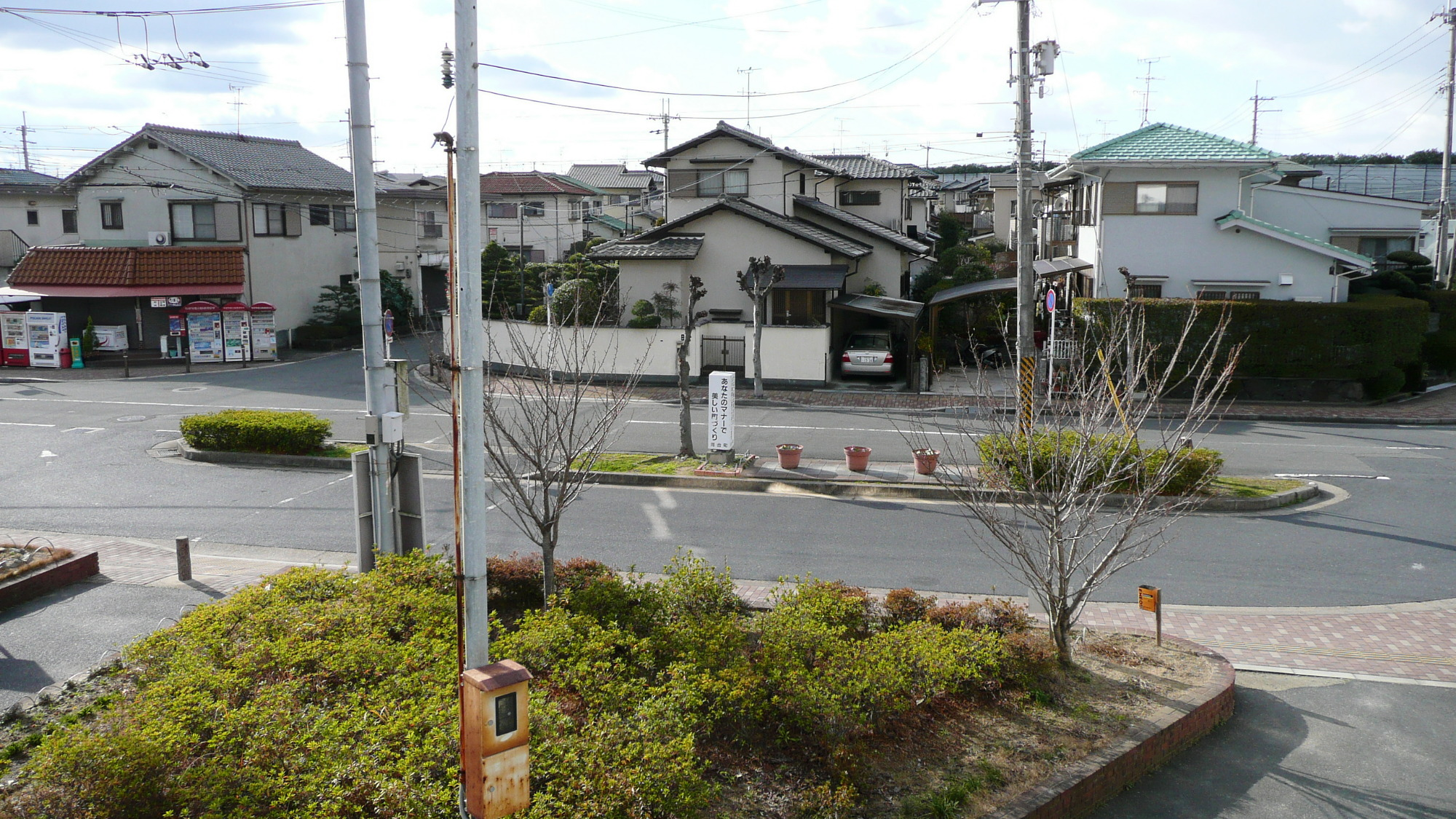
South Plaza

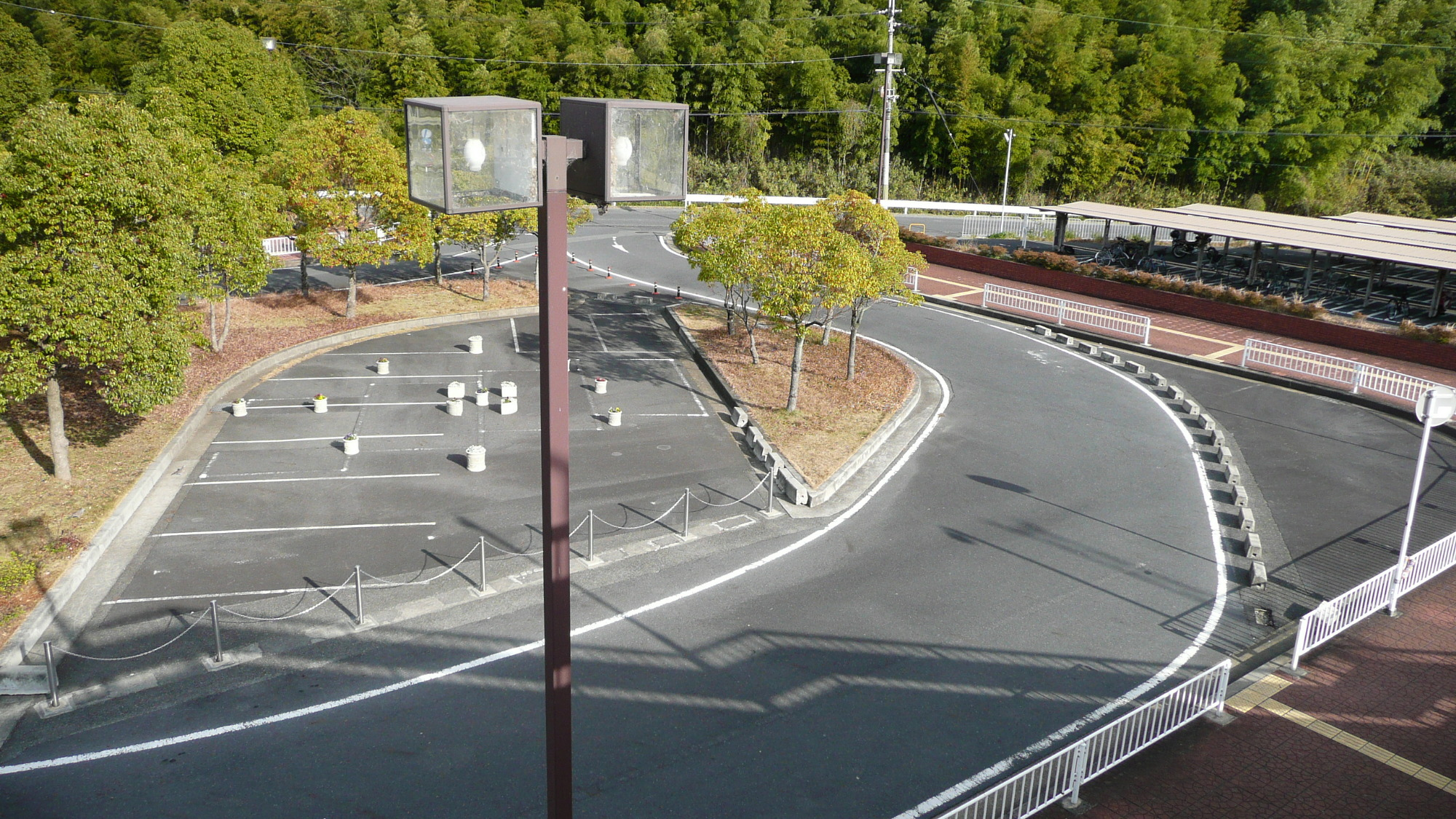
North Plaza

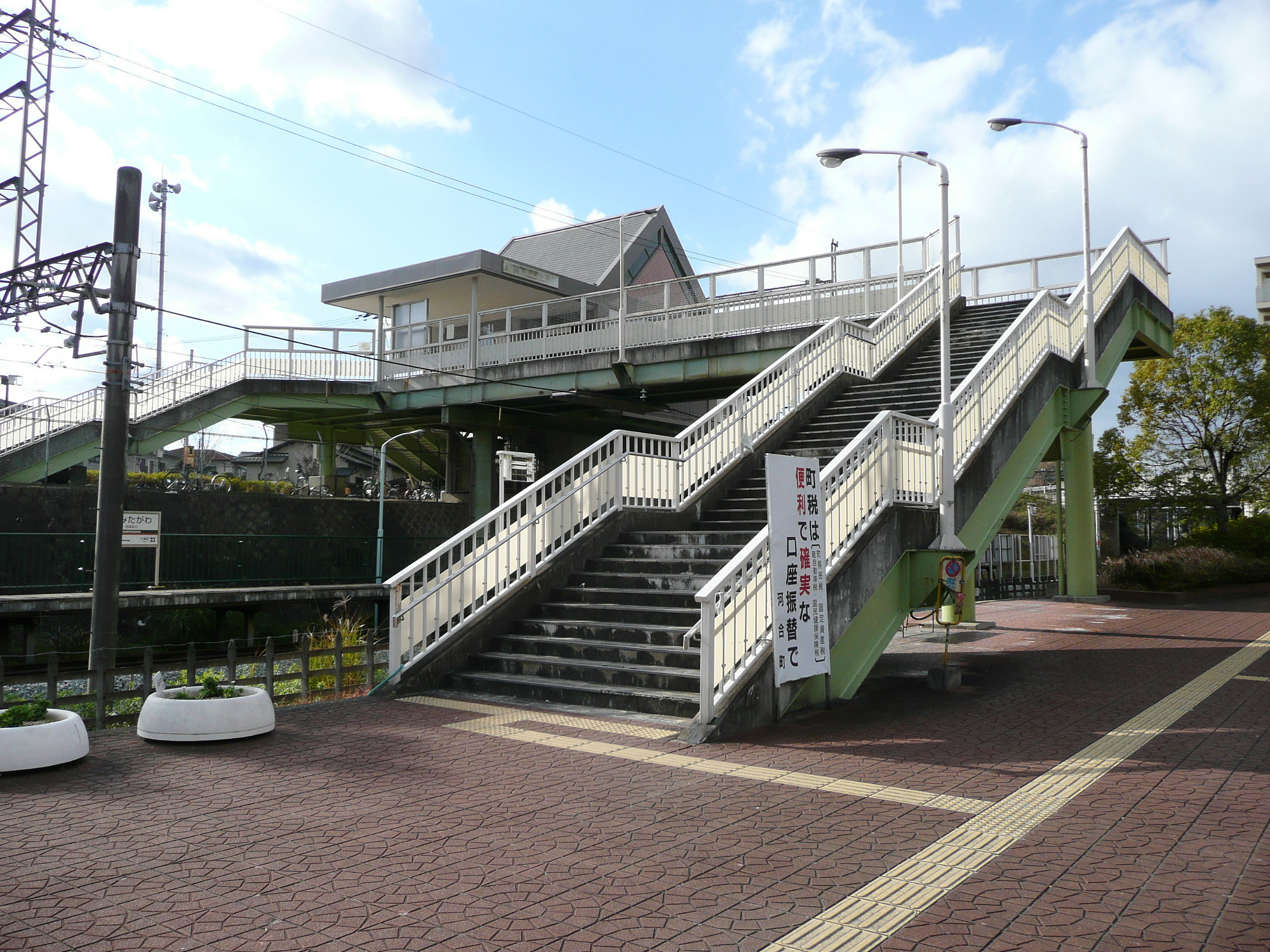
North Exit / Entrance

== Surrounding area ==
- Nishiyamato New Town
- Nishi-Meihan Expressway, Horyuji IC

== See also ==
- List of railway stations in Japan
