= Samida Takarazuka Kofun =

Kofun period keyhole-shaped burial mound in Japan

- 佐味田宝塚古墳 (Japanese)
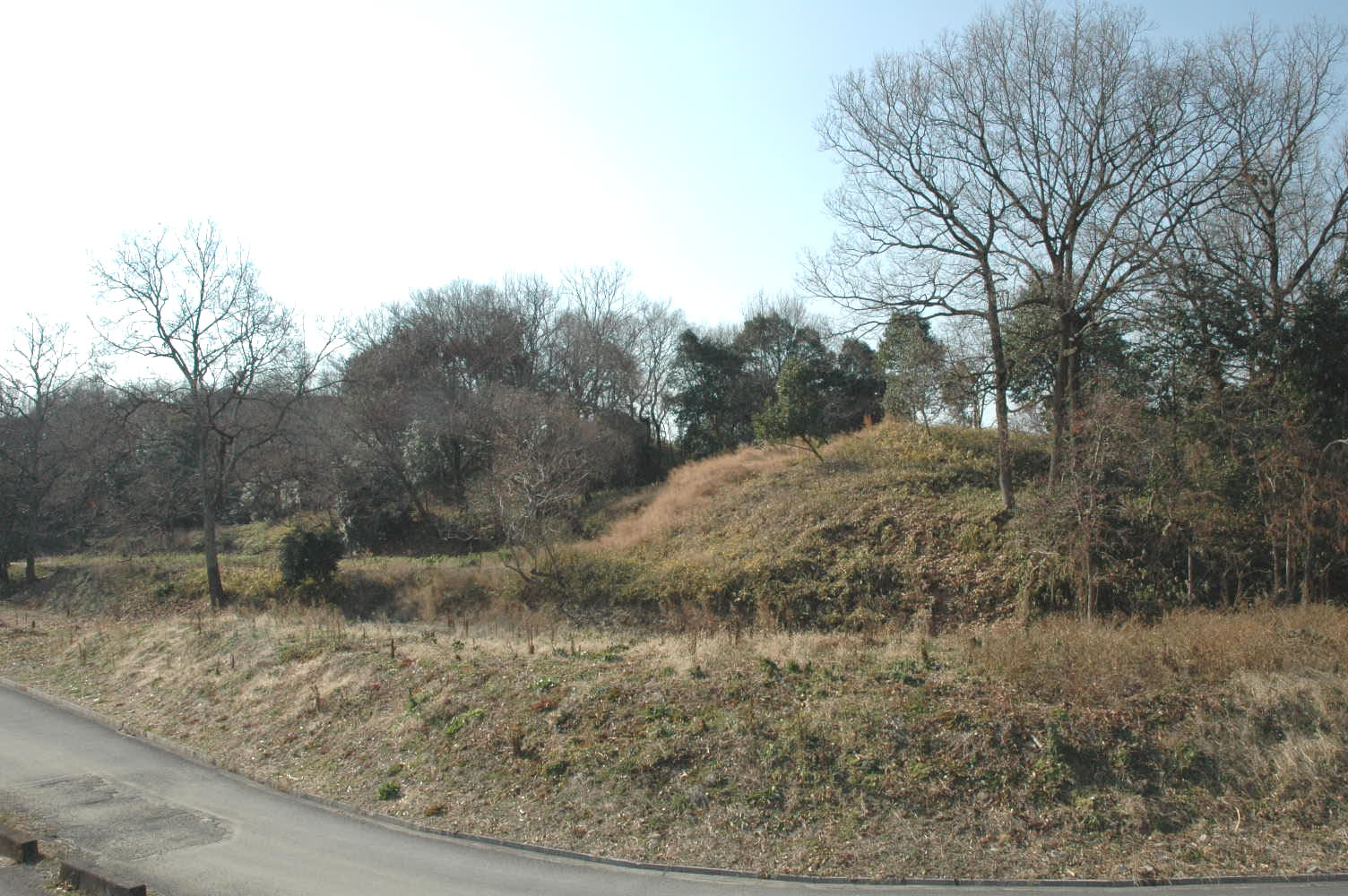
- Samida Takarazuka Kofun

- Samida Takarazuka Kofun Samida Takarazuka Kofun (Japan)
- Interactive map of Samida Takarazuka Kofun
- 34°33′23″N 135°43′37″E
- Type: Kofun
- Periods: Kofun period
- Location: Kawai, Nara, Japan
- Region: Kansai region

History
- Built: c.4th century

Site notes
- Public access: Yes (no facilities)

Samida Takarazuka Kofun (佐味田宝塚古墳) is a Kofun period burial mound, located in the Samida neighborhood of the town of Kawai, Nara in the Kansai region of Japan. The tumulus was designated a National Historic Site of Japan in 1969. The tumulus is also called the Ongonzuka (黄金塚), or "golden mound". It is one of the tumuli that make up the central group of the Umami Tomb Cluster.

== Overview ==
Samida Takarazuka Kofun is located in the western part of the Nara Basin, a little away from the center of the Umami Hills. It is a large zenpō-kōen-fun (前方後円墳), which is shaped like a keyhole, having one square end and one circular end, when viewed from above, with a total length of 111.5 meters. It is orientated to the northeast. The posterior circular portion has a diameter of 60 meters, and the rectangular anterior portion has a width of 45 meters. No moat has been confirmed. Based on a row of cylindrical haniwa excavated from the base of the tumulus, it is believed to have been built around the end of the 4th century to the beginning of the 5th century. These include figurative haniwa depicting shields, lids, short armor, grass skirtings, ridges, houses, and jars. Other excavated artifacts include a wheel stone and fragments of a triangular-rimmed divine beast bronze mirror that was taken from the top of the mound.

The tumulus was "excavated" by local people in 1881 under the pretext of land reclamation, and many grave goods were unearthed. As a result of a proper archaeological excavation carried out in 1985, it was determined that this was the earliest keyhole-shaped tomb built in the Umami area, and that the excavated artifacts were from the early Kofun period. The excavated artifacts total 140 items, including 36 bronze mirrors, jewels, stone bracelets, shovel-shaped stones, stone cups, talc replicas, bronze arrowheads, iron swords, and axes, which are kept in the Tokyo National Museum, Nara National Museum and the Archives and Mausolea Department of the Imperial Household Agency. One of the bronze mirrors has a diameter of 22.9 centimeters, and a design depicting houses and buildings used for rituals and government affairs around the 4th century. These grave goods have been collectively designated as a National Important Cultural Property.

The tumulus is about 4.6 kilometers south of Ōwada Station on the Kintetsu Railway Tawaramoto Line.]

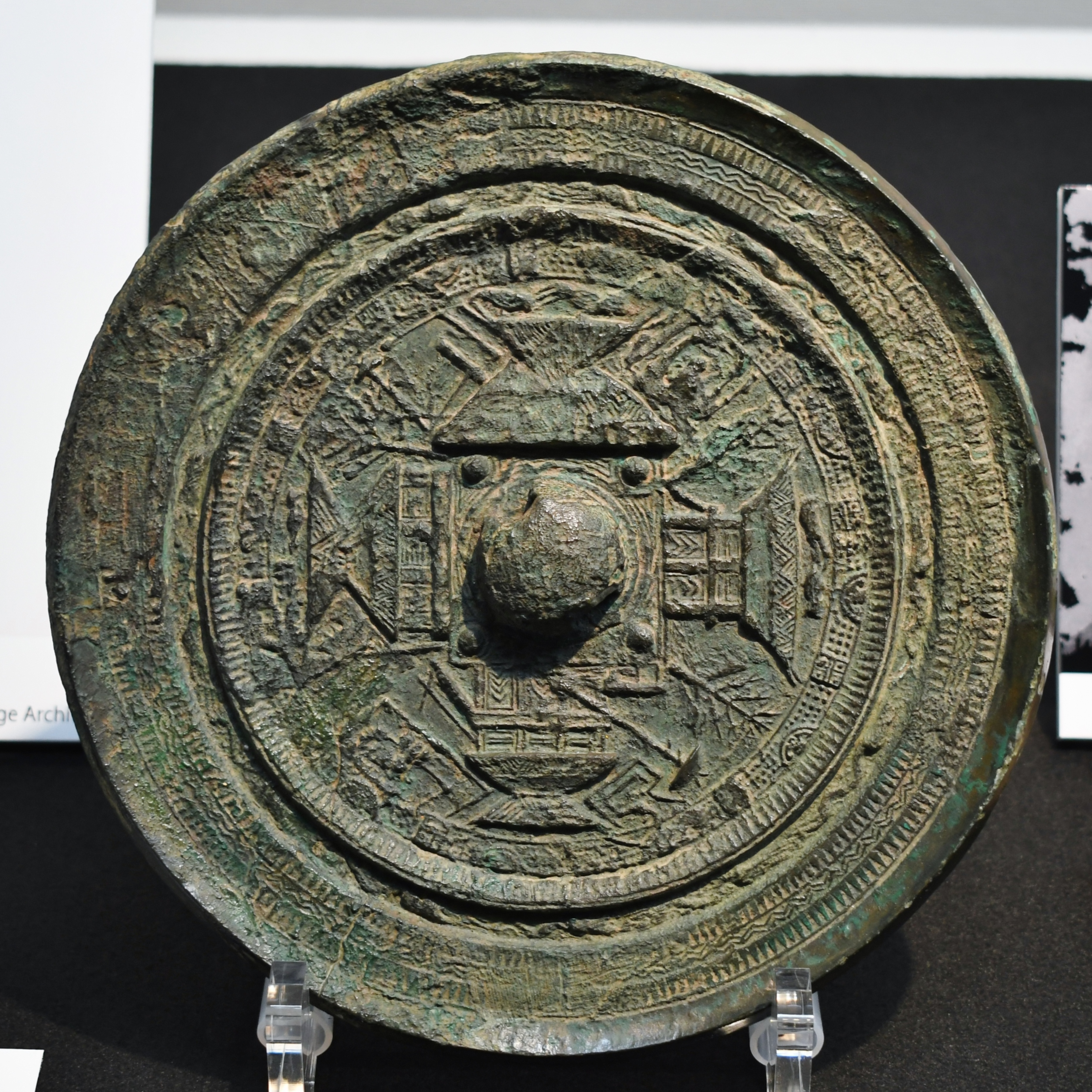
Bronze mirror with designs of buildings

== See also ==
- List of Historic Sites of Japan (Nara)
