= Kuroda Station (Nara) =

Railway station in Tawaramoto, Nara Prefecture, Japan

Kuroda Station 黒田駅
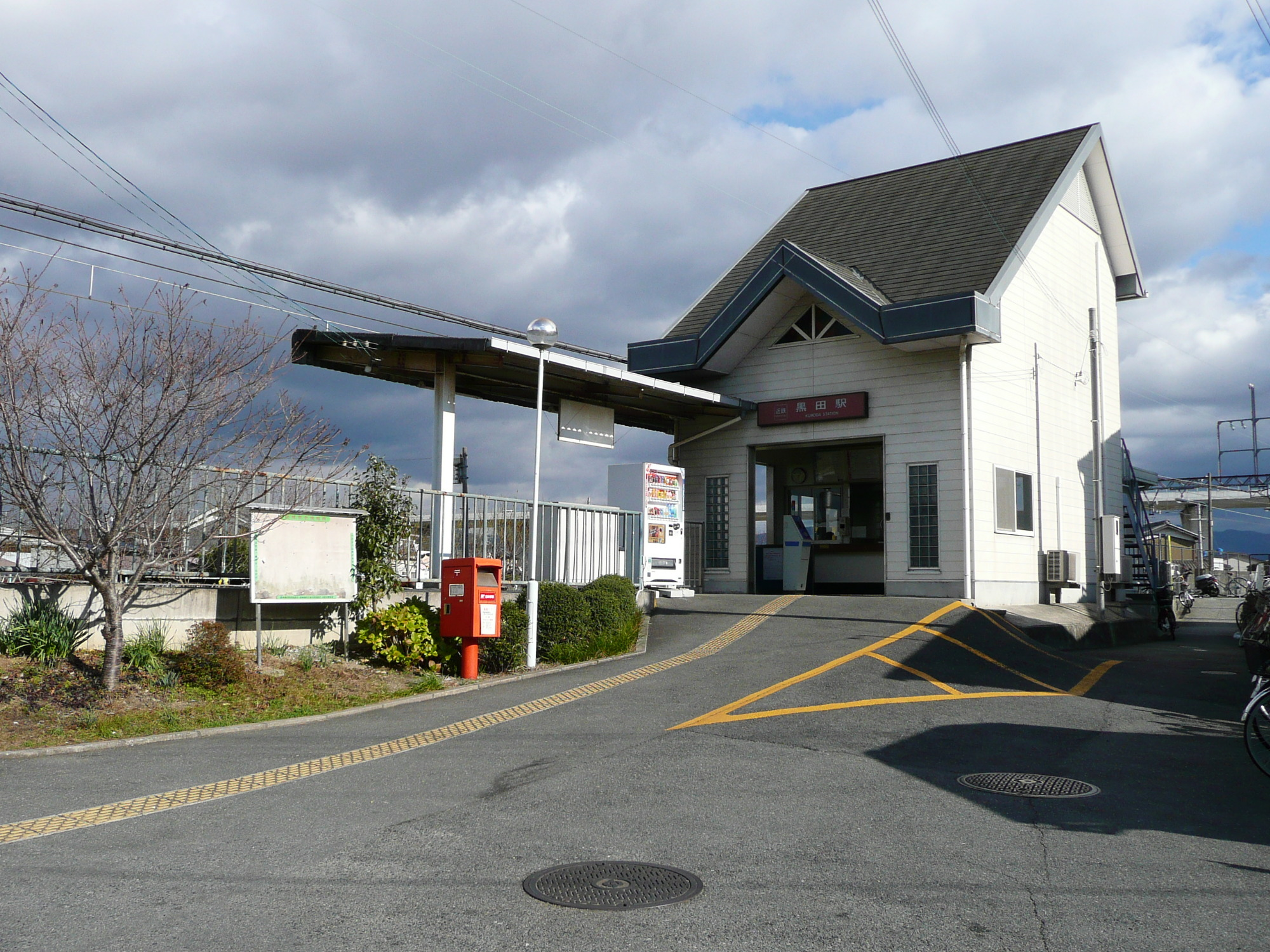
- Kuroda Station

General information
- Location: 277-2345, 277-2345 Kuroda, Tawaramoto-cho, Shiki-gun, Nara-ken 636-0301; Japan
- Coordinates: 34°34′06″N 135°46′39″E
- System: Kintetsu Railway commuter rail station
- Owner: Kintetsu Railway
- Operator: Kintetsu Railway
- Line: I Tawaramoto Line
- Distance: 2.0 km (1.2 miles)
- Platforms: 1 side platform
- Tracks: 1
- Train operators: Kintetsu Railway
- Bus stands: 1
- Connections: None

Construction
- Structure type: At grade
- Parking: None
- Cycle facilities: Available
- Accessible: Yes

Other information
- Status: Unstaffed
- Station code: I37
- Website: Official website

History
- Opened: 26 April 1918; 108 years ago
- Electrified: 1948

Passengers
- 2019: 419 daily
Services
Preceding station	Kintetsu Railway	Following station
Tajima towards Shin-Ōji	Tawaramoto Line	Nishi-Tawaramoto Terminus
Location
- Location within Nara Prefecture Location within Japan

Kuroda Station (黒田駅, Kuroda-eki) is a passenger railway station located in the town of Tawaramoto, Nara Prefecture, Japan. It is operated by the private transportation company, Kintetsu Railway.

== Line ==
Kuroda Station is served by the Tawaramoto Line and is 2.0 kilometers from the starting point of the line at Shin-Ōji.

== Layout ==
The station is an above-ground station with a single side platform and one track, and both Shin-Oji and Nishi-Tawaramoto bound trains depart and arrive from the same platform. The effective length of the platform is three cars. On the north side, part of the concrete retaining wall of the former freight siding platform remains..The station is unattended.

== Platform ==
Platform level	Track	I Tawaramoto Line ■ Local for Nishi-Tawaramoto → ← I Tawaramoto Line ■ Local for Shin-Ōji
Platform level	Side platform, doors will open on the right for Nishi-Tawaramoto or on the left for Shin-Ōji
	Street level	Exit / entrance

== Gallery ==
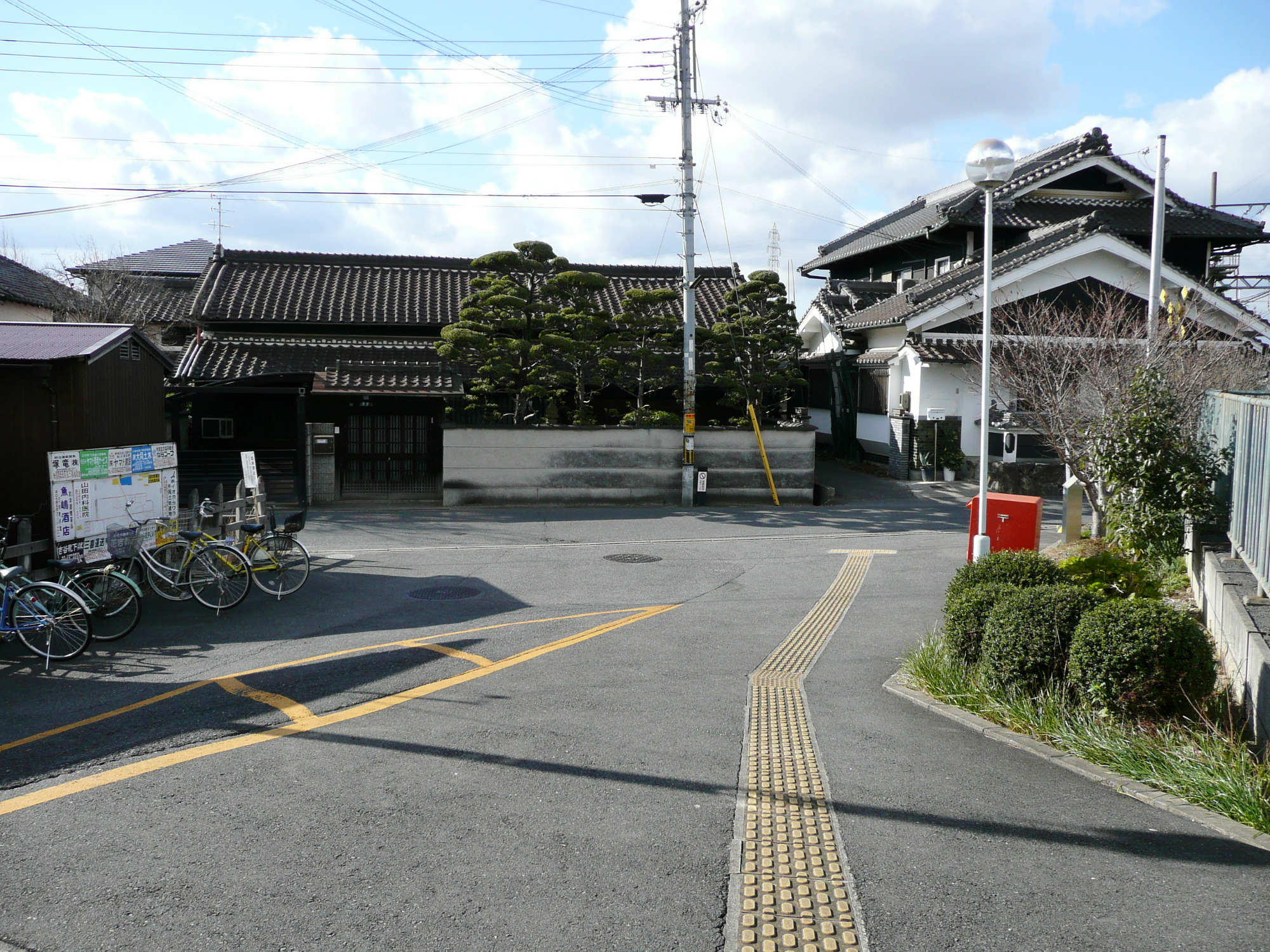
Station plaza

== History ==
Kuroda Station opened on 26 April 1918 on the Yamato Railway when the line was extended from Shin-Oji to Tawaramoto (now Nishi-Tawaramoto Station. On 1 October 1961, the line became part of the Shigiikoma Electric Railway, which then merged with the Kintetsu Railway on 1 October 1964.

== Passenger statistics ==
In fiscal 2019, the station was used by an average of 419 passengers daily (boarding passengers only).

== Surrounding area ==
- Kokuho Central Hospital

== See also ==
- List of railway stations in Japan
