= Jinraku-ji =

Jinraku-ji 秦楽寺
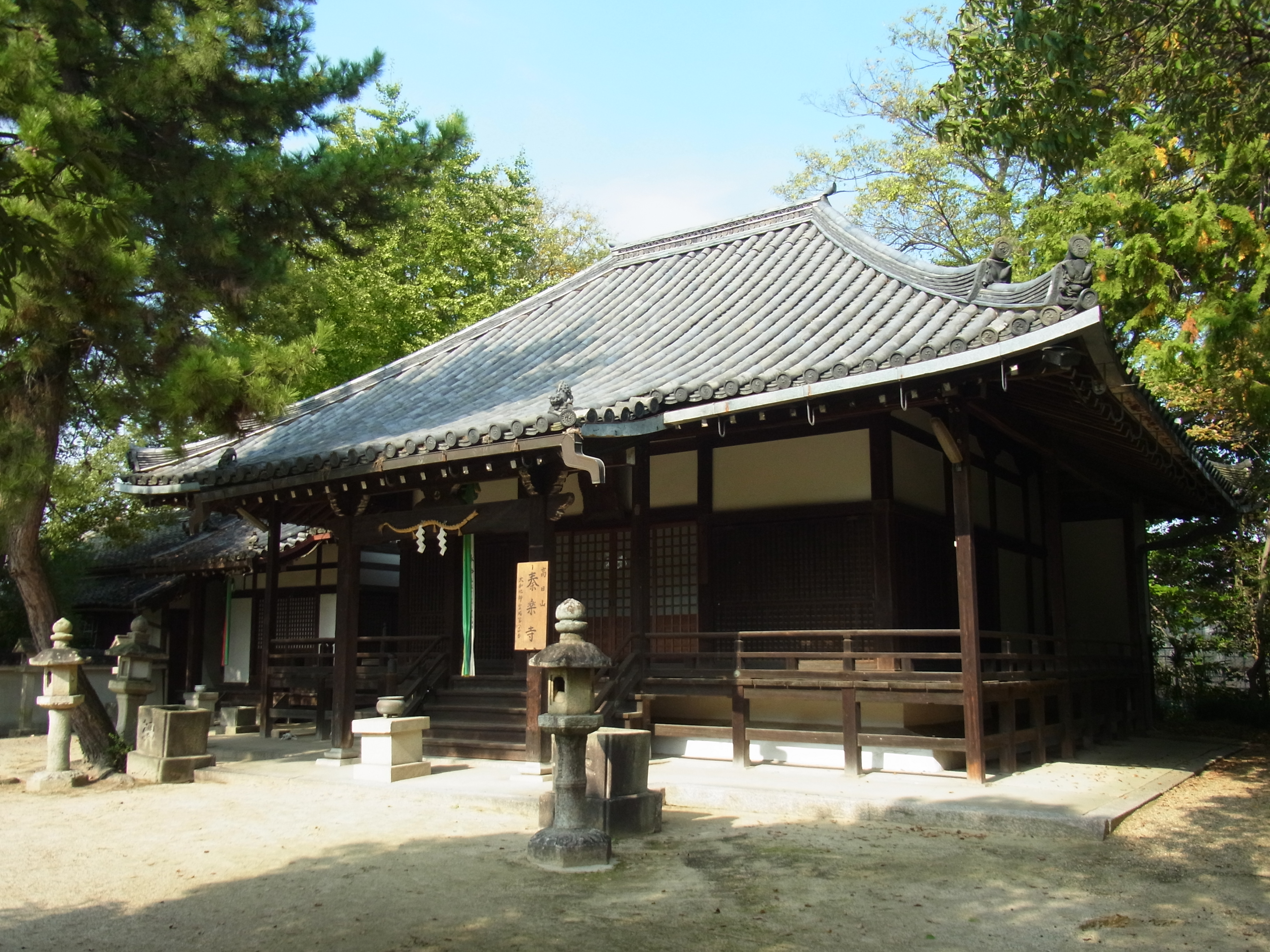

Religion
- Affiliation: Shingon Ritsu
- Deity: Senju Kannon (Thousand-armed Avalokiteśvara)

Location
- Location: 267 Hatanoshō, Tawaramoto-chō, Shiki District, Nara Prefecture
- Country: Japan
- Interactive map of Jinraku-ji 秦楽寺
- Coordinates: 34°32′37.4″N 135°47′31.6″E

Architecture
- Founder: Hata no Kawakatsu
- Completed: 5th century 1759 (restoration)

Jinraku-ji (秦楽寺) is a Buddhist temple in the town of Tawaramoto, Nara Prefecture, Japan. It is located in Tawaramoto near Kasanui Station. It was commissioned by Prince Shotoku in the 5th century and built by Hata no Kawakatsu. The Great Hall contains a Bodhisattva while outside there is also a Shinto shrine with a torii and a pond in the shape of a Chinese character.
