= Hashio Station =

Railway station in Kōryō, Nara Prefecture, Japan

Hashio Station 箸尾駅
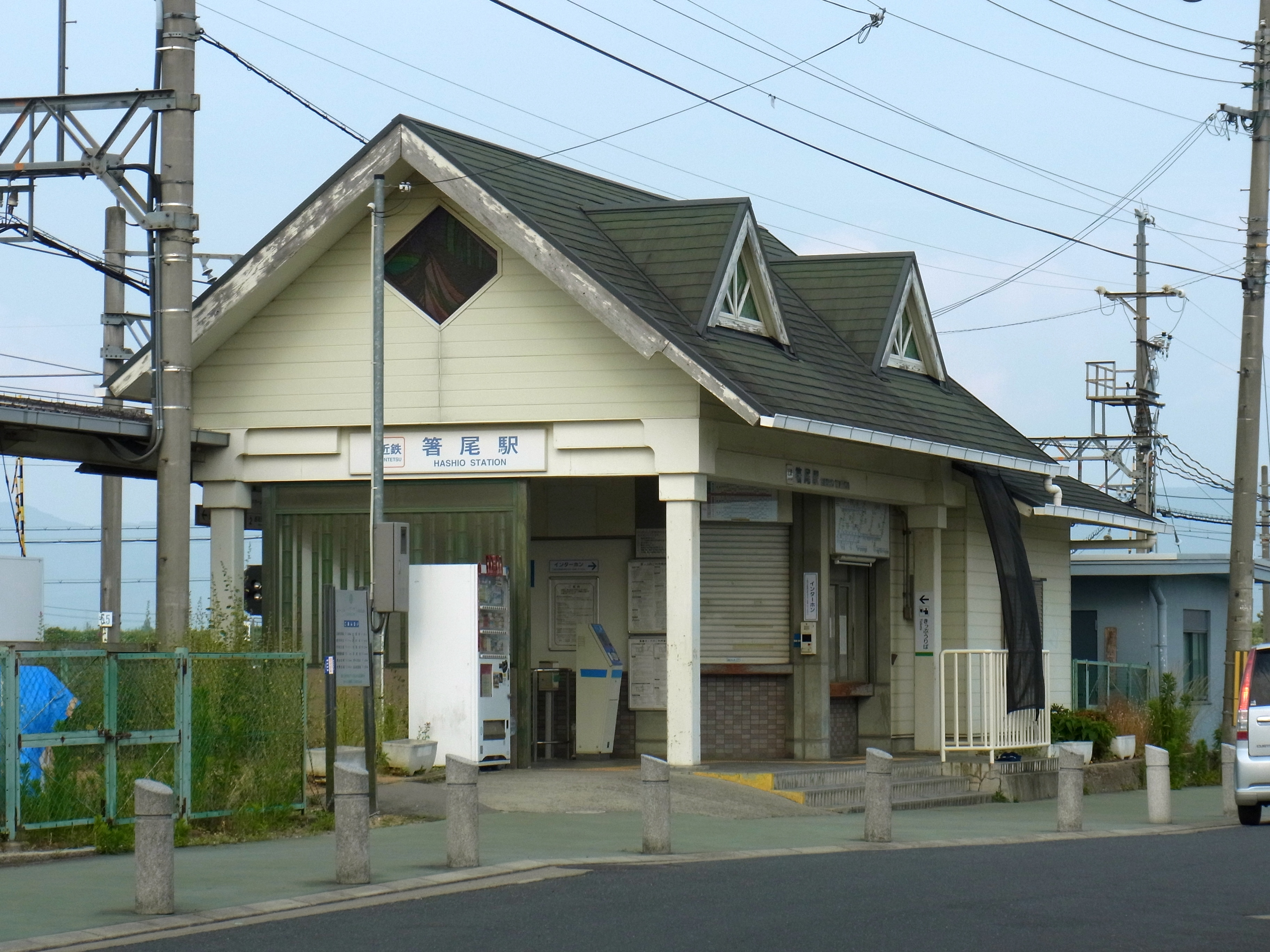
- Hashio station in 2012

General information
- Location: 312-2, Kayano, Kitakatsuragi-gun, Kōryō-chō, Nara-ken 635-0805; Japan
- Coordinates: 34°34′13″N 135°45′05″E
- System: Kintetsu Railway commuter rail station
- Owner: Kintetsu Railway
- Operator: Kintetsu Railway
- Line: I Tawaramoto Line
- Distance: 4.5 km (2.8 miles)
- Platforms: 2 side platforms
- Tracks: 2
- Train operators: Kintetsu Railway
- Bus stands: 1
- Connections: Koryo Town: Community Bus Kōryō-genki-go (Northeastern Branch Route)

Construction
- Structure type: At grade
- Parking: None
- Cycle facilities: Available
- Accessible: Yes

Other information
- Station code: I39
- Website: www.kintetsu.co.jp/station/station_info/en_station12009.html

History
- Opened: 26 April 1918; 108 years ago
- Electrified: 1948

Passengers
- 2019: 1,003 daily
Services
Preceding station	Kintetsu Railway	Following station
Ikebe towards Shin-Ōji	Tawaramoto Line	Tajima towards Nishi-Tawaramoto
Location

Hashio Station (箸尾駅, Hashio-eki) is a passenger railway station located in the town of Kōryō, Nara Prefecture, Japan. It is operated by the private transportation company, Kintetsu Railway.

== Line ==
Hashio Station is served by the Tawaramoto Line ] and is 5.6 kilometers from the starting point of the line at Shin-Ōji.

== Layout ==
The station is an above-ground station with two opposing side platforms and two tracks. The station building (ticket gates) are on the platform 1 side, and platform 2 on the opposite side is connected via a level crossing on the premises near Nishi-Tawaramoto. The effective length of the platform is for three cars. The station is unattended.

== Platforms ==
Platform level	Island platform, doors will open on the left
Platform level	Track 2	I Tawaramoto Line ■ Local for Nishi-Tawaramoto →
Platform level	Track 1	← I Tawaramoto Line ■ Local for Shin-Ōji
Platform level	Island platform, doors will open on the left
	Street level	Exit / entrance

== History ==
Hashio Station was opened 26 April 1918 by the Yamato Railway, which became the Shigiikoma Electric Railway in 1961. The company merged with Kintetsu in 1964.

== Passenger statistics ==
In fiscal 2019, the station was used by an average of 1,003 passengers daily (boarding passengers only).

== Surrounding area ==
- Nara Prefectural Yamato Koryo High School
- Gyōkyō-ji Temple (Hashio Gobō)
- Nara Prefecture 2nd Purification Center

== See also ==
- List of railway stations in Japan
