= Tawaramoto, Nara =

Tawaramoto 田原本町
- Town
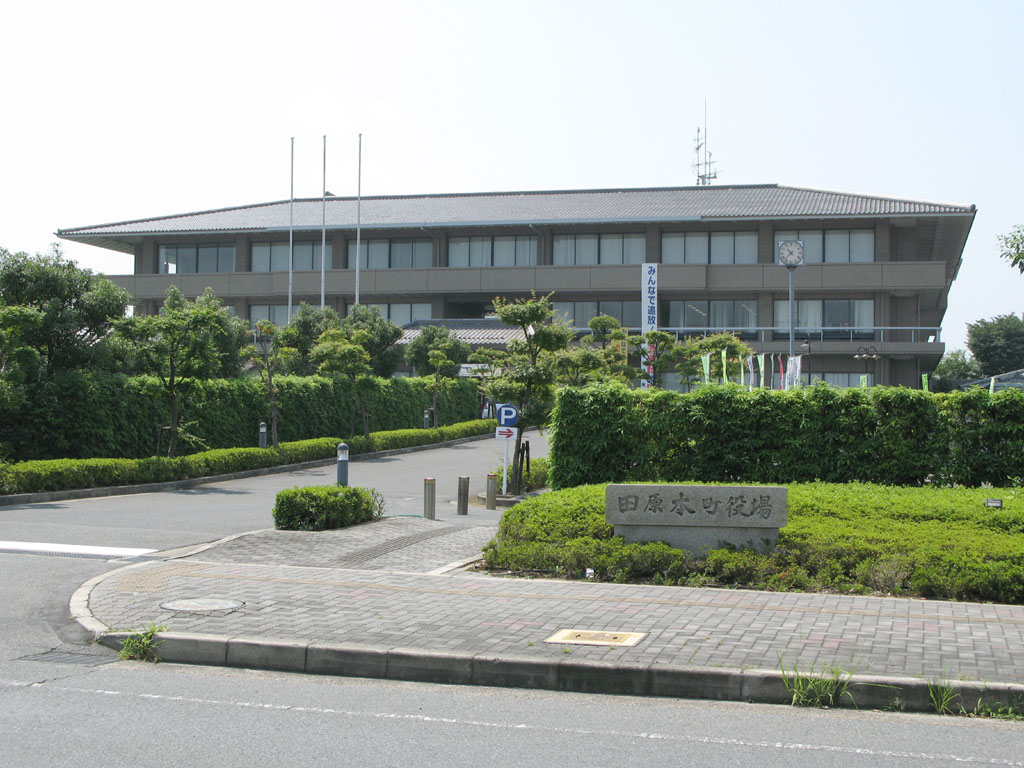
- Tawaramoto Town Office

- Flag Chapter
- Location of Tawaramoto in Nara Prefecture

- Location in Japan
- Coordinates: 34°33′24″N 135°47′42″E
- Country: Japan
- Region: Kansai
- Prefecture: Nara
- District: Shiki

Area
  - Total: 21.09 km^{2} (8.14 sq mi)

Population (September 30, 2024)
  - Total: 31,470
  - Density: 1,492/km^{2} (3,865/sq mi)
- Time zone: UTC+09:00 (JST)
- City hall address: 890-1 Tawarmoto-chō, Nara-ken 636-0392
- Website: Official website
- Symbols
- Flower: Narcissus
- Tree: Quercus gilva

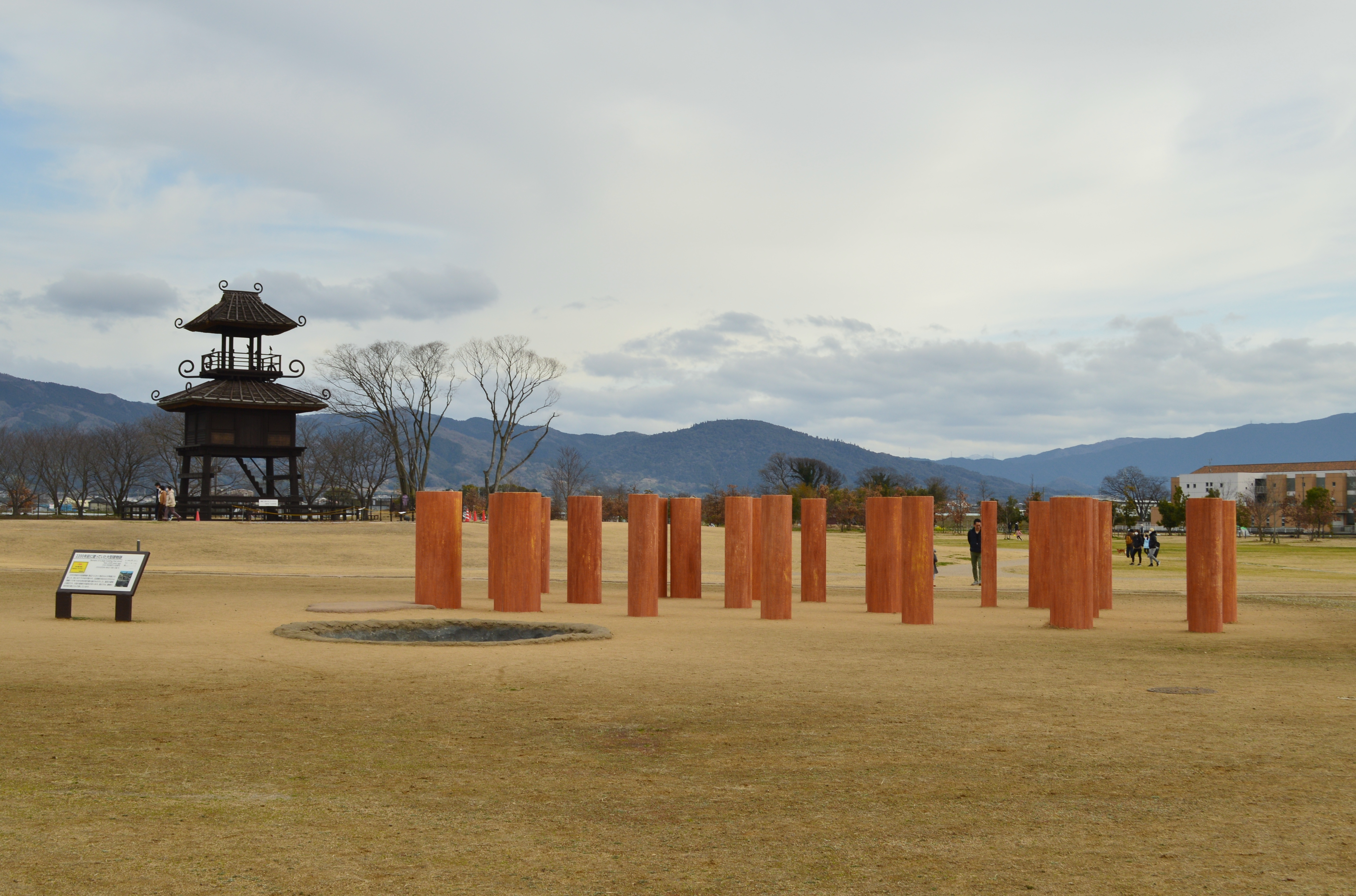
Karako-Kagi Site

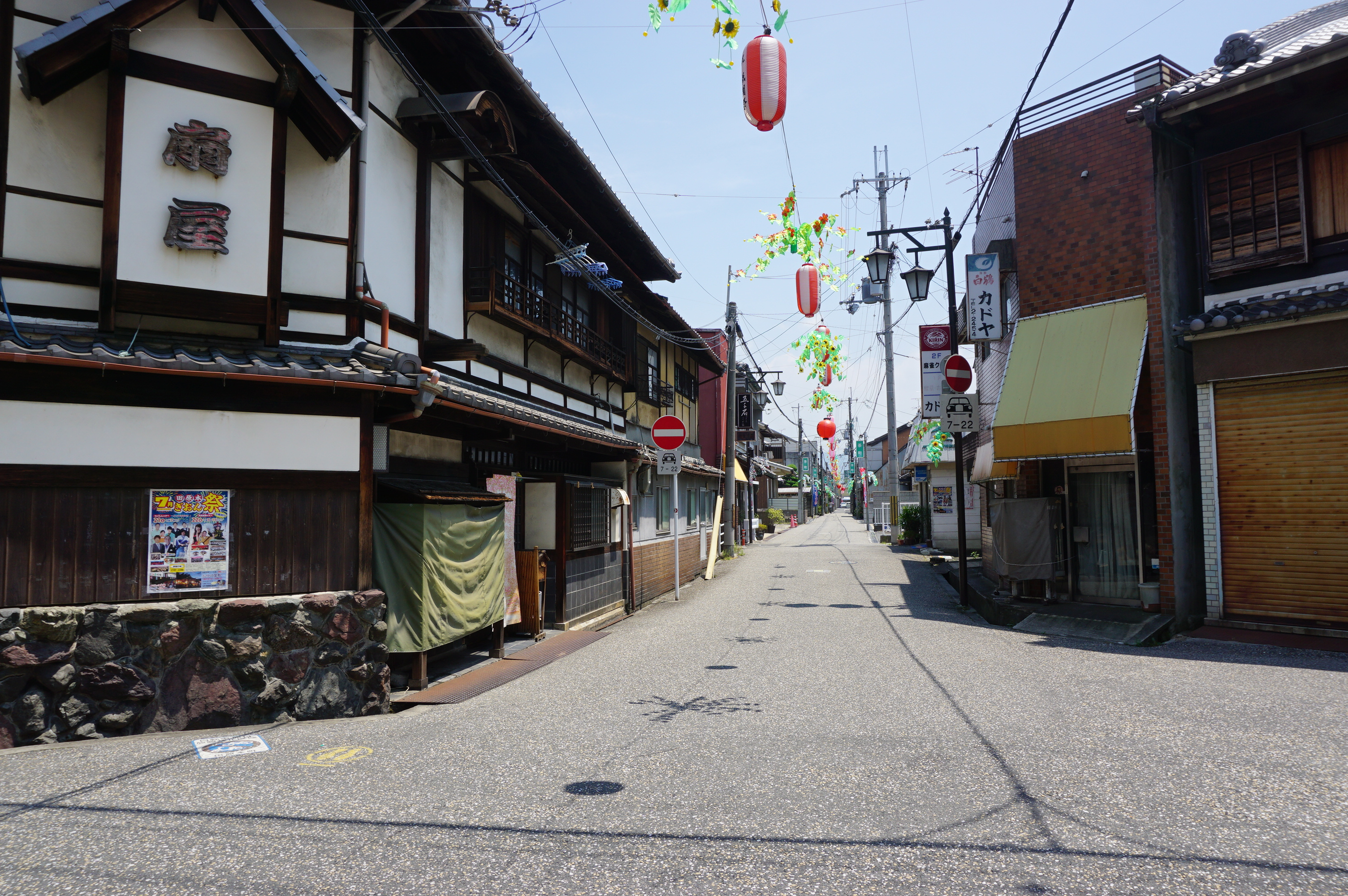
downtown Tawaramoto

Tawaramoto (田原本町, Tawaramoto-chō) is a town located in Shiki District, Nara Prefecture, Japan. As of 30 September 2024, the town had an estimated population of 31,470 in 13653 households, and a population density of 1500 persons per km^{2}. The total area of the town is 21.09 km^{2} (8.14 sq mi).

== Geography ==
Located in the center of the Nara Basin, the entire area of Tawaramoto is flat. The Yamato River flows through the eastern part of the town, the Tera River flows in the center, and the Asuka River and Soga River flow northward in the western part.

=== Surrounding municipalities ===
Nara Prefecture

- Kashihara
- Kōryō
- Miyake
- Sakurai
- Tenri

=== Climate ===
Tawaramoto has a humid subtropical climate (Köppen Cfa) characterized by warm summers and cool winters with light to no snowfall. The average annual temperature in Tawaramoto is 14.1 °C. The average annual rainfall is 1636 mm with September as the wettest month. The temperatures are highest on average in August, at around 26.1 °C, and lowest in January, at around 2.6 °C.

=== Demographics ===
Per Japanese census data, the population of Tawaramoto is as shown below

Historical population
Year	Pop.	±%
1960	19,769	—
1970	20,988	+6.2%
1980	28,172	+34.2%
1990	31,533	+11.9%
2000	32,934	+4.4%
2010	32,121	−2.5%
2020	31,177	−2.9%

== History ==
The area of Tawaramoto was part of ancient Yamato Province and contains extensive Yayoi period ruins. During the Edo period, the area was ruled by the hatamoto Hirano clan, which was briefly (1868–1871) raised to the status of "Tawaramoto Domain" in the early years of the Meiji period. The town of Tawaramoto was established on April 1, 1889, with the creation of the modern municipalities system. On September 30, 1956, Tawaramoto annexed the neighboring villages of Tama, Kawahigashi, Hirano and Miyako.

== Government ==
Tawaramoto has a mayor-council form of government with a directly elected mayor and a unicameral town council of 14 members. Tawaramoto contributes two members to the Nara Prefectural Assembly. In terms of national politics, the town is part of the Nara 2nd district of the lower house of the Diet of Japan.

== Economy ==
The local economy is based on agriculture and light manufacturing.

== Education ==
Tawaramoto has five public elementary schools and two public junior high schools operated by the town government and two public high schools operated by the Nara Prefectural Board of Education.

== Transportation ==
=== Railways ===
Kintetsu Railway - Kashihara Line

Tawaramoto - Kasanui

Kintetsu Railway - Tawaramoto Line

Kuroda - Nishi-Tawaramoto

=== Highways ===
- Keinawa Expressway
- National Route 24

== Local attractions ==
- Karako-Kagi Site, National Historic Site
- Jinraku-ji

== Notable people from Tawaramoto ==
- Sue Sumii, social reformer, writer, and novelist
