= Miyake, Nara =

Miyake 三宅町
- Town
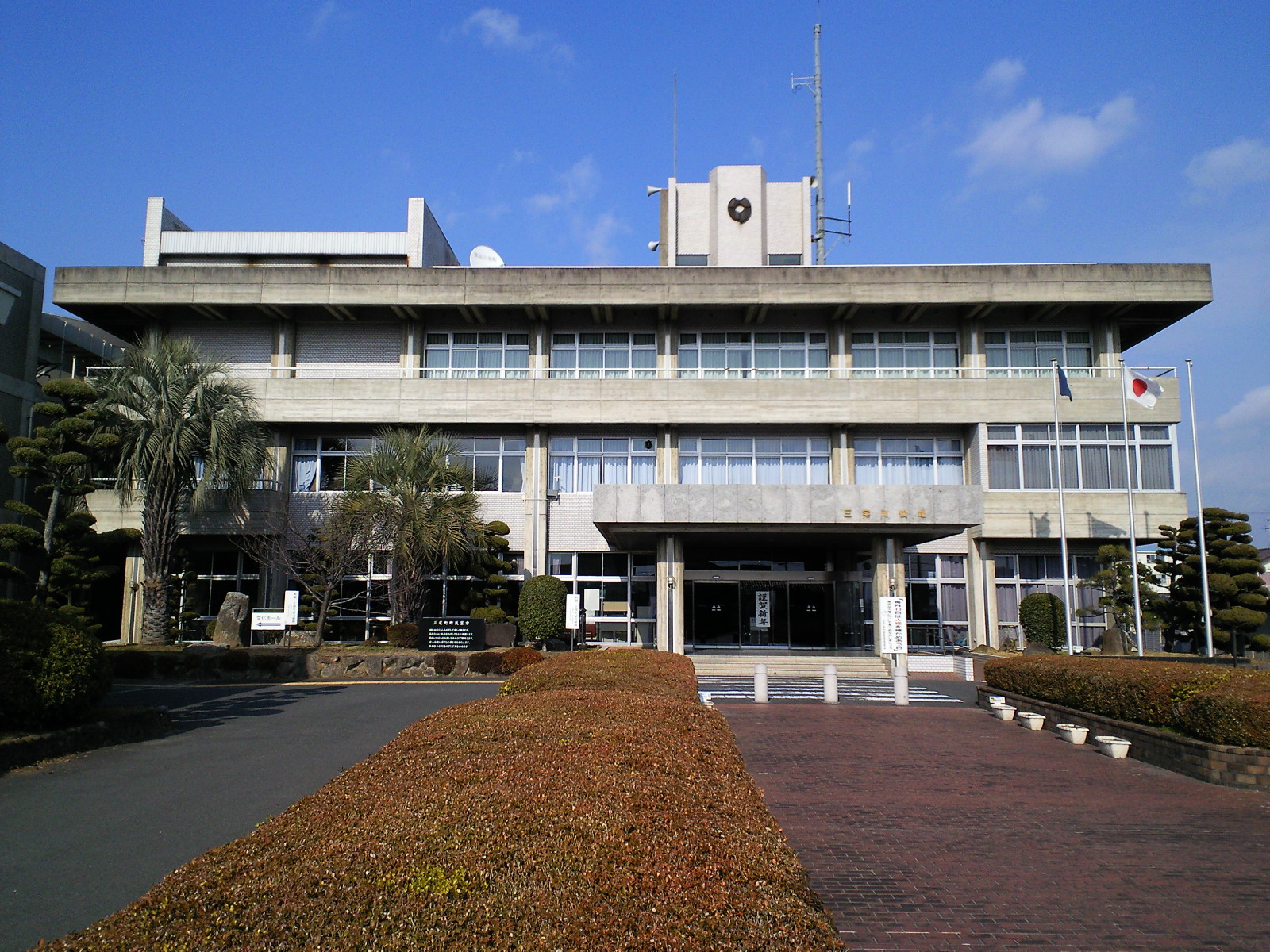
- Miyake Town Office

- Flag Chapter
- Interactive map of Miyake
- Location in Japan
- Coordinates: 34°34′25″N 135°46′24″E
- Country: Japan
- Region: Kansai
- Prefecture: Nara
- District: Shiki

Area
  - Total: 4.06 km^{2} (1.57 sq mi)

Population (November 1, 2024)
  - Total: 6,430
  - Density: 1,580/km^{2} (4,100/sq mi)
- Time zone: UTC+09:00 (JST)
- City hall address: 689 Tomondo Ōaza, Miyake-chō, Nara-ken 636-0213
- Website: Official website
- Symbols
- Flower: Nara yaezakura
- Tree: Sweet Osmanthus

Miyake (三宅町, Miyake-chō) is a town located in Shiki District, Nara Prefecture, Japan.As of 1 November 2024, the town had an estimated population of 6430 in 3060 households, and a population density of 1600 persons per km^{2}. The total area of the city is 25.79 km^{2} (9.96 sq mi). It is smallest municipality in area in Nara Prefecture.

== Geography ==
Miyake is located in northeast Nara Prefecture, in the flatlands of the Nara Basin.

=== Surrounding municipalities ===
Nara Prefecture

- Tenri
- Kawanishi
- Tawaramoto
- Kōryō
- Kawai

=== Climate ===
Miyake has a humid subtropical climate (Köppen Cfa) characterized by warm summers and cool winters with light to no snowfall. The average annual temperature in Miyake is 14.1 °C. The average annual rainfall is 1636 mm with September as the wettest month. The temperatures are highest on average in August, at around 26.1 °C, and lowest in January, at around 2.6 °C.

=== Demographics ===
Per Japanese census data, the population of Miyake is as shown below

Historical population
Year	Pop.	±%
1940	3,576	—
1950	4,337	+21.3%
1960	4,946	+14.0%
1970	6,430	+30.0%
1980	8,560	+33.1%
1990	8,620	+0.7%
2000	8,042	−6.7%
2010	7,440	−7.5%
2020	6,439	−13.5%

== History ==
The area of Miyake was part of ancient Yamato Province and contains many kofun burial mounds.

The village of Miyake was established on April 1, 1889, with the creation of the modern municipalities system. It was elevated to town status on April 1, 1974.

== Government ==
Miyake has a mayor-council form of government with a directly elected mayor and a unicameral town council of ten members. Miyake, collectively with the other municipalities of Ikoma District, contributes four members to the Nara Prefectural Assembly. In terms of national politics, the town is part of the Nara 2nd district of the lower house of the Diet of Japan.

== Economy ==
The town has long been a thriving producer of sports goods (especially baseball gloves and cleats), and there are still nearly 50 companies in the area. At its peak (around 1970), Miyake-cho accounted for 80% of the country's glove production. There are also many textile factories, with a particularly large production of socks.

== Education ==
Miyake has one public elementary schools and one public junior high school operated by the town government. The town does not have a high school.

== Transportation ==
=== Railways ===
Kintetsu Railway - Kashihara Line

Iwami

Kintetsu Railway - Tawaramoto Line

Tajima

=== Highways ===
- Keinawa Expressway
