= Ōji, Nara =

Ōji 王寺町
- Town
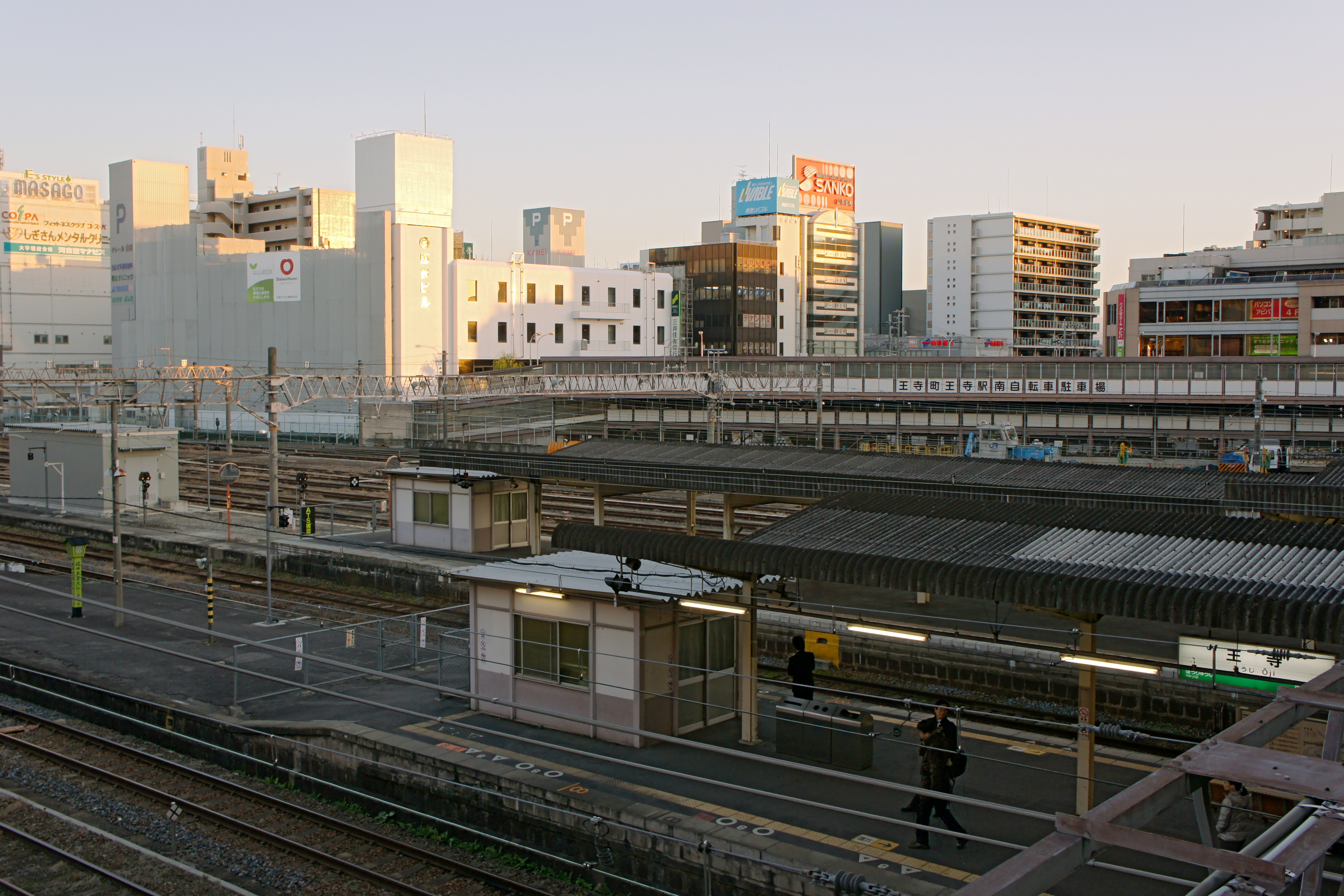
- Oji Station

- Flag Chapter

- Location in Japan
- Coordinates: 34°35′21″N 135°43′24″E
- Country: Japan
- Region: Kansai
- Prefecture: Nara
- District: Kitakatsuragi

Area
  - Total: 7.01 km^{2} (2.71 sq mi)

Population (October 31, 2023)
  - Total: 23,706
  - Density: 3,380/km^{2} (8,760/sq mi)
- Time zone: UTC+09:00 (JST)
- City hall address: 2-1-23 Oji 2-chome, Oji-cho, Kitakatsuragi-gun, Nara-ken 636-8511
- Website: Official website
- Symbols
- Flower: Rhododendron indicum
- Tree: Prunus mume

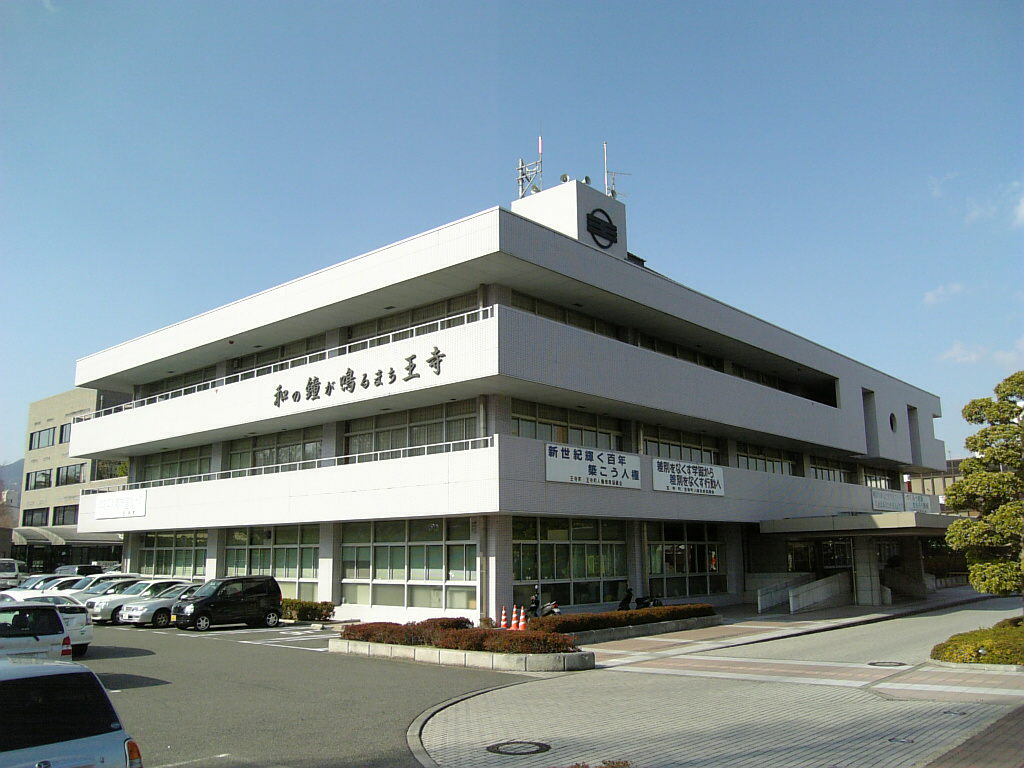
Oji Town Hall

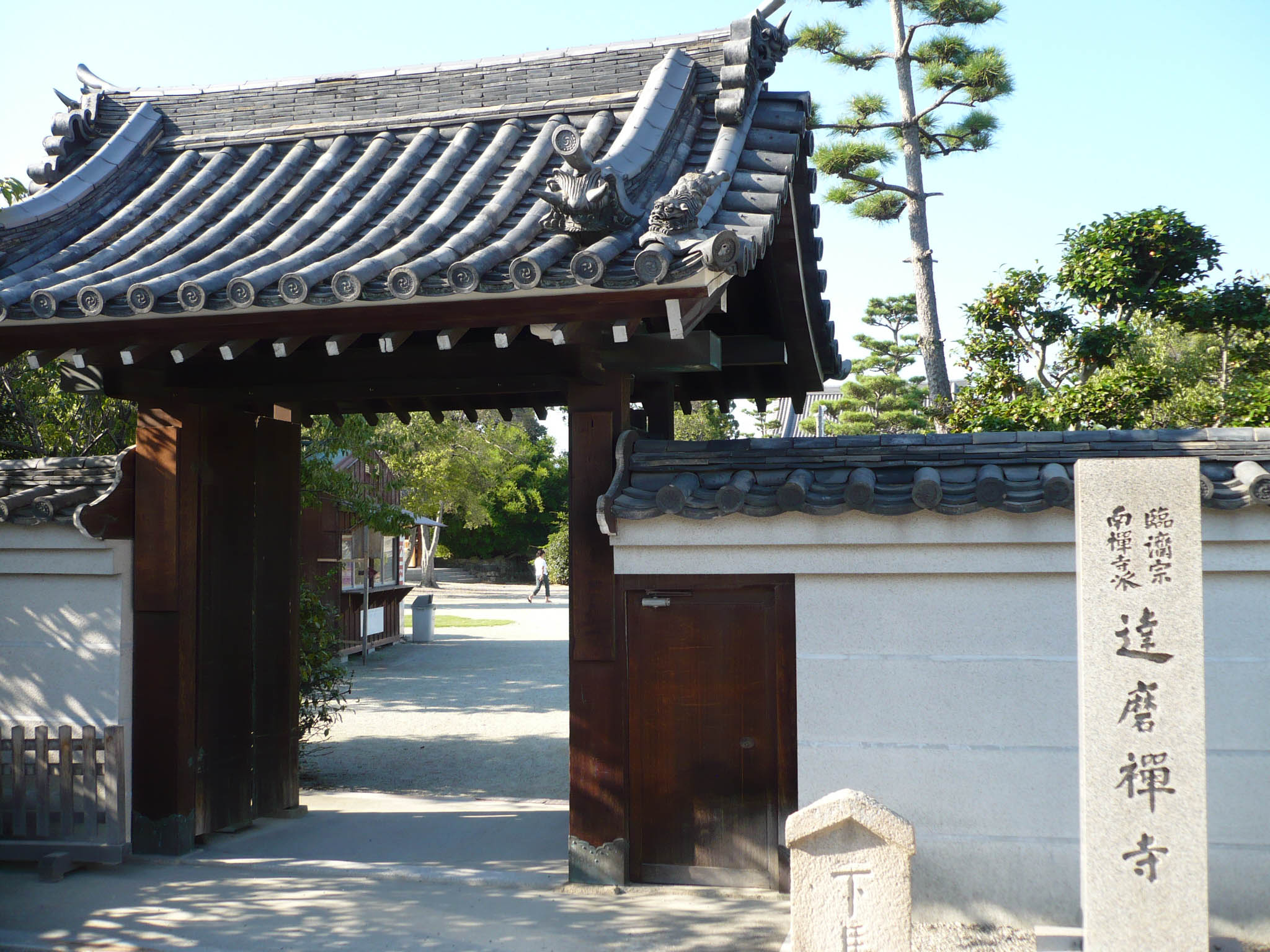
Daruma-ji

Ōji (王寺町, Ōji-chō) is a town located in Kitakatsuragi District, Nara Prefecture, Japan. As of 31 October 2024, the town had an estimated population of 23,706 in 10789 households, and a population density of 3400 persons per km^{2}. The total area of the town is 7.01 km^{2} (2.71 sq mi).

== Geography ==
Ōji is located in northwestern Nara Prefecture. It is at the lowest point of the Yamato River system in Nara Prefecture, where the Yamato River crosses the prefectural border and heads toward Osaka, and therefore has the lowest elevation in the prefecture. The town center has suffered severe damage from flooding in the past. With the Katsuragi Mountains to the west, the habitable area is not large.

=== Surrounding municipalities ===
Nara Prefecture

- Kashiba
- Kawai
- Kanmaki
- Sangō
- Ikoma
- Ikaruga

Osaka Prefecture

- Kashiwara

=== Climate ===
Ōji has a humid subtropical climate (Köppen Cfa) characterized by warm summers and cool winters with light to no snowfall. The average annual temperature in Ōji is 14.6 °C. The average annual rainfall is 1636 mm with September as the wettest month. The temperatures are highest on average in August, at around 26.1 °C, and lowest in January, at around 2.6 °C.

=== Demographics ===
Per Japanese census data, the population of Ōji is as shown below

Historical population
| Year | Pop. | ±% |
|---|---|---|
| 1940 | 6,126 | — |
| 1950 | 8,633 | +40.9% |
| 1960 | 9,507 | +10.1% |
| 1970 | 14,783 | +55.5% |
| 1980 | 17,213 | +16.4% |
| 1990 | 23,625 | +37.3% |
| 2000 | 23,782 | +0.7% |
| 2010 | 22,182 | −6.7% |
| 2020 | 24,043 | +8.4% |

== History ==
The area of Ōji was part of ancient Yamato Province. The name of the town comes from the Asuka period temple of Hōkō-ji (Kataoka-oji Temple), which was built by Prince Shōtoku. Currently, Hōkō-ji is located at the southern foot of Mount Kataoka, was originally located near Oji Elementary School, where archaeological excavations were conducted in conjunction with the widening of Japan National Route 168. The town of Ōji was established on April 1, 1889, with the creation of the modern municipalities system. It was raised to town status on February 11, 1926.

== Government ==
Ōji has a mayor-council form of government with a directly elected mayor and a unicameral town council of 12 members. Ōji, collectively with the other municipalities in Kitakatsuragi district contributes three members to the Nara Prefectural Assembly. In terms of national politics, the town is part of the Nara 2nd district of the lower house of the Diet of Japan.

== Economy ==
Ōji is a regional commercial center and is largely a commuter town for the greater Osaka metropolis.

== Education ==
Ōji has two public combined elementary/junior high schools operated by the town government and one public high school operated by the Nara Prefectural Board of Education. The private junior college Hakuho College, is located in Ōji.

== Transportation ==
=== Railways ===
JR West - Yamatoji Line

Q Ōji

JR West - Wakayama Line

T Ōji - Hatakeda

Kintetsu Railway - Ikoma Line

Ōji -

Kintetsu Railway - Tawaramoto Line

Shin-Ōji

=== Highways ===
- National Route 25
- National Route 168

== Local attractions ==
- Daruma-ji
