= Shinjuku Expressway Bus Terminal =

Bus terminal in Japan

Coordinates: 35.68881°N 139.70069°E

Shinjuku Expressway Bus Terminal バスタ新宿
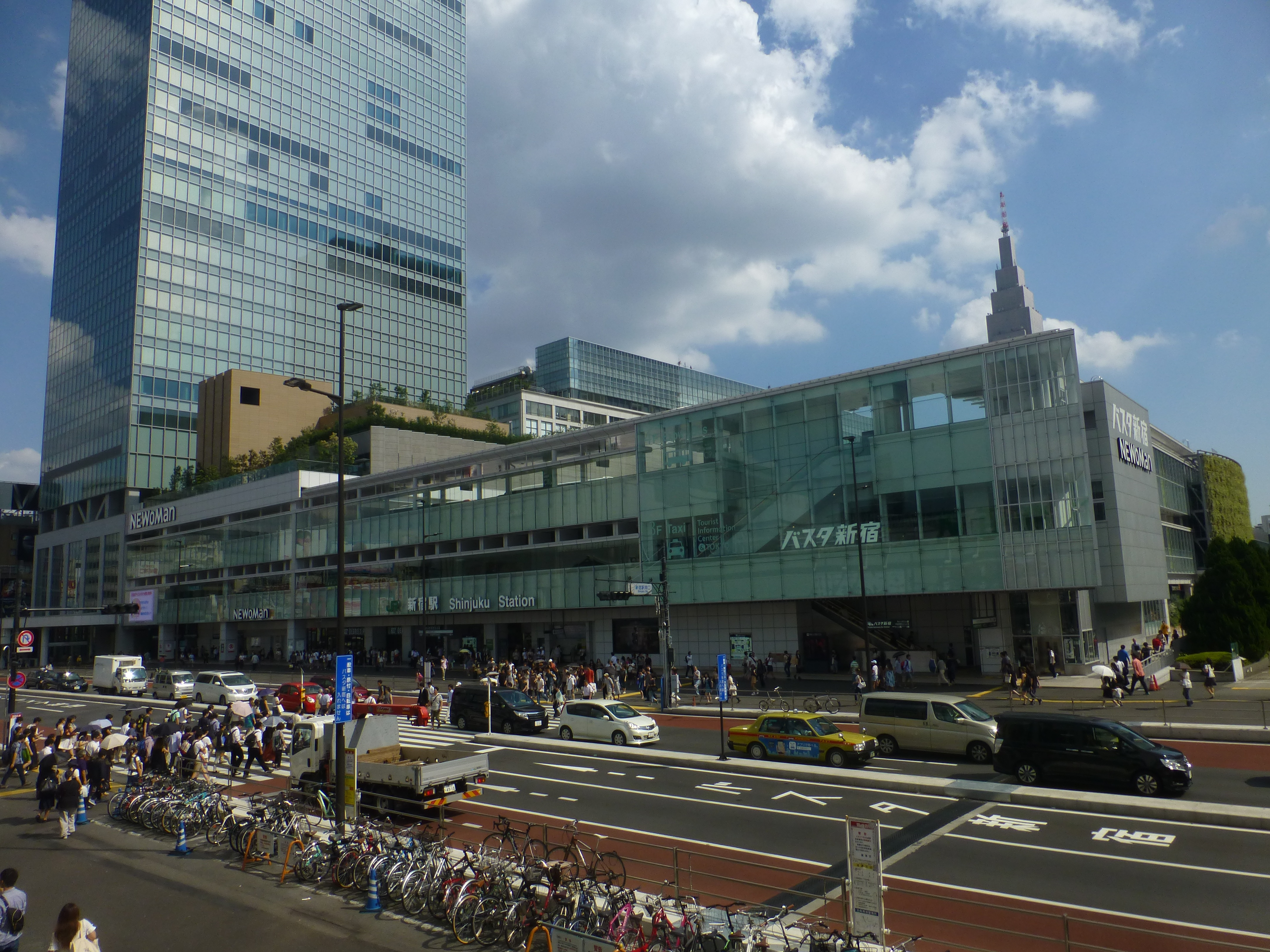

General information
- Location: Across the Kōshū Kaidō from Shinjuku Station. Sendagaya, Shibuya, Tokyo; Japan
- Operator: Shinjuku Expressway Bus Terminal Co., Ltd.
- Platforms: 15
- Bus routes: 207
- Bus operators: 118
- Connections: Shinjuku Station

Other information
- Website: shinjuku-busterminal.co.jp/en/

History
- Opened: 4 April 2016

Passengers
- 38,000 (a day)
Location

Shinjuku Expressway Bus Terminal or Busta Shinjuku (バスタ新宿) is a major bus terminal that opened at Shinjuku Station South on 4 April 2016. It is the first integrated bus terminal in Greater Tokyo, and the largest in Japan, serving once scattered companies.
