= Tawaramoto Line =

Railway line in Nara Prefecture, Japan

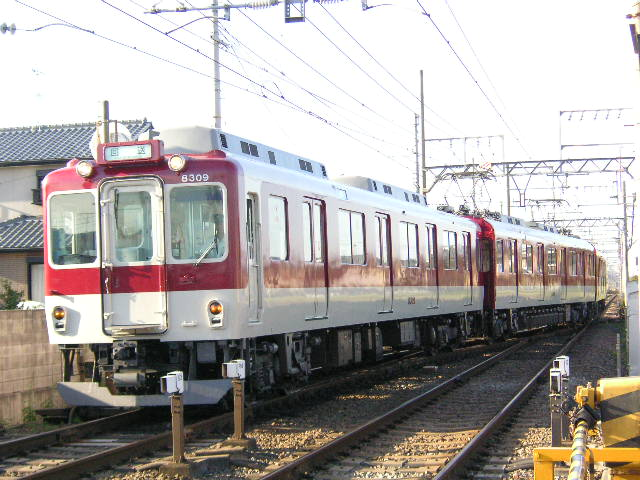

Overview
- Native name: 田原本線
- Owner: Kintetsu Railway
- Line number: I
- Locale: Tawaramoto, Nara, Japan; Miyake, Nara, Japan; Kōryō, Nara, Japan; Kawai, Nara, Japan; Ōji, Nara, Japan
- Termini: Nishi-Tawaramoto Station; Shin-Ōji Station
- Stations: 8
- Color on map: (#E7A61A)

Service
- Type: Commuter rail
- System: Kintetsu Railway
- Operator(s): Kintetsu Railway

History
- Opened: 26 April 1918; 106 years ago
- Last extension: 1 May 1928; 96 years ago

Technical
- Track length: 10.1 km (6.3 mi)
- Number of tracks: Single-track
- Character: Commuter rail
- Track gauge: 1,435 mm (4 ft 8 1/2 in) standard gauge
- Electrification: 1,500 V DC (overhead lines)
- Operating speed: 65 km/h (40 mph)
- Signalling: Automatic closing block
- Train protection system: Kintetsu ATS

The Tawaramoto Line (田原本線, Tawaramoto sen) is a railway line owned and operated by the Kintetsu Railway, a Japanese private railway company, connecting Ōji Station (Nara) (Ōji, Nara Prefecture) and Nishi-Tawaramoto Station (Tawaramoto, Nara Prefecture) in Japan.

The line does not connect directly with other Kintetsu Lines, however both terminals are located within walking distance of nearby Kintetsu stations on other lines.

== History ==
The Yamato Railway Co. opened the Shin-Oji - Nishi-Tawaramoto section in 1918 as a 1067mm gauge line, extending the line to Sakurai on current Kintetsu Osaka Line in 1923. Services on the Nishi-Tawaramoto - Sakurai section ceased in 1944 as a war-time austerity measure, with the section formally closing in 1958. The right-of-way for this section was subsequently converted to a road, as Nara Prefectural Route 14.

The Shin-Oji - Nishi-Tawaramoto section was regauged to 1435mm and electrified at 600 VDC in 1948, and the company merged with Kintetsu in 1964. The line voltage was increased to 1500 VDC in 1969.

== Stations ==
No.	Station	Distance (km)	Connections	Location	
I36	Nishi-Tawaramoto 西田原本	0.0	B Kashihara Line (B36: Tawaramoto)	Tawaramoto, Shiki	Nara
I37	Kuroda 黒田	2.0		Tawaramoto, Shiki	Nara
I38	Tajima 但馬	3.0		Miyake, Shiki	Nara
I39	Hashio 箸尾	4.5		Kōryō, Kitakatsuragi	Nara
I40	Ikebe 池部	6.1		Kawai, Kitakatsuragi	Nara
I41	Samitagawa 佐味田川	7.1		Kawai, Kitakatsuragi	Nara
I42	Ōwada 大輪田	8.2		Kawai, Kitakatsuragi	Nara
I43	Shin-Ōji 新王寺	10.1	G Ikoma Line (G28: Ōji); Q Yamatoji Line (JR-Q31: Ōji); T Wakayama Line (Ōji)	Ōji, Kitakatsuragi	Nara
