= Kawai, Nara =

Kawai 河合町
- Town
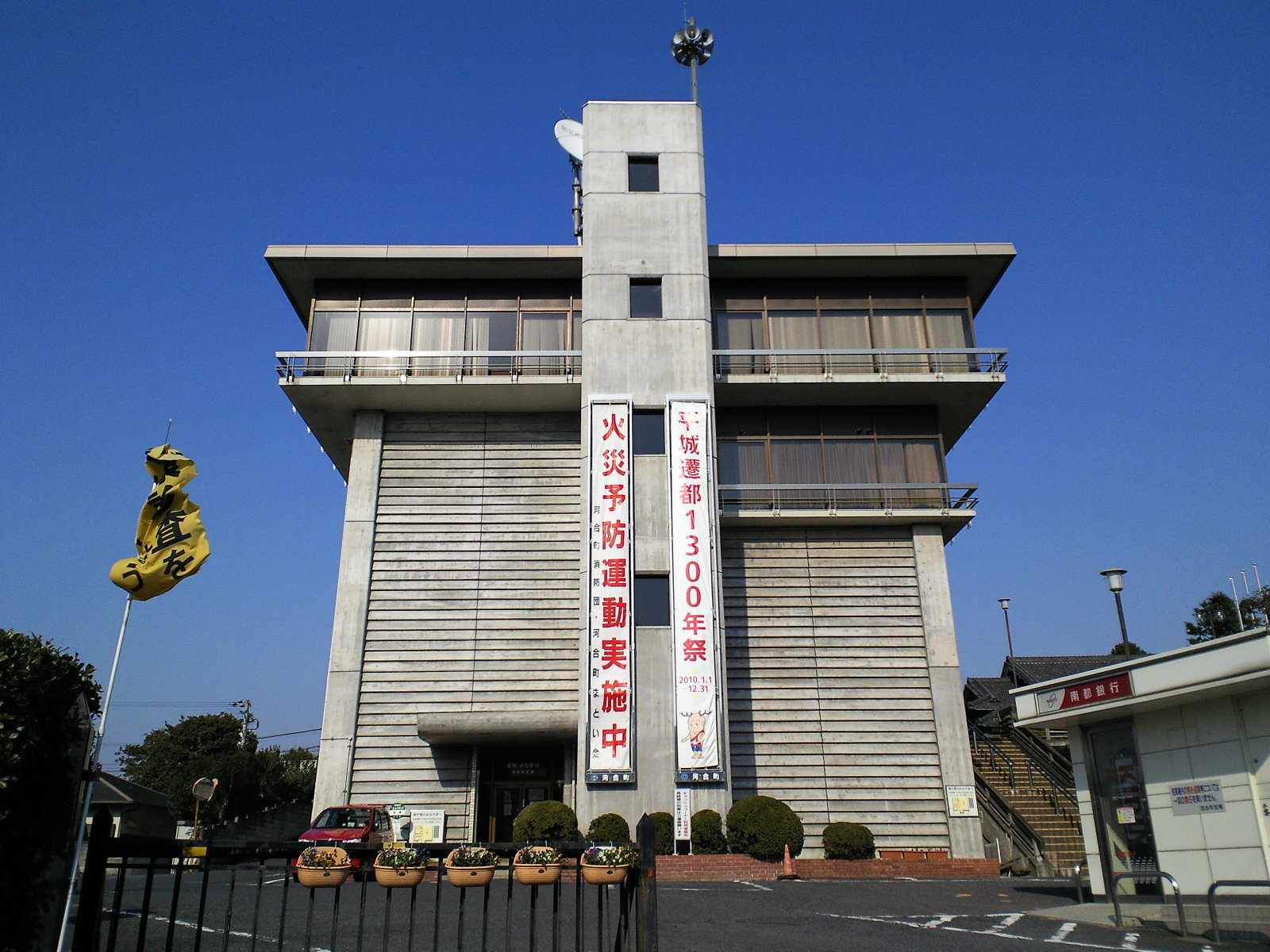
- Kawai Town Hall

- Flag Chapter
- Interactive map of Kawai
- Location in Japan
- Coordinates: 34°34′42″N 135°44′12″E
- Country: Japan
- Region: Kansai
- Prefecture: Nara
- District: Kitakatsuragi

Area
  - Total: 8.23 km^{2} (3.18 sq mi)

Population (November 30, 2024)
  - Total: 16,636
  - Density: 2,020/km^{2} (5,240/sq mi)
- Time zone: UTC+09:00 (JST)
- City hall address: 1-1 Ikebe, Kawai-cho, Kitakatsuragi-gun, Nara-ken 636-8501
- Website: Official website
- Symbols
- Flower: Adonis
- Tree: Camellia sasanqua

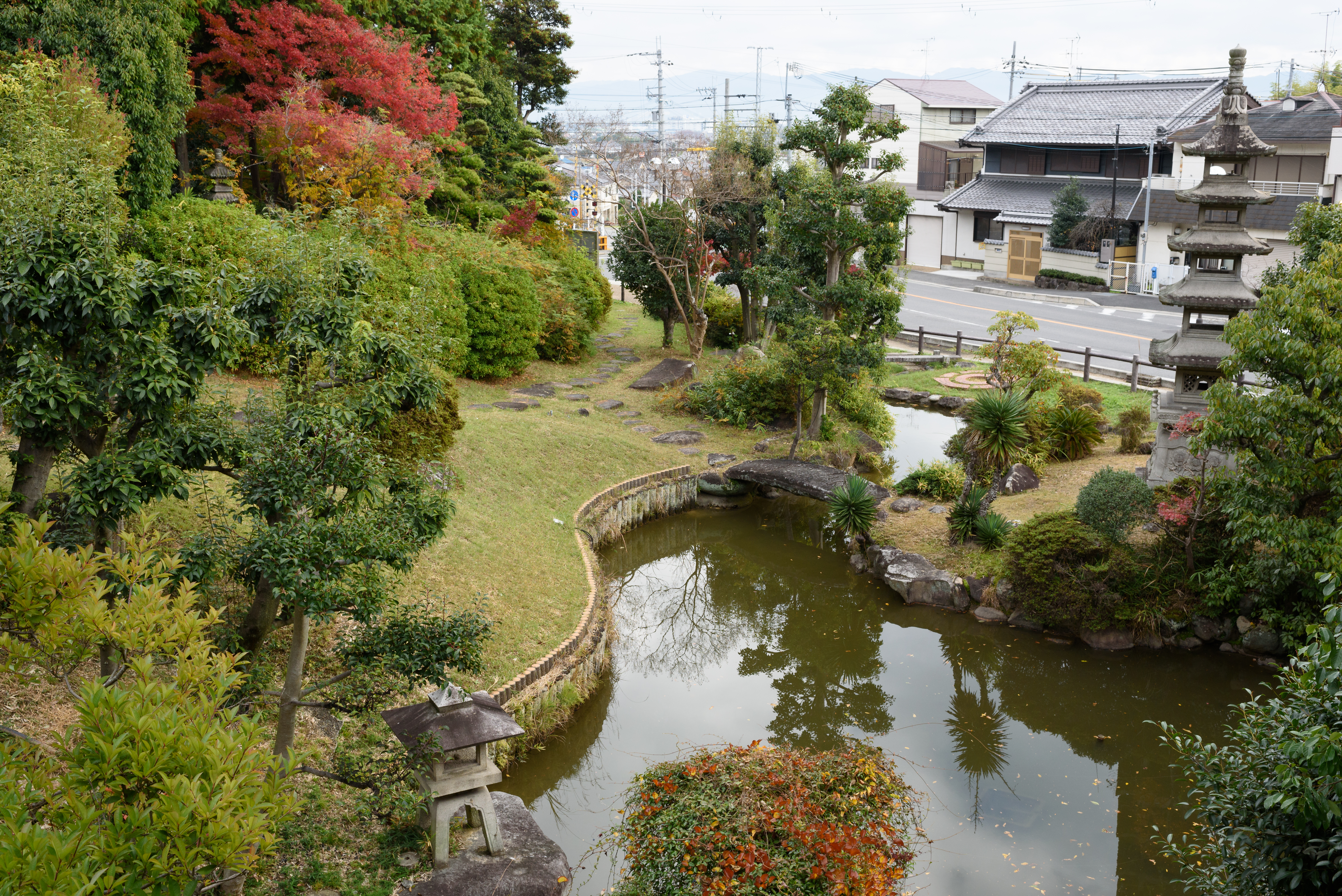
Kawai Town Office gardens

Kawai (河合町, Kawai-chō) is a town located in Kitakatsuragi District, Nara Prefecture, Japan. As of 30 September 2024, the town had an estimated population of 16,636 in 7968 households, and a population density of 2000 persons per km^{2}. The total area of the town is 8.23 km^{2} (3.18 sq mi).

== Geography ==
Kawai is located in the flatlands of northeast Nara Prefecture in the Nara Basin.

=== Surrounding municipalities ===
Nara Prefecture

- Ōji
- Kanmaki
- Kōryō
- Ikaruga
- Kawanishi
- Miyake
- Ando

=== Climate ===
Kawai has a humid subtropical climate (Köppen Cfa) characterized by warm summers and cool winters with light to no snowfall. The average annual temperature in Kawai is 14.6 °C. The average annual rainfall is 1636 mm with September as the wettest month. The temperatures are highest on average in August, at around 26.7 °C, and lowest in January, at around 3.1 °C.

=== Demographics ===
Per Japanese census data, the population of Kawai is as shown below

Historical population
Year	Pop.	±%
1940	5,470	—
1950	6,644	+21.5%
1960	6,546	−1.5%
1970	7,693	+17.5%
1980	15,793	+105.3%
1990	19,408	+22.9%
2000	20,126	+3.7%
2010	18,531	−7.9%
2020	17,018	−8.2%

== History ==
The area of Kawai was part of ancient Yamato Province, and many kofun burial mounds are located within the town. From the 11th to the 14th century, the area was a shōen landed estate controlled by the temple of Tōdai-ji. The village of Kawai was established on April 1, 1889, with the creation of the modern municipalities system. It was elevated to town status on December 1, 1971.

== Government ==
Kawai has a mayor-council form of government with a directly elected mayor and a unicameral town council of 12 members. Kawai, collectively with the other municipalities of Kitakatsuragi District, contributes three members to the Nara Prefectural Assembly. In terms of national politics, the town is part of the Nara 2nd district of the lower house of the Diet of Japan.

== Economy ==
The local economy is based on agriculture and light manufacturing.

== Education ==
Kawai has two public elementary schools and Two public junior high school operated by the town government and one public high school operated by the Nara Prefectural Board of Education. There is also one private high school.

== Transportation ==
=== Railways ===
Kintetsu Railway - Tawaramoto Line

Ōwada - Samitagawa - Ikebe

=== Highways ===
- Nishi-Meihan Expressway

== Sister cities ==
- Majuro, Marshall Islands

== Local attractions ==
- Nagareyama Kofun, National Historic Site
- Samida Takarazuka Kofun, National Historic Site
- Ōtsukayama Kofun Cluster, National Historic Site
