= Shiki District, Nara =

District in Nara prefecture, Japan

Coordinates: 34.5640°N 135.788°E

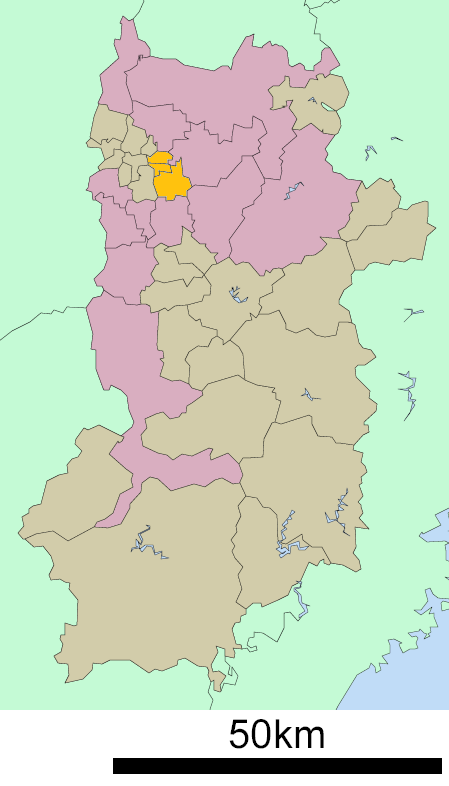
Location of Shiki District in Nara Prefecture

Shiki (磯城郡, Shiki-gun) is a district located in Nara Prefecture, Japan.

As of 2003, the district has an estimated population of 50,009 and a density of 1,607.49 persons per km^{2}. The total area is 31.11 km^{2}.

In ancient times, Sakurai City was also located in this area, and the palace of the ancient emperor was located there.

== Towns and villages ==
- Kawanishi
- Miyake
- Tawaramoto
