= Ōji Station (Nara) =

Railway station in Ōji, Nara Prefecture, Japan

Ōji Station 王寺駅
- JR-West's West Gate (left) and Kintetsu's exit / entrance (right)

General information
- Location: 6-10, Kudo 2-chōme, (JR West) （久度二丁目6-10） 4-20, Kudo 3-chōme (Kintetsu) （久度三丁目4-20） Ōji Town, Kitakatsuragi District, Nara Prefecture （奈良県北葛城郡王寺町） Japan
- Coordinates: JR West: 34°35′50.75″N 135°42′14.24″E; Kintetsu Railway: 34°35′51.78″N 135°42′15.52″E
- System: commuter rail station
- Owner: JR West; Kintetsu Railway
- Operator: JR West; Kintetsu Railway
- Lines: Q Yamatoji Line (V Kansai Line); T Wakayama Line; G Ikoma Line
- Platforms: 4 island platforms
- Tracks: 8
- Bus stands: 8 (1 alighting only, 2 storage)
- Connections: North Gate: I Tawaramoto Line at Shin-Ōji Station; JR Bus Kanto / West Japan JR Bus: Seishun eco Dream 4-go / 21-go (Tokyo Sta. / Shinjuku—Kyoto / Nara / Oji Sta. Route); Premium Dream 12-go / 11-go (Tokyo Disneyland / Tokyo Sta.—Kyoto / Nara / Oji Sta. Route) at West Japan JR Bus' Gate; Nara Kotsu Bus Lines: 28 / 29, 42 / 43, 62, 63, 80, and 82 at Oji Sta. (North) Bus Gate; South Gate: Keisei Bus / Nara Kotsu Bus Lines: Yamato-gō (Tokyo Disney Resort / Ueno / Yokohama—Nara Goidō Route) at Bus Gate 1; Nara Kotsu Bus Lines: 21 / 23 (morning only) at Bus Gate 1; 2 / 5, 3 / 15, 4, 6, 13 / 17 / 19, and 16 at Bus Gate 2; 10, 12, and 21 / 23 at Bus Gate 3

Construction
- Structure type: At grade

Other information
- Station code: JR West: Q31; Kintetsu Railway: G28

History
- Opened: JR West: 27 December 1890 (135 years ago); Kintetsu Railway: 16 May 1922 (104 years ago)

Services
Preceding station	JRW	Following station
Yamatoji Line (Kansai Main Line)
Hōryūji	Local	Sangō
Hōryūji	Regional Rapid Service	Kyūhōji
Hōryūji	Rapid Service	Kyūhōji
Hōryūji	Yamatoji Rapid Service	Kyūhōji
Hōryūji	Direct Rapid Service	Kyūhōji
Wakayama Line
Terminus	Local	Hatakeda
through to Yamatoji Line	Rapid Service	Hatakeda
Preceding station	Kintetsu Railway	Following station
Ikoma Line
Shigisanshita	Local	Terminus
Location

Ōji Station (王寺駅, Ōji-eki) is a railway station in Ōji, Nara, Japan. Operated by West Japan Railway Company (JR-West) and Kintetsu Railway, it is one of the four oldest railway stations in Nara Prefecture, and forms a major junction in the region. The station serves the Yamatoji Line (Kansai Main Line), and is the terminus for the Wakayama Line and Kintetsu Ikoma Line.

Kintetsu's station has a stationmaster who administrates between Motosanjoguchi Station and the station on the Ikoma Line and all stations on the Tawaramoto Line. The nearby Shin-Ōji Station (新王寺駅, Shin-Ōji-eki) is also the terminus for Kintetsu Tawaramoto Line.

== Station layout ==
=== JR-West platforms and tracks ===
The JR West station has one side platform and two island platforms, serving five tracks at ground level.

1	■ Yamatoji Line	for Nara and Kamo
1	■ Wakayama Line	from the Yamatoji Line for Takada and Gojō
2	■ Yamatoji Line	from Nara for Tennōji, JR Namba and Osaka
3	■ Yamatoji Line	for Tennōji, JR Namba and Osaka
3	■ Wakayama Line	for Takada, Gojō and Wakayama; Man-yō Mahoroba Line for Sakurai
4	■ Wakayama Line	for Takada, Gojō and Wakayama; Man-yō Mahoroba Line for Sakurai
4	■ Yamatoji Line	from the Wakayama Line for Tennōji and JR Namba
5	■ Wakayama Line	for Takada, Gojō and Wakayama; Man-yō Mahoroba Line for Sakurai

JR-West's platforms

JR-West's North Gate

=== Kintetsu Railway platform and tracks ===
The Kintetsu station consists of a bay platform serving two tracks at ground level.

	Street level	Exit / entrance, a bicycle facility, and both taxi and bus stands.
Platform level	Track 2	← G Ikoma Line ■ Local for Ikoma
Platform level	Partial bay platform, doors will open on the left or the right
Platform level	Track 1	← G Ikoma Line ■ Local for Ikoma	Public washrooms

== Shin-Ōji Station ==
Shin-Ōji Station 新王寺駅
- The station gate

General information
- Location: 1-1 Kudo 2-chome, Ōji Town, Kitakatsuragi District, Nara Prefecture, Japan
- Coordinates: 34°35′51.78″N 135°42′15.52″E
- System: Kintetsu Railway commuter rail station
- Owner: Kintetsu Railway
- Operator: Kintetsu Railway
- Line: I Tawaramoto Line
- Distance: 10.1 km (6.3 miles)
- Platforms: 2 bay platforms
- Tracks: 1
- Connections: Q Yamatoji Line (V Kansai Line); T Wakayama Line; G Ikoma Line; at Ōji Station

Construction
- Structure type: At grade
- Parking: None
- Cycle facilities: Available
- Accessible: Yes

Other information
- Station code: I43
- Website: www.kintetsu.co.jp/station/station_info/en_station12005.html

History
- Opened: 26 April 1918 (108 years ago)

Services
Preceding station	Kintetsu Railway	Following station
Terminus	Tawaramoto Line	Ōwada towards Nishi-Tawaramoto
Location

=== Platforms and track ===
The station consists of two bay platforms serving a single track at ground level. The north platform is used for boarding and the south platform is used for alighting.

	Street level	Exit / entrance, a bicycle facility, and both taxi and bus stands.
Platform level		Bay platform, doors will open on the left
Platform level	Track	I Tawaramoto Line ■ Local for Nishi-Tawaramoto →
Platform level		Bay platform, doors will open only for alighting
