= Nara Kotsu Bus Lines =

Japanese bus operator

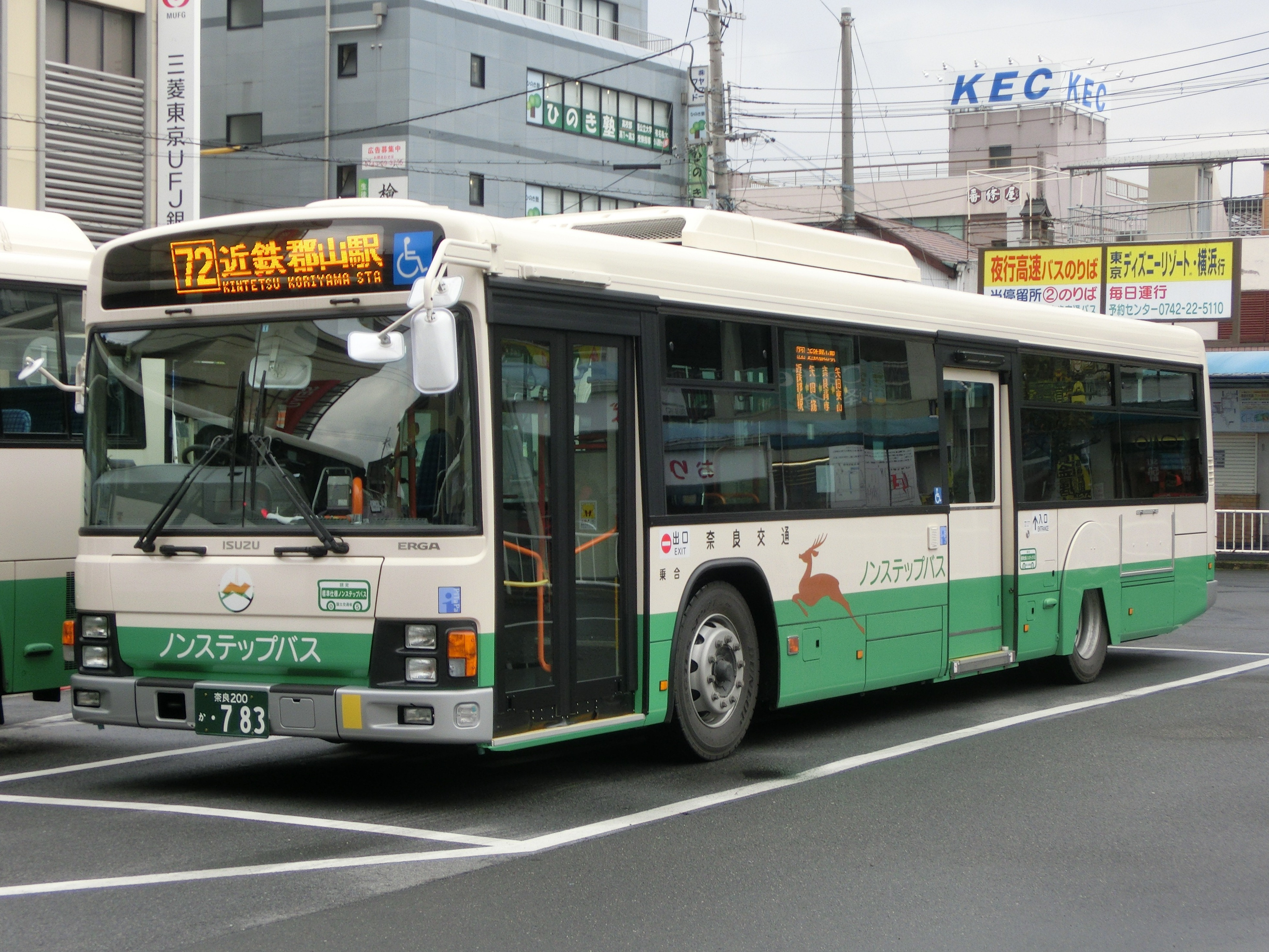
- Isuzu Erga on Route 72 at Kintetsu-Koriyama Sta.
- Parent: Kintetsu Bus Holdings Co., Ltd.
- Founded: January 20, 1929; 97 years ago
- Headquarters: 1 chome 25-12, Omiya-cho, Nara, Nara, Japan
- Locale: Japan
- Service area: Local: Nara, Kyoto, Osaka, and Wakayama; Airport: Osaka; Intercity: Aichi, Chiba, Kanagawa, and Tokyo
- Service type: Local, sightseeing, airport, intercity, tour, charter, and contract bus services
- Alliance: Intercity routes shared by Kanto Bus, Keisei Bus, and Meitetsu Bus
- Routes: 179
- Stops: N/A
- Destinations: Kansai Int'l Airport; Osaka (Itami) Airport; Nagoya; Shinjuku; Tokyo Disney Resort; Yokohama
- Hubs: Kintetsu-Nara Sta.; JR Nara Sta.; Tenri Sta.; Sakurai Sta.; Yagi Sta.; Takada Sta.
- Stations: Kintetsu-Nara Sta.; JR Nara Sta.; Sakurai Sta.; Yagi Sta.; Kashiharajingu Sta.; Gakuenmae Sta. North Ex.; Gakuenmae Sta. South Ex.; Gakken-Nara-Tomigaoka Sta.; Oji Sta.; Takanohara Sta.; Yamadagawa Sta.; Hosono Sta.
- Lounge: None
- Depots: Nara; Heijo; Kitayamato; Nishiyamato; Haibara; Katsuragi; Yoshino; Totsugawa; Kyoto
- Fleet: 795: Isuzu Erga; Hino Blue Ribbon; Isuzu Cubic; Isuzu Gala; Hino S'elega
- Daily ridership: 142,000 passengers per day approx.
- Annual ridership: 51,830,000 passengers per year approx.
- Fuel type: Diesel and Compressed Natural Gas
- Operator: Nara Kotsu Bus Lines Co., Ltd.
- President and CEO (Daihyō torishimariyaku shachō): Muneo Taniguchi
- Website: www.narakotsu.co.jp

'Nara Kotsu Bus Lines Co., Ltd. (奈良交通株式会社, Nara Kōtsu kabushiki gaisha), more commonly simply Nara Kotsu (奈良交通, Nara Kōtsu), is a Japanese bus operator that provides scheduled local services in Nara Prefecture, the southern part of Kyoto Prefecture, the southeastern part of Wakayama Prefecture, and the central part of Osaka Prefecture.

The company also provides scheduled sightseeing bus services within Nara, airport bus services to and from Kansai International Airport and Itami Airport, and intercity bus services to and from Chiba, Nagoya, Tokyo, and Yokohama. Charter, tour, and contract bus services are also provided.

== History ==
Nara Kotsu traces its origin back to 1929 when Nara Auto Co., Ltd. (奈良自動車株式会社, Nara Jidōsha kabushiki gaisha) was founded in Nara City. The bus operator eventually has become the surviving entity and a sole operator in the prefecture since merging with Fugen Nanwa Omnibus, Omine Auto, Yoshino Auto, and Yoshino-Uda Transit on July 1, 1943.
