= Nishi-Tawaramoto Station =

Railway station in Tawaramoto, Nara Prefecture, Japan

Nishi-Tawaramoto Station 西田原本駅
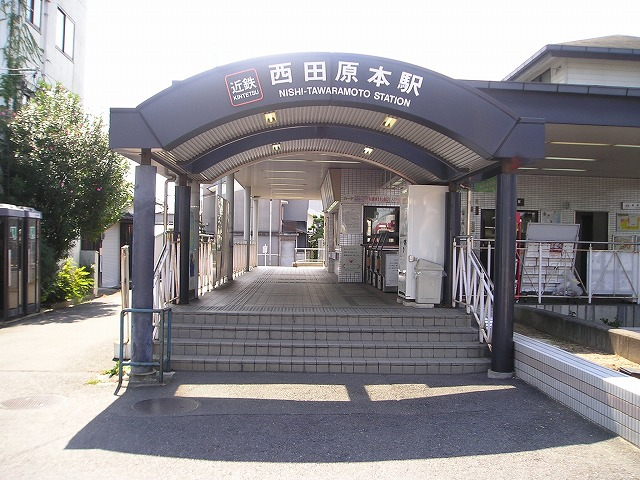
- Nishi-Tawaramoto Station

General information
- Location: 202-2, Tonomachi, Tawaramoto-cho, Shiki-gun, Nara-ken 636-0317; Japan
- Coordinates: 34°33′13.09″N 135°47′22.75″E
- System: Kintetsu Railway commuter rail station
- Owner: Kintetsu Railway
- Operator: Kintetsu Railway
- Line: I Tawaramoto Line
- Distance: 0 km (0 miles)
- Platforms: 2 bay platform (partial); 1 side platform (disused)
- Tracks: 3
- Train operators: Kintetsu Railway
- Bus stands: 1
- Connections: B Kashihara Line at Tawaramoto Station; Nara Kotsu Bus Lines: 21 at Tawaramoto Bus Center

Construction
- Structure type: At grade
- Parking: Available
- Cycle facilities: Available
- Accessible: Yes

Other information
- Station code: I36
- Website: www.kintetsu.co.jp/station/station_info/en_station12012.html

History
- Opened: April 26, 1918 (108 years ago)
- Electrified: 1948
- Former names: Kinki-Nippon Tawaramoto (until October 1, 1964)

Passengers
- 2019: 720 daily
Services
Preceding station	Kintetsu Railway	Following station
Kuroda towards Shin-Ōji	Tawaramoto Line	Terminus
B Kashihara Line
Iwami towards Kyōto, Shin-Tanabe or Yamato-Saidaiji	Local transfer at Tawaramoto	Kasanui towards Kashiharajingū-mae
Hirahata towards Kyōto or Yamato-Saidaiji	Express transfer at Tawaramoto	Kashiharajingū-mae Terminus
Location
- Location within Nara Prefecture Location within Japan

Nishi-Tawaramoto Station (西田原本駅, Nishi-Tawaramoto-eki) is a passenger railway station located in the town of Tawaramoto, Nara Prefecture, Japan. It is operated by the private transportation company Kintetsu Railway.

== Line ==
Nishi-Tawaramoto Station is the terminus of the Tawaramoto Line and is10.1 kilometers from the opposing terminus of the line at Shin-Ōji.

== Layout ==
The station is a ground-level station with one terminal bay platform and two tracks. The station building is located at the train stop, and there is also a waiting room on the platform. The station is attended.

== Platforms and tracks ==
	Street level	Exit / entrance, parking lots, and both taxi and bus stands.
Platform level	Track 2	← I Tawaramoto Line ■ Local for Shin-Ōji
Platform level	Partial bay platform, doors will open on the left or the right		Public washrooms
Platform level	Track 1	← I Tawaramoto Line ■ Local for Shin-Ōji
Platform level	Track	Disused
Platform level	Side platform, disused

== Gallery ==
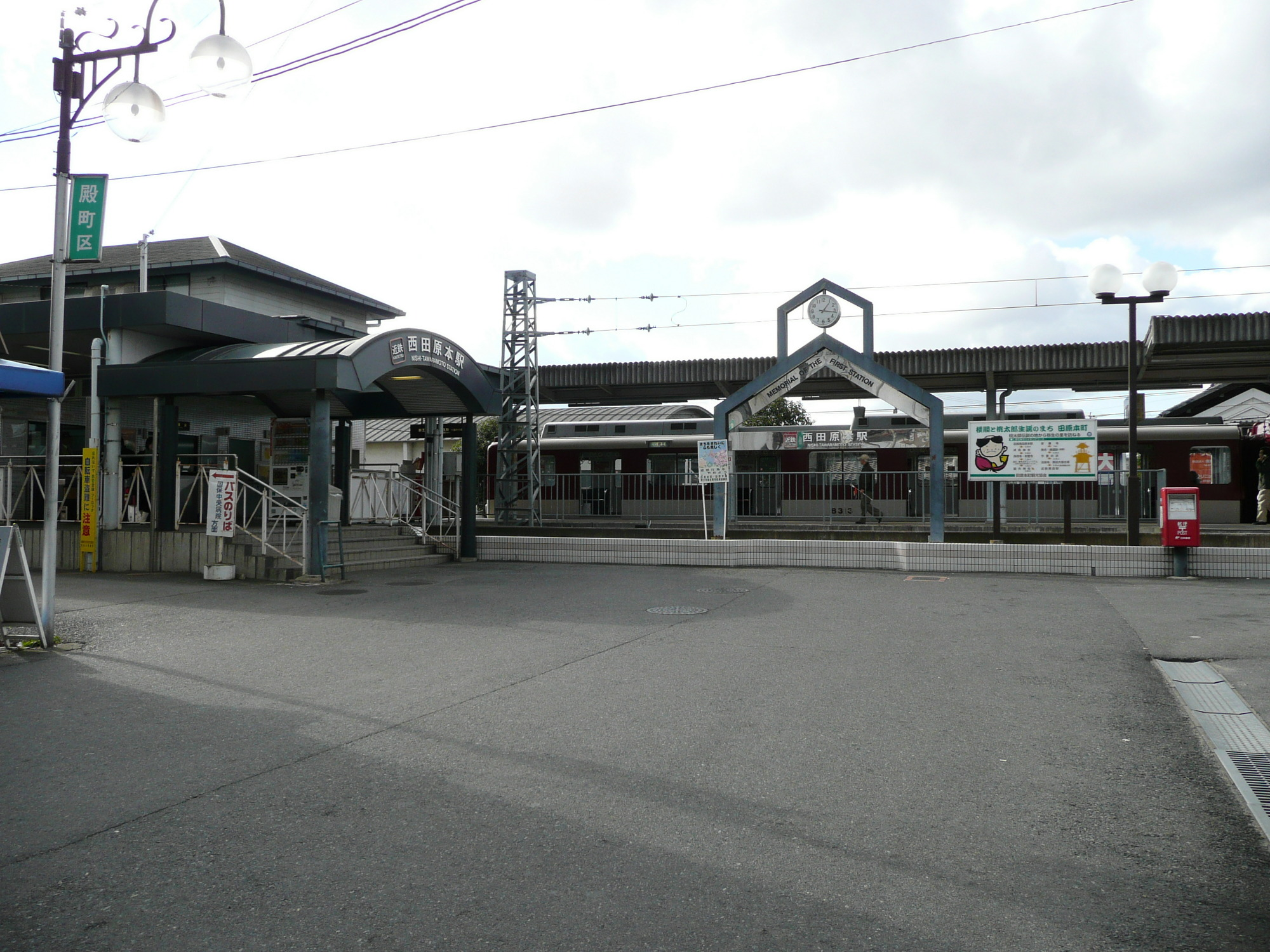

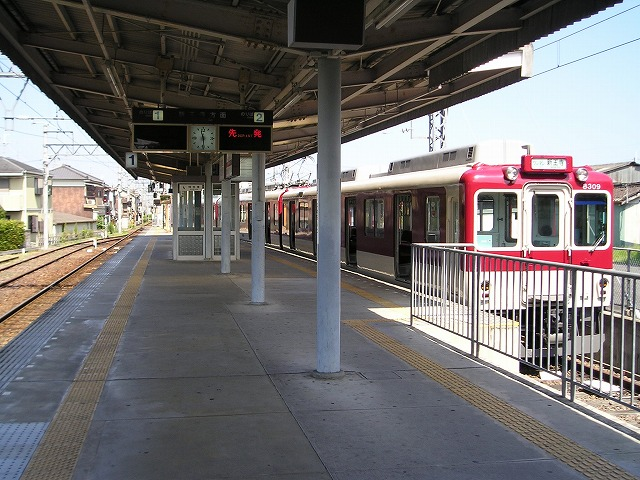

== History ==
- 1918 Apr. 16 - Tawaramoto Station was opened by the Yamato Railway, while another Tawaramoto Station was opened by the Osaka Electric Tramway in 1923.
- 1944 Jan. 11 - Train services between Tawaramoto and Sakurai was discontinued.
- 1958 The discontinued section between Tawaramoto and Sakurai was abandoned.
- 1964 Oct. 1 - The Shigi Ikoma Electric Railway acquired the Yamato Railways.
- 1964 Oct. 1 - The Kintetsu Railway acquired the Shigi Ikoma Electric Railway, then Tawaramoto Station was renamed to Nishi-Tawaramoto.
- 2007 Apr. 1 - PiTaPa, a reusable contactless stored value smart card, has been available.

== Passenger statistics ==
In fiscal 2019, the station was used by an average of 720 passengers daily (boarding passengers only).

== Surrounding area ==
- Tawaramoto Station
- Tawaramoto Town Hall

== See also ==
- List of railway stations in Japan
