= February 1915 =

Month of 1915

<<	February 1915					>>
Su	Mo	Tu	We	Th	Fr	Sa
	1	2	3	4	5	6
7	8	9	10	11	12	13
14	15	16	17	18	19	20
21	22	23	24	25	26	27
28

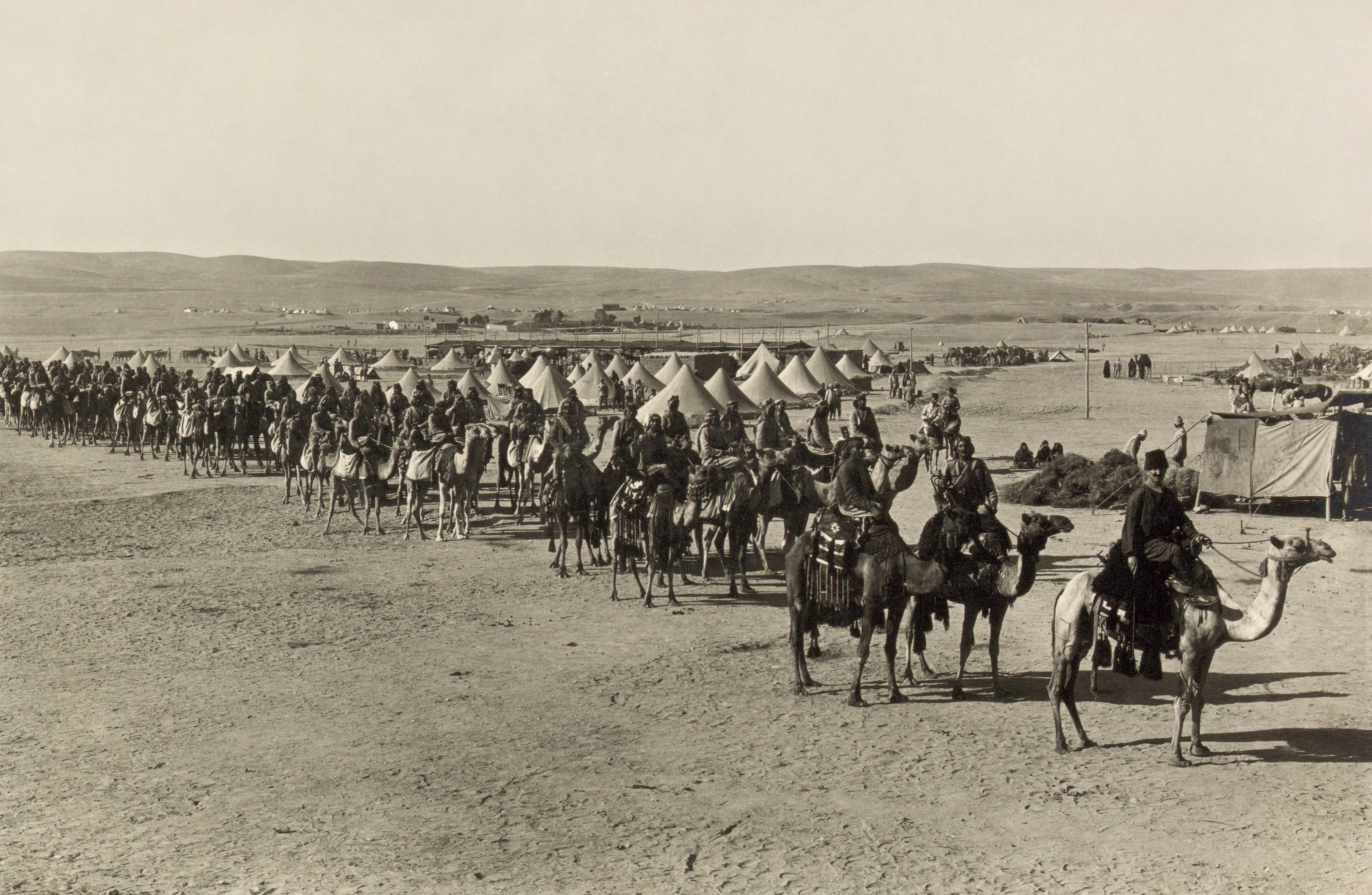
Ottoman camel corps during the Raid on the Suez Canal.

The following events occurred in February 1915:

== February 1, 1915 (Monday) ==
- Raid on the Suez Canal — An Ottoman force of over 13,000 laid siege to the Suez Canal.
- The Royal Flying Corps established No. 17 Squadron for service in the Middle East.
- The 57th Infantry Regiment for the Ottoman Empire was established, and would be known for making an incredible sacrifice during the Gallipoli campaign four months later.
- William Fox established film studio Fox Film, a precursor to 20th Century Fox, in Fort Lee, New Jersey. The film studio had its own film laboratory named De Luxe, which was sold in the 1930s and developed to become Deluxe Entertainment Services Group.
- The women's private school Auckland Presbyterian College for Ladies was established in Auckland but was renamed soon after by the school's first principal Isobel Macdonald to St Cuthbert's College.
- The Great Western Railway closed rail stations Old Oak Lane, Park Royal, and Perivale in London.
- Irish writer Helen Waddell's first play, The Spoiled Buddha, premiered at the Opera House, Belfast, by the Ulster Literary Society.
- Born:
  - Stanley Matthews, English association football player, forward for England national football team from 1934 to 1957, and Stoke City and Blackpool from 1932 to 1965; in Hanley, Staffordshire, England (d. 2000)
  - Alicia Rhett, American actress and painter, best known for her role as India Wilkes in Gone with the Wind; as Mary Alicia Rhett, in Savannah, Georgia, United States (d. 2014)

== February 2, 1915 (Tuesday) ==
- Raid on the Suez Canal — With an Ottoman assault likely to occur at the central part of the canal at Lake Timsah, a company of New Zealand infantry was sent to reinforce Gurkha troops already stationed at the site.
- Maritz rebellion — The remaining Boer rebels surrendered to the government of the Union of South Africa.
- 1915 Vanceboro international bridge bombing — German saboteur Werner Horn detonated a suitcase filled with dynamite on the Canadian side of the Saint Croix–Vanceboro Railway Bridge that crossed the U.S.-Canada border between New Brunswick and Maine, but only caused minor damage. Because he detonated the bomb in the early morning when temperatures were −30 °F (−34 °C) with blowing wind, a hotel proprietor where Horn was staying at connected his frostbite injuries to the reports of the bombing and contacted authorities. Horn was arrested later that day by the sheriff of Vanceboro, Maine and two Canadian officers from McAdam, New Brunswick sent to provide assistance in the bombing investigation.
- Russian seaplane carrier Orlitza was commissioned as the only Imperial Russian Navy seaplane carrier to see service in the Baltic Sea during World War I.
- Born:
  - Khushwant Singh, Indian writer, author of Train to Pakistan, recipient of the Padma Vibhushan; as Khushal Singh, in Hadali, Punjab Province, British India (present-day Punjab, Pakistan) (d. 2014)
  - Abba Eban, South African-Israeli politician, cabinet minister for the David Ben-Gurion and Levi Eshkol administrations; as Aubrey Solomon Meir Eban, in Cape Town, South Africa (d. 2002)
- Died: Curtis Guild Jr., 55, American politician, 43rd Governor of Massachusetts; died after a brief illness (b. 1860)

== February 3, 1915 (Wednesday) ==
- German forces attempted their second siege on Osowiec Fortress, a Russian-held stronghold in what is now northeastern Poland.
- Raid on the Suez Canal — Forces with the British Indian Army prevented the Ottoman Expeditionary Force from crossing the canal.
- Three of the conspirators involved in the assassination of Archduke Franz Ferdinand – Veljko Čubrilović, Danilo Ilić and Miško Jovanović – were executed by hanging.
- Fugitive rebel leader John Chilembwe, who a week earlier had led an unsuccessful uprising in British colonial Nyasaland (now Malawi) in Africa, was spotted by a police patrol and shot dead near Mulanje. In that time, another 300 rebels were captured and imprisoned, with 40 of them executed. Another 30 successfully escaped into neighboring Portuguese territory.
- The Royal Flying Corps established the No. 14 Squadron at Shoreham Airport, Lancing, West Sussex, England.
- The 4th Cavalry Brigade was established in the British Indian Army to serve domestically in British India while the original 9th Cavalry Brigade was serving on the Western Front.
- The U.S. Steamboat Inspection Service suspended the licences of captains of the river steamer Dora and competing river vessel Charm following a two-day trial involving the collision between both vessels which occurred in January on the Coquille River in Oregon. Competition between river boat company Myrtle Point Transportation Company, which owned Dora, and the Coquille River Company, which owned Charm, had been fierce the months leading up to the river accident. The investigation and trial was prompted after both crews were observed violently arguing and hurling objects at each vessel following the collision. The feud, however, continued into March and resulted in more boat collisions on the river.
- Born: Johannes Kotkas, Estonian wrestler, gold medalist at the 1952 Summer Olympics; in Kodijärve, Governorate of Livonia, Russian Empire (present-day Estonia) (d. 1998)

== February 4, 1915 (Thursday) ==
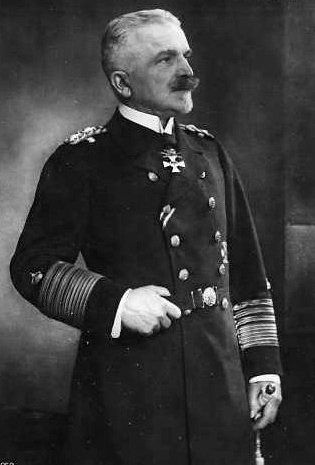
Admiral Hugo von Pohl

- Raid on the Suez Canal — After the invading Ottoman Expeditionary Forces had seemingly disappeared overnight, scouting forces of the British Indian Army ventured east of the canal and captured over 300 Ottoman soldiers while observing many of the enemy columns in retreat.
- Admiral Hugo von Pohl, commander of the High Seas Fleet, published a warning in the Deutscher Reichsanzeiger (Imperial German Gazette) that the waters around Great Britain and Ireland were now considered a war zone and that neutral vessels run the risk of being attacked by accident along with Allied shipping.
- German colonial troops attempted to capture strategic points on the Orange River in South Africa during the Battle of Kakamas, but were repelled by South African forces.
- Lieutenant W. F. Sharpe, formerly of the Canadian Aviation Corps, became the first Canadian military airman killed when his plane crashed during a training exercise for the Royal Flying Corps.
- The Ichibata Railway extended the Kita-Matsue Line in the Shimane Prefecture, Japan, with stations Nunozaki, Sono, and Ichibataguchi serving the line.
- John G. A. Kitchen patented the reversing rudder, which is now used on most boats and jet aircraft.
- Born: Norman Wisdom, English actor, known for film roles including Trouble in Store; in London, England (d. 2010)

== February 5, 1915 (Friday) ==
- Raid on the Suez Canal — British aircraft spotted and bombed a large concentration of Ottoman forces east of the Suez.
- The Mikawa Railway extended the Mikawa and Inuyama Lines in the Aichi Prefecture, Japan, with stations Hekinan-chūō and Taisanji serving each rail respectively.
- Montana created two new counties: Phillips County, Montana with its county seat in Malta, and Prairie County, Montana, with its county seat in Terry.
- German classical pianist and composer Max Reger debuted "Variations and Fugue on a Theme by Mozart" at a Berlin concert, with it becoming one of his most popular compositions.
- Born: Robert Hofstadter, American physicist, recipient of the Nobel Prize in Physics for his research on atoms and the behavior of electrons; in New York City, United States (d. 1990)

== February 6, 1915 (Saturday) ==
- British destroyer HMS Erne was driven ashore by high winds and wrecked at Rattray Head, Aberdeenshire, Scotland with all her crew surviving.
- Frustrated in delays with securing passage back to Europe, German marine commander Hellmuth von Mücke marched his force from Hodeida to Sanaa on the Arabian Peninsula to secure a ship. The group had been cut off from any help from the Imperial German Navy since their ship SMS Emden was damaged and run aground at the Battle of Cocos in the Indian Ocean, forcing the crew to hitch onto a freighter to reach the Middle East.
- The Welsh Guards was formed as one of the foot guards regiments of the British Army.
- Russian aircraft designer Igor Sikorsky demonstrated his Sikorsky S-16 in Russia, and went into operation for the Imperial Russian Air Service for 1916.
- The name for the Los Angeles-based dance academy Denishawn originated during a promotional contest for a show professional dancers Ruth St. Denis and Ted Shawn held for a performance in Portland, Oregon. The contest was to provide the name of the dance show with the contest winner receiving eight box seats in the concert hall. The uncontested winner was an amalgamation of the couple's surnames.
- W. B. Yeats wrote "On being asked for a War Poem" in a response to a request by Henry James to contribute a poetic political commentary on World War I. The poem would be first published in Edith Wharton's The Book of the Homeless in 1916 as "A Reason for Keeping Silent".
- Sporting club Príncipe was established, the oldest sports club for the African island nation of São Tomé and Príncipe.
- The Statler Hotel opened in Detroit and operated until 1975. The building was demolished in 2005.

== February 7, 1915 (Sunday) ==
- Second Battle of the Masurian Lakes — The German 8th Army launched an attack against Russian forces on the Eastern Front and began capturing the opposing side's poorly defended trenches.
- The Tenri Light Railway Company opened the Tenri Line in the Nara Prefecture, Japan with station Senzai serving the line.
- The association football club Landskrona formed from the merger of two earlier established clubs in Landskrona, Sweden.
- The Canadian Maritimes Eastern Professional Hockey League folded after the league was reduced to two teams. The league originally started as the Interprovincial Professional Hockey League with three teams before it folded and was replaced by the Maritime Professional Hockey League which had seven.
- Born: Teoctist Arăpașu, Romanian clergy, Patriarch of the Romanian Orthodox Church from 1986 to 2007; as Toader Arăpașu, in Stăuceni, Botoșani, Kimgdom of Romania (present-day Romania) (d. 2007)

== February 8, 1915 (Monday) ==
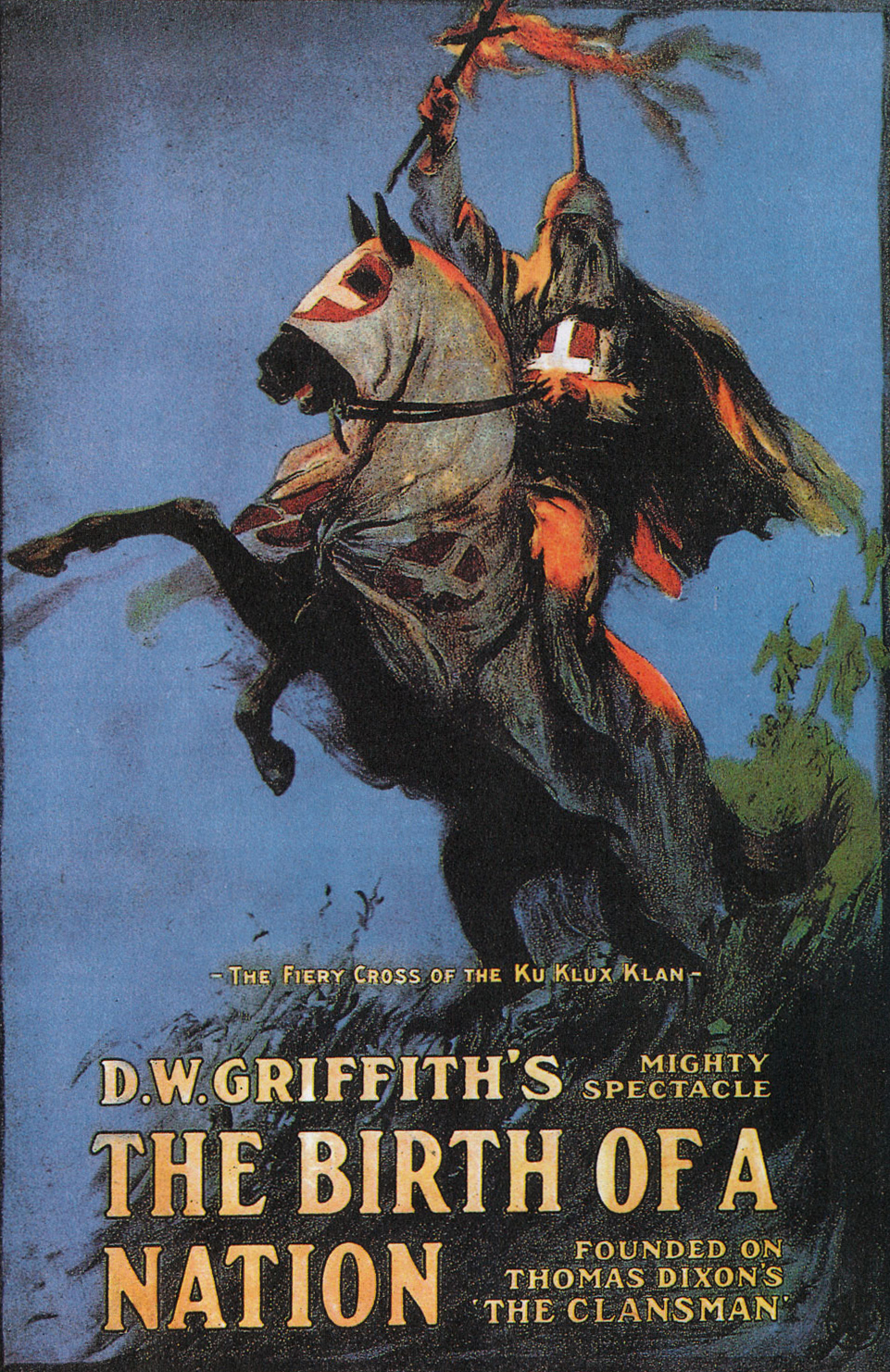
Movie poster of The Birth of a Nation.

- Second Battle of the Masurian Lakes — The German 10th Army launched their own attack against the Russian line to capitalize on the success made yesterday by the 9th Army. Despite heavy snow and bad roads slowing advances, German soldiers managed to advance 120 km (75 mi) in a week and inflict severe casualties on the Russians.
- The controversial film The Birth of a Nation, directed by D. W. Griffith and starring Lillian Gish, premiered in Los Angeles. Adapted from the novel and play The Clansman, both by Thomas Dixon Jr., the American Civil War epic became the first movie blockbuster and retained the rank of highest-grossing film ever for the next 25 years. However, the film also drew major criticism for Dixon's revisionist history of the Reconstruction era that followed the war, which portrayed the members of the Ku Klux Klan as heroic defenders of freedom and African-American males as violent and sexually aggressive towards white women. Some film historians attributed the film's popularity to a rise of Klan memberships during the late-1910s and 1920s.
- A violent wind storm weakened the structure of the Owen's electric light tower in San Jose, California. The city budgeted $5,000 in repairs but before they could be carried out, another wind storm in December toppled the tower.
- Born:
  - Archduke Robert, Austrian noble, son of the last Emperor of Austria-Hungary, Charles I of Austria; in Vienna, Austria-Hungary (present-day Austria) (d. 1996)
  - Peter Hill-Norton, British naval officer, First Sea Lord from 1970 to 1971 and Chief of the Defence Staff from 1971 to 1973, recipient of the Order of the Bath; in Germiston, South Africa (d. 2004)
  - Georges Guétary, French singer, best known for his role in An American in Paris; as Lambros Vorloou, in Alexandria, Sultanate of Egypt (present-day Egypt) (d. 1997)
  - Volkmar Wentzel, German American photographer, leading photographer for the National Geographic Society; in Dresden, Kingdom of Saxony, German Empire (present-day Saxony, Germany) (d. 2006)
- Died: Charles Vane-Tempest-Stewart, 62, British noble and politician, cabinet minister for the Arthur Balfour administration (b. 1852)

== February 9, 1915 (Tuesday) ==
- The Guards Reserve Corps of the Imperial German Army was disbanded but would be reestablished as a temporary within six months.
- The private Catholic boys school Instituto O'Higgins de Rancagua was established in Rancagua, Chile by the Marist Brothers religious order. In 2000, the school began enrolling female students.

== February 10, 1915 (Wednesday) ==
- Raid on the Suez Canal — Most of the Ottoman forces had left the Suez Canal area except for a force of 400 men. The Ottoman Expeditionary Force was estimated to have sustained over 1,500 casualties including 716 prisoners while the British recorded 32 killed and 130 wounded.
- The Royal Flying Corps established the No. 16 Squadron at Saint-Omer, France.
- The Royal Australian Naval College was established at Jervis Bay, Australia.
- The General Aeroplane Company was formed in Detroit to develop new commercial plane models. In its brief existence before it was dissolved four years later, the company developed three aircraft for World War I, including the Verville Flying Boat designed by Alfred V. Verville.
- Born: Tikka Khan, Pakistani army officer, first Chief of Army Staff for the Pakistan Army; in Kallar Syedan, British India (present-day Pakistan) (d. 2002)

== February 11, 1915 (Thursday) ==
- The Royal Navy established the Battle Cruiser Fleet, which would serve in the Battle of Jutland the following year.
- The British Army established the Tottenham Royal Engineers, who would serve all the major battles on the Western Front.
- U.S. Navy destroyer Winslow was launched by William Cramp & Sons in Philadelphia, and would primarily be involved in combating German U-boats during World War I.
- The London Underground extended the Bakerloo line with a new tube station at Queen's Park.
- Born:
  - Patrick Leigh Fermor, British author and soldier, author of A Time of Gifts; in London, England (d. 2011)
  - Richard Hamming, American mathematician, best known for this contributions to computer engineering through concepts such as the Hamming code; in Chicago, United States (d. 1998)

== February 12, 1915 (Friday) ==
- Russian Sikorsky Ilya Muromets bombers were used for the first time since their development on a bombing raid of the Vistula-Dobrzhani area of Poland.
- The British Army established the 25th Battalion of the Royal Fusiliers to serve in the African theatre.
- The Roman Catholic Diocese of Sapporo was established in Sapporo, Japan.
- American biologist Ernest Everett Just became the first recipient of the Spingarn Medal awarded by the NAACP for this scientific achievements in the field of cell biology and "foremost service to his race."
- The association football club Liverpool was formed in Montevideo, taking on the British namesake as most of the coal ships in the Uruguay port were from Liverpool.
- The American comedy-drama film Across the Way, starring Boyd Marshall, was released across the United States, then in Great Britain in July.
- Born:
  - Richard G. Colbert, American naval officer, President of the Naval War College from 1968 to 1971, and commander in chief of all NATO forces in southern Europe from 1972 to 1973; in Brownsville, Pennsylvania, United States (d. 1973)
  - Lorne Greene, Canadian actor and newscaster, best known for his lead roles in Bonanza and Battlestar Galactica, nicknamed the "Voice of Doom" during his days as a CBC Radio newscaster during World War II; as Lyon Himan Green, in Ottawa, Canada (d. 1987)
  - Olivia Hooker, American sailor and psychologist, first African-American woman to serve in the United States Coast Guard, survivor of the Tulsa race massacre; in Muskogee, Oklahoma, United States (d. 2018)
- Died:
  - Fanny Crosby, 94, American hymn writer, author of over 8,000 hymns and gospel songs and 1,000 secular poems (b. 1820)
  - Émile Waldteufel, 77, French composer, best known for his prolific compositions for polkas and waltzes (b. 1837)

== February 13, 1915 (Saturday) ==
- German torpedo boat SMS V25 struck a mine and sank in the North Sea with the loss of 79 of her crew.
- The Nishio Railway extended the Nishio Line in the Aichi Prefecture, Japan, with station Fukuchi serving the line.
- Born: Aung San, Burmese national leader, 5th Premier of British Crown Colony of Burma from 1946 to 1947; as Htein Lin, in Natmauk, British Burma (present-day Myanmar) (assassinated, 1947)

== February 14, 1915 (Sunday) ==
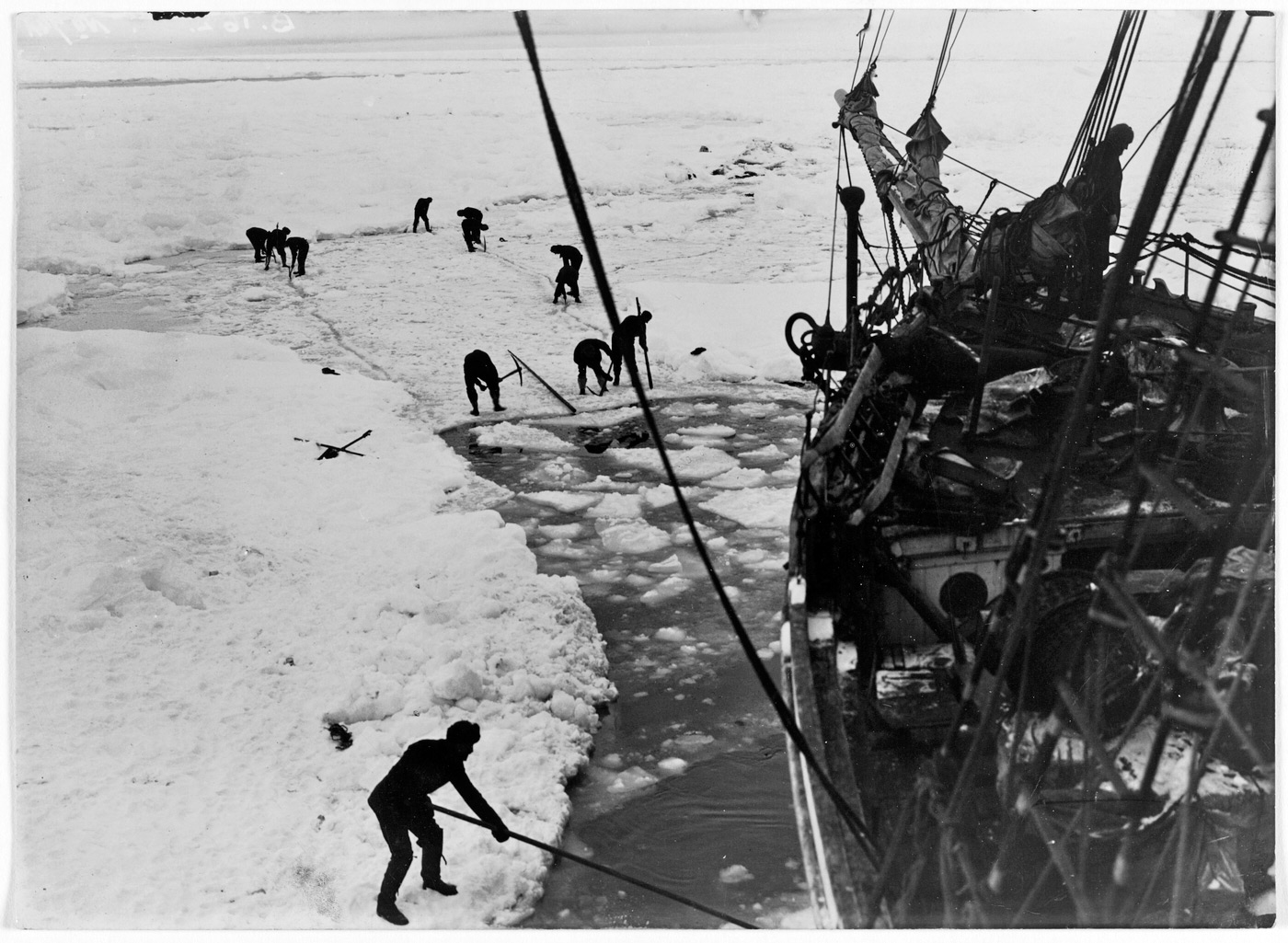
Crew members working to free the Endurance from the ice.

- The 1st Canadian Division arrived in France.
- The first contingent of 500 Māori soldiers sailed for Egypt aboard SS Wairrimoo, reversing an earlier decision not to have New Zealand's indigenous population participate in the war effort.
- After weeks moored in thick ice, the crew of the Imperial Trans-Antarctic Expedition attempted to free their ship Endurance by hacking through the ice pack with ice-chisels, prickers, saws and picks. When the effort proved futile, expedition leader Ernest Shackleton wrote he now expected the "possibility of having to spend a winter in the inhospitable arms of the pack."
- The first Inter-Allied Socialist Conference was held in London, with 40 delegates from five countries attending. Three more conferences would be held before the end of World War I.
- The Imperial German Army established the 9th Landwehr Division.
- No. 11 Squadron and No. 12 Squadron of the Royal Flying Corps were established at Netheravon, England.
- The Thorndale station open on the Red Line in Chicago.
- An annular solar eclipse was observed in western Australia and Papua New Guinea.
- Born:
  - J. Paul Austin, American business executive, president and CEO of The Coca-Cola Company from 1962 to 1981; as John Paul Austin, in LaGrange, Georgia, United States (d. 1985)
  - Thomas L. Ridge, American marine corps officer, commander of the 3rd Battalion, 1st Marines during the Korean War, recipient of the Silver Star, Legion of Merit, Air Medal, Bronze Star Medal; in Chicago, United States (d. 1999)

== February 15, 1915 (Monday) ==
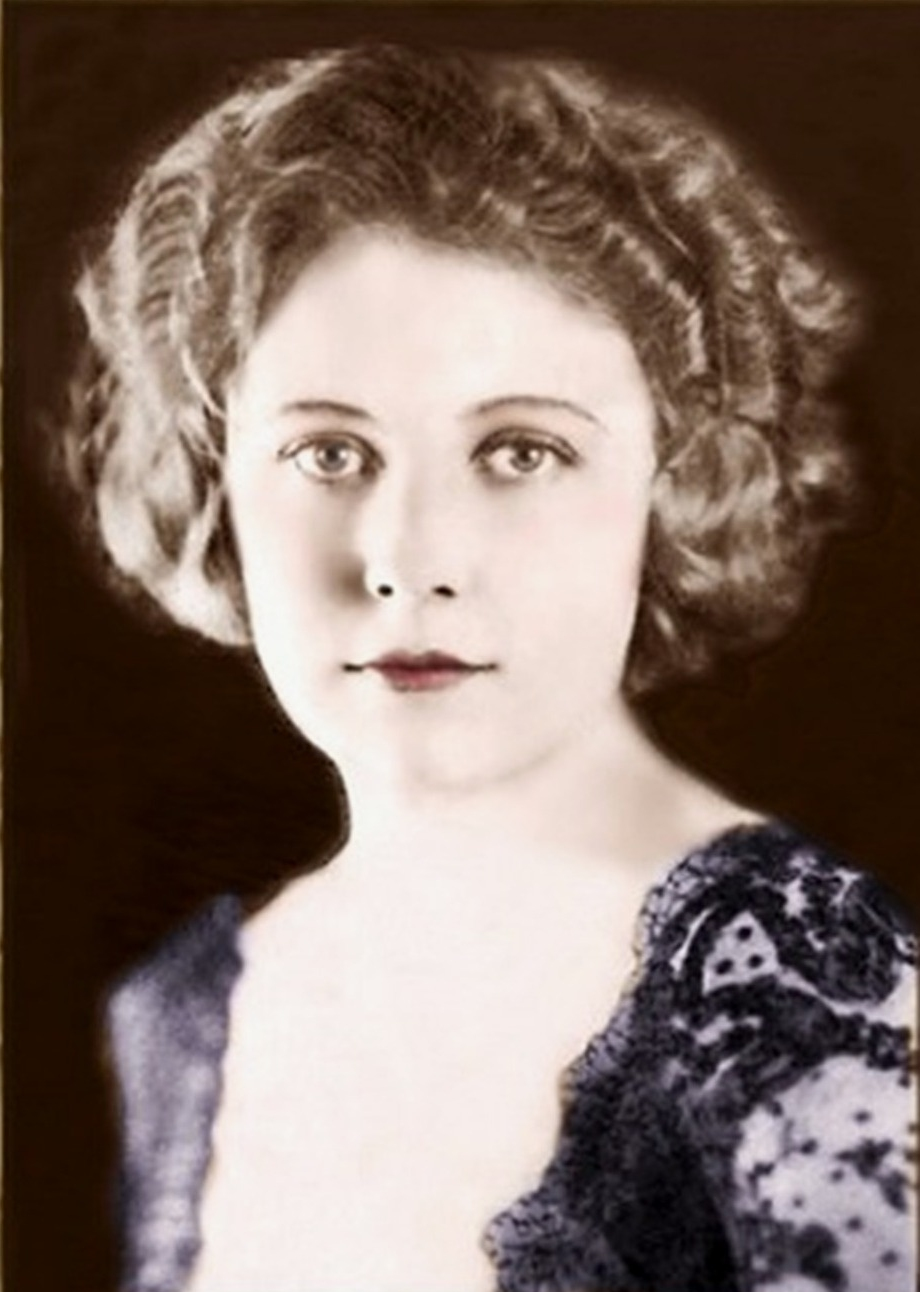
Edna Purviance

- Singapore Mutiny —Nearly half of the Indian soldiers with the 5th Light Infantry stationed in Singapore rose up in mutiny, which lasted nearly a full week causing 47 deaths before it was quelled. The incident was linked with the larger Ghadar Mutiny, an attempt to end the British Raj in India.
- Edna Purviance made her film debut with Charlie Chaplin in A Night Out, the first film Chaplin released through Essanay Studios. Shortly after, Purviance and Chaplin became romantically involved, and she became his leading lady for his next 30 films, including the 1921 classic The Kid.
- The Hippodrome Theatre in Terre Haute, Indiana officially opened. Because of its unique design by theatre architect John Eberson, the building was placed on the National Register of Historic Places in 1983.
- The association football club Livorno Calcio was established in Livorno, Italy.
- Died: Hafiz Hakki Pasha, 36, Ottoman army officer, one of the commanding officers of the Ottoman Empire at the Battle of Sarikamish; died from typhus (b. 1878)

== February 16, 1915 (Tuesday) ==
- The Swedish cargo ship Mary departed from Seaham harbour in Britain with 18 crew, bound for Malmö in Sweden, but never arrived, and no trace of the ship nor the crew was found. In that there were no storms or attacks on shipping noted along the route during the time of the ship's sailing, an investigative board reported that the cause was undetermined but that sinking by a naval mine could not be rule out.
- Born: Bobby Bauer, Canadian hockey player, right wing for the Boston Bruins from 1935 to 1952; as Robert Bauer, in Waterloo, Ontario, Canada (d. 1964)

== February 17, 1915 (Wednesday) ==
- Singapore mutiny — French, Japanese and Russian sailors and marines landed in Singapore to help British soldiers and local police capture mutinous soldiers with the Indian Army.
- HMS Ark Royal, the first seaplane carrier of the Royal Navy, flew air reconnaissance over the Dardanelles near Turkey, as a prelude to British naval action against the Ottoman Empire.
- The pair of Zeppelin airships that bombed England were wrecked in Denmark while searching for British ships off Norway.
- The Łódź Philharmonic symphony orchestra was established in Łódź, Poland, then part of the Russian Empire.
- Born: Pavla Jerina Lah, Slovene surgeon and partisan (d. 2007)
- Died: George Franklin Barber, 60, American architect, best known for his residential "Barber" houses including the Isaac Ziegler House in Knoxville, Tennessee and the John Calvin Owings House in Laurens, South Carolina, all documented by the Historic American Buildings Survey (b. 1854)

== February 18, 1915 (Thursday) ==
- Second Battle of the Masurian Lakes — Russian troops with the 20th Army Corps were surrounded by German forces in Augustów Primeval Forest in western Poland but used their last stand to buy time for the retreating Russian 10th Army to reform their defenses.
- Singapore mutiny — Allied forces captured 432 mutineers from the 5th Light Infantry. Reinforcements from Rangoon relieved Allied naval forces and captured the remaining mutineers three days later.
- German battleship SMS Bayern was launched at the Howaldtswerke-Deutsche Werft shipyard in Kiel, Germany. It was one of the ships scuttled in Scapa Flow.
- The V Corps of the British Army was established under command of Sir Herbert Plumer. The corps engaged in most of the major battles on the Western Front including Ypres, Somme and Ancre.
- Born: Joe Gordon, American baseball player, second baseman for the New York Yankees and Cleveland Indians from 1938 to 1950, five-time World Series champion; as Joseph Gordon, in Los Angeles, United States (d. 1978)
- Died:
  - Frank James, 72, American outlaw, older brother of outlaw Jesse James and member of the James–Younger Gang (b. 1843)
  - Stojan Novaković, 72, Serbian state leader, 38th Prime Minister of Serbia (b. 1842)

== February 19, 1915 (Friday) ==
- Naval operations in the Dardanelles campaign in the eastern Mediterranean Sea commenced with two Royal Navy destroyers sent to test the straits leading to Constantinople. When fired upon by seaside forts, British battleships HMS Cornwallis and Vengeance moved in to engage.
- Died: Gopal Krishna Gokhale, 48, Indian activist, one of the key leaders of the Indian independence movement, senior leader of the Indian National Congress and founder of the Servants of India Society (b. 1866)

== February 20, 1915 (Saturday) ==
- The Panama–Pacific International Exposition opened in San Francisco.
- The Imperial German Army established the 6th Bavarian Landwehr Division.
- Born:
  - Thomas J. McIntyre, American politician, U.S. Senator for New Hampshire from 1962 to 1979; in Laconia, New Hampshire, United States (d. 1992)
  - Reginald Kierath, Australian air force officer, member of the No. 450 Squadron and escape team from German POW camp Stalag Luft III during World War II; in Narromine, Australia (executed, 1944)

== February 21, 1915 (Sunday) ==
- Second Battle of the Masurian Lakes — Russian troops with the 20th Army Corps holding out in Poland's Augustów Primeval Forest surrendered to German forces.
- Canadian feminist Nellie McClung presented a petition to the Alberta Legislature demanding women's suffrage.
- While still held fast in the ice, the British polar expedition ship Endurance began to drift with the ice to her most southerly latitude, 76°58′S, after which the pack began to drift in a northerly direction away from the Antarctic.
- The IX Brigade of the Royal Horse Artillery disbanded and its members became part of the 6th Indian Cavalry Brigade for the Mesopotamian campaign.
- Born:
  - Godfrey Brown, British runner, gold and silver medalist at the 1936 Summer Olympics; as Arthur Godfrey Kilner Brown, in Bankura, British India (present-day India) (d. 1995)
  - Les Long, British air force officer, member of the No. 9 Squadron and the escape team from the German POW camp Stalag Luft III during World War II; as James Leslie Robert Long, in Bournemouth, England (executed, 1944)
  - Claudia Jones, Trinidadian-British journalist, founder of the West Indian Gazette; as Claudia Vera Cumberbatch, in Port of Spain, Trinidad and Tobago (d. 1964)
  - André Laguerre, British-American sports journalist, managing editor for Sports Illustrated from 1960 to 1974, creator of the Sports Illustrated Swimsuit Issue; as Marc André Laguerre, in Ottery St Mary, England (d. 1979)
  - Ann Sheridan, American film actress, known for film roles such as Angels with Dirty Faces and The Man Who Came to Dinner; as Clara Lou Sheridan, in Denton, Texas, United States (d. 1967)

== February 22, 1915 (Monday) ==
- Second Battle of the Masurian Lakes — Soldiers with the Russian 12th Army counterattacked advancing German forces and checked their advance, forcing the battle to end. Russian casualties were heavy, with an estimated 200,000 casualties. Estimates of Russian soldiers captured during the week-long retreat varied, with some citing 92,000 Russian prisoners and 300 captured guns while others cited 56,000 prisoners and 185 captured guns. Germans losses were light, with 16,200 casualties.
- The High Court of Australia upheld the appeal from the New South Wales state government in its action to acquire wheat to control commodity prices that were rising due to ongoing droughts and World War I, agreeing that these actions did not contravene the freedom of interstate trade within Australia.
- The Great Central Railway closed Plank Lane railway station in Leigh, Greater Manchester, England.
- The Federación Novena de Football Clubes was founded as management organization for association football clubs in Andalusia, Spain. The name was changed to its present title Andalusia Football Federation in 1950.
- The Allan Dwan directed film David Harum was released. The film was the first in long line of a successful romantic onscreen pairings of actors May Allison and Harold Lockwood, who appeared together in about 25 films until 1918 when Lockwood died from Spanish flu during a pandemic.
- Died: John Gough, 43, British army officer, commander of Kitchener's Army, recipient of the Victoria Cross, Order of the Bath, and Order of St Michael and St George; killed by German soldier in Fauquissart, France (b. 1871)

== February 23, 1915 (Tuesday) ==
- Joseph Davilmar Théodore was forced to resign as President of Haiti following a counter-revolution in the country. He had been in office only four months following the toppling of president Oreste Zamor in October 1914.
- Singapore mutiny — A court on inquiry was held to investigate the causes of the mutiny and would last until May 15.
- The U.S. Supreme Court ruled that free speech protection did not extend to motion pictures, allowing Ohio to uphold its film censorship board. The decision paved the way to the forming a federal Motion Picture Production Code in 1934.
- The Hungarian operetta Miss Springtime by Emmerich Kálmán premiered at Vig theatre in Budapest, and would premier a year later on Broadway.
- Born:
  - Paul Tibbets, American Air Force officer, pilot of the Enola Gay; in Quincy, Illinois, United States (d. 2007)
  - Jon Hall, American film actor, best known for adventure roles for Universal Pictures such as The Hurricane and Kit Carson; as Charles Felix Locher, in Fresno, California, United States (d. 1979)
- Died: Robert Smalls, 75, American naval officer and politician, first African American to be a naval officer, commander of the USS Planter during the American Civil War, member of the South Carolina Senate from 1870 to 1875, U.S. Representative of South Carolina from 1882 to 1887; died from malaria and diabetes (b. 1839)

== February 24, 1915 (Wednesday) ==
- French destroyer Dague struck a mine and sank at Bar, Montenegro with the loss of 38 of her crew.
- With the polar expedition ship Endurance now likely trapped in the ice pack for the entire Antarctic winter, Ernest Shackleton ordered the crew to build ice-kennels for the expedition dogs off-board and convert the ship's interior to winter quarters.
- The Royal Australian Naval Bridging Train of the Royal Australian Navy was established.
- Born: Carlos Prats, Chilean army officer and politician, Commander-in-chief of the Chilean Army during the 1973 coup; as Carlos Prats González, in Talcahuano, Chile (d. 1974, assassinated)
- Died: Amanda Smith, 78, American activist, former slave whose autobiography, The Story of the Lord's Dealing with Mrs. Amanda Smith, the Colored Evangelist Containing an Account of her Life Work of Faith, and Her Travels in America, England, Ireland, Scotland, India, and Africa, as An Independent Missionary, became a best-seller (b. 1837)

== February 25, 1915 (Thursday) ==
- Royal Navy battleships HMS Cornwallis, Albion and Vengeance bombarded sea forts held by the Ottoman Empire in the Dardanelles straits.
- Vilbrun Guillaume Sam became President of Haiti.
- Ottoman War Minister Enver Pasha issued a directive ordering all ethnic Armenians serving in the armed forces of the Ottoman Empire to be removed from their posts assigned to labour battalions on the fear they would "collaborate with the Russians."
- Bluff War — Members of the Paiute and Ute tribes in Utah exchanged gunfire with a 50-man posse in what was referred to as the Battle of Cottonwood Gulch. The posse had been organized in Bluff, Utah to bring in the son of a Paiute chief alleged in causing the death of a shepherd the year before. The firefight ended in a truce after several hours, but resulted in at least one death and several wounded among the posse. It was one of the last major armed conflicts between the United States and Native Americans.
- The first edition of the Stuyvesant High School newspaper The Spectator was published in New York City.
- Born:
  - S. Rajaratnam, Ceylonese-Singaporean politician, cabinet minister for the Lee Kuan Yew administration; as Sinnathamby Rajaratnam, in Jaffna, British Ceylon (present-day Sri Lanka) (d. 2006)
  - Stig Synnergren, Swedish army officer, Supreme Commander of the Swedish Armed Forces from 1970 to 1978; in Boden, Sweden (d. 2004)

== February 26, 1915 (Friday) ==
- A second German attempt to bomb England using airships failed when strong headwinds forced the Zeppelins to land at an Imperial German Army camp in German-occupied Belgium.
- Born: Luther Christman, American public servant, founder of the American Assembly for Men in Nursing; in Summit Hill, Pennsylvania, United States (d. 2011)
- Died: Charles Heywood, 75, American marine officer, 9th Commandant of the Marine Corps; died from chronic heart disease (b. 1839)

== February 27, 1915 (Saturday) ==
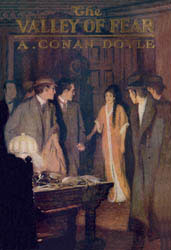
Cover of first U.S. edition of The Valley of Fear.

- Battle of Hartmannswillerkopf — French forces shelled then attacked German defenses on the Hartmannswillerkopf summit on the French-German border but were pushed back.
- British racing driver Dario Resta won the 6th running of the American Grand Prize in San Francisco driving a Peugeot EX3 in over 644.22 km (6.195 km x 104 laps) in 7:07:53.
- Sir Arthur Conan Doyle released the fourth and final Sherlock Holmes novel The Valley of Fear in book form by the George H. Doran Company in New York City. The story was first published in The Strand Magazine between September 1914 and May 1915.
- Died: Albert Decrais, 76, French politician, 9th Minister of the Colonies (b. 1838)

== February 28, 1915 (Sunday) ==
- Canadian troops launched the first trench raid of World War I. By the end of the conflict Canadian troops were regarded as experts at this manoeuvre.
- British poet Rupert Brooke sailed with the British Mediterranean Expeditionary Force. During the campaign he developed sepsis from an infected mosquito bite, which ended with his death in a hospital ship off Skyros. His collection 1914 & Other Poems, including the sonnet "The Soldier", was published posthumously in May.
- Born:
  - Peter Medawar, British scientist, recipient of the Nobel Prize in Physiology or Medicine for his research and innovation in organ transplantation; in Petrópolis, Brazil (d. 1987)
  - Zero Mostel, American film and stage actor, best known for playing Tevye in the Broadway production of Fiddler on the Roof and the lead role in Mel Brooks' The Producers; as Samuel Joel Mostel, in New York City, United States (d. 1977)
