= Stoke Doran =

Canadian ice hockey player

- Born: August 12, 1884; Morrisburg, Ontario, Canada
- Died: July 13, 1927 (aged 42); Boston, Massachusetts, U.S.
- Position: Defence
- Played for: Cobalt Silver Kings
- Playing career: 1902–1915

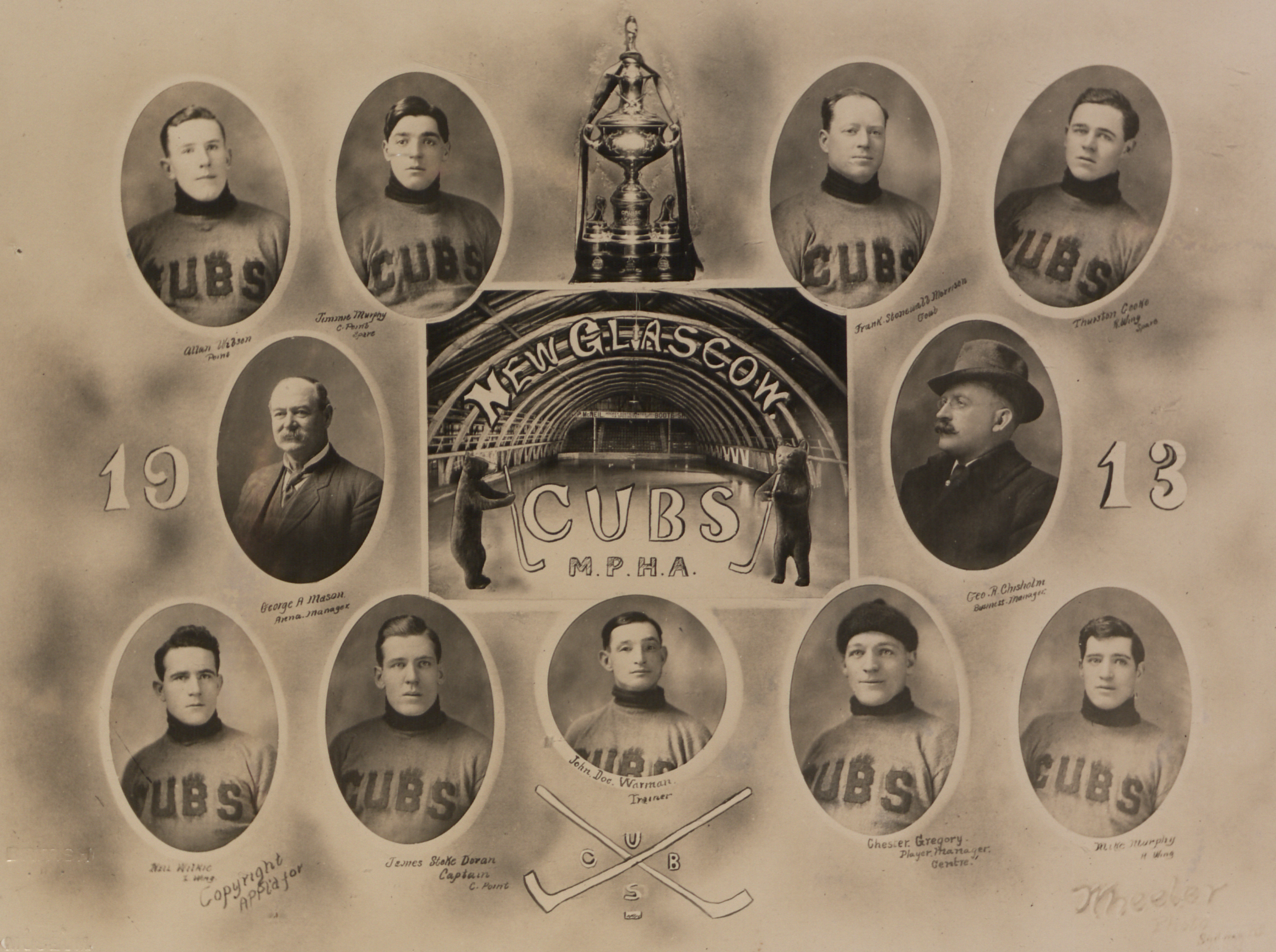
Doran, second from left bottom row, with the New Glasgow Cubs in 1912–13.

James Walter "Stoke" Doran (August 12, 1884 – July 13, 1927) was a Canadian professional ice hockey player from Morrisburg, Ontario. He played with the Cobalt Silver Kings of the National Hockey Association, during the league's inaugural season in 1910.

Doran, a defenceman, also played with the Toronto Pros in the OPHL and with the New Glasgow Cubs in the MaPHL.
