= Allan Wilson (ice hockey) =

Canadian ice hockey player

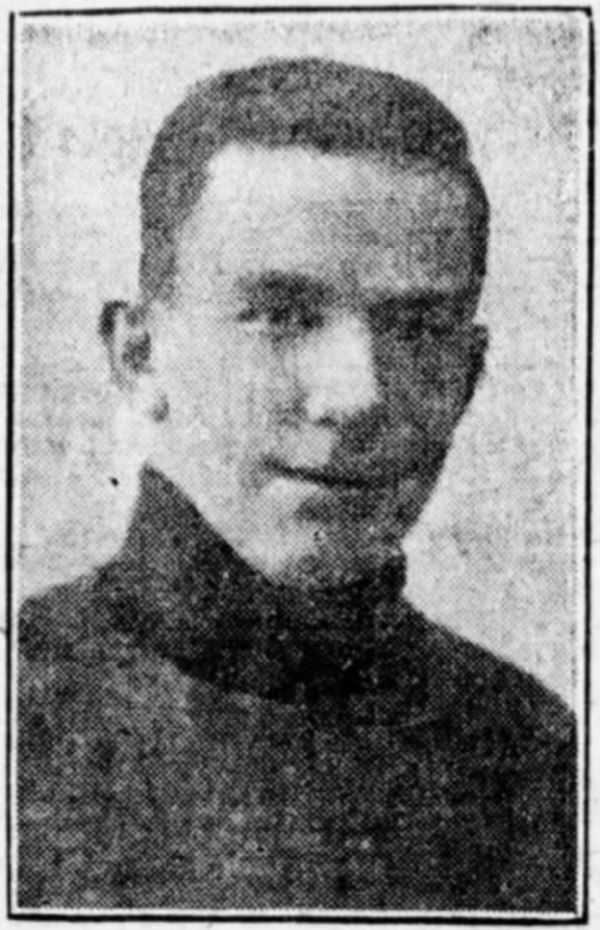
- Born: August 20, 1894 Pembroke, Ontario, Canada
- Died: December 3, 1940 (aged 46) New York, New York, USA
- Height: 5 ft 10 in (178 cm)
- Weight: 170 lb (77 kg; 12 st 2 lb)
- Position: Defence
- Played for: New Glasgow Cubs; Ottawa Senators
- Playing career: 1911–1914

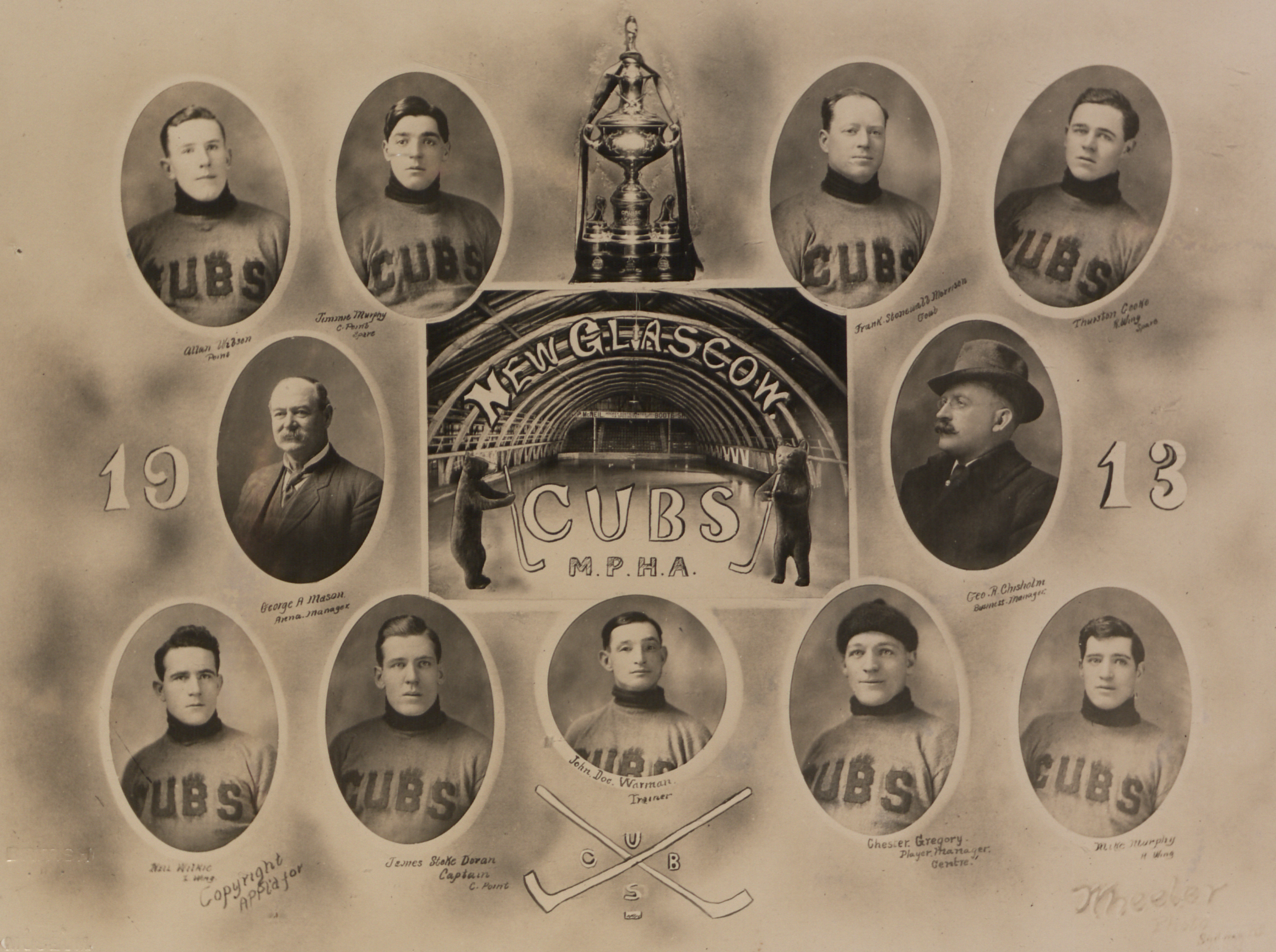
Wilson, at top left corner, with the New Glasgow Cubs in 1912–13.

Allan Robert Wilson (August 20, 1894 – December 3, 1940) was a Canadian professional ice hockey player. He played with the Ottawa Senators of the National Hockey Association during the 1913–14 season.

Wilson, a defenceman, was also a member of the New Glasgow Cubs of the Maritime Professional Hockey League in 1912–13.
