= J.V. Banta House =

Historic house in Iowa, United States

- U.S. National Register of Historic Places
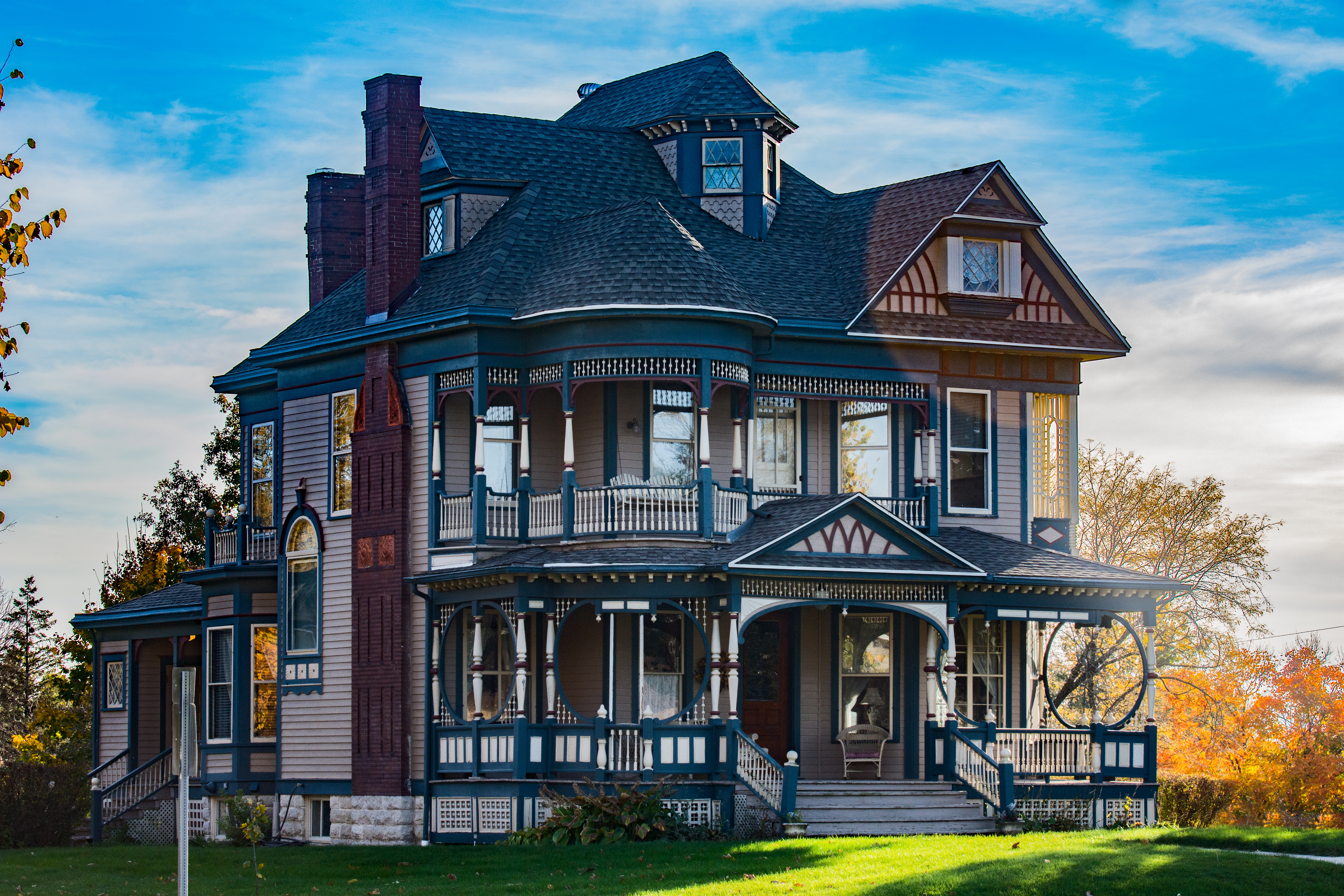

- Location within Iowa Location within the United States
- Location: 222 McLane St., Osceola, Iowa
- Coordinates: 41°01′49″N 93°46′08″W
- Area: less than one acre
- Built: 1902
- Built by: Dan Webster; Jap Smith
- Architect: George F. Barber and Company
- Architectural style: Queen Anne
- NRHP reference No.: 83000348
- Added to NRHP: July 14, 1983

The J.V. Banta House is a historic house located at 222 McLane Street in Osceola, Iowa.

== Description and history ==
J.V. Banta and his wife Lillie moved from Vinton, Iowa to Osceola in 1868. He was an attorney, banker and land speculator who founded the J. V. Banta Abstract and Loan Company. The couple were known for their philanthropy in the local community.

Their Queen Anne house was designed by the Knoxville, Tennessee mail order architectural practice George F. Barber and Company. It appears to be Design No. 10 from the company's 1899 catalog Modern Dwellings and Their Proper Construction. While this design is found in other states it is the only one known to exist in Iowa. Two local master builders, Dan Webster and Jap Smith, completed the house in 1902. The 2½-story frame structure is built on a limestone foundation. It follows an irregular plan and is capped with a hipped roof.

Stylistic features include a Syrian arch that is reminiscent of the Richardsonian Romanesque style, and a round arched and bay window on the east side of the house that reflects the Colonial Revival style.

The house remained in the Banta family until 1983, the year it was listed on the National Register of Historic Places.
