= New Glasgow Cubs =

- City: New Glasgow, Nova Scotia; Canada
- League: IPHL, 1910–11; MaPHL, 1911–1914; EPHL, 1914–15
- Captain: Stoke Doran (1912–13)

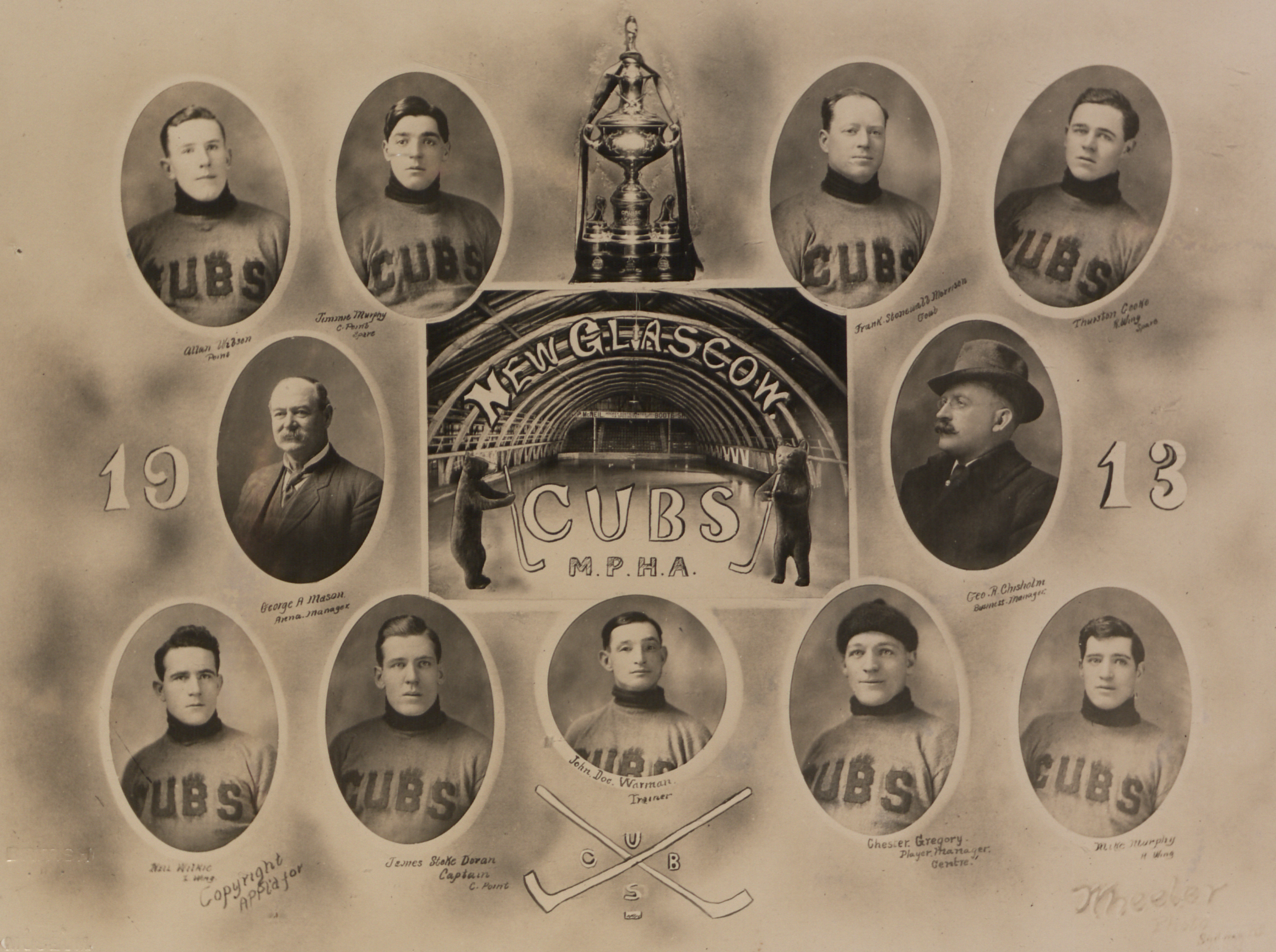
New Glasgow Cubs in 1912–13.

The New Glasgow Cubs, later the New Glasgow Black Foxes, were a professional ice hockey team from New Glasgow, Nova Scotia in Canada. The team played for three seasons in the Maritime Professional Hockey League (MaPHL), between 1911 and 1914.

In December 1906, as an amateur team, the Cubs challenged the Montreal Wanderers of the ECAHA for the Stanley Cup, losing 3–10 and 2–7 over two games at the Montreal Arena. It was the first Stanley Cup challenge series were professional players were allowed to participate, and the Wanderers played with both pros and amateurs while the Cubs were strictly amateur.

== Notable players ==
- Jack Marks
- Reddy McMillan
- Stoke Doran
- Allan Wilson
