= Eastern Professional Hockey League =

Eastern Professional Hockey League may refer to several North American professional ice hockey leagues:

- Eastern Professional Hockey League (1914–15), Canada-U.S.; successor to the Maritime Professional Hockey League
- Eastern Professional Hockey League (1959–1963), Canada
- Eastern Professional Hockey League (2008–09), U.S.
