= Moncton Victorias =

- City: Moncton, New Brunswick; Canada
- League: Maritime Professional Hockey League, 1911–1913
- Colours: Red, White

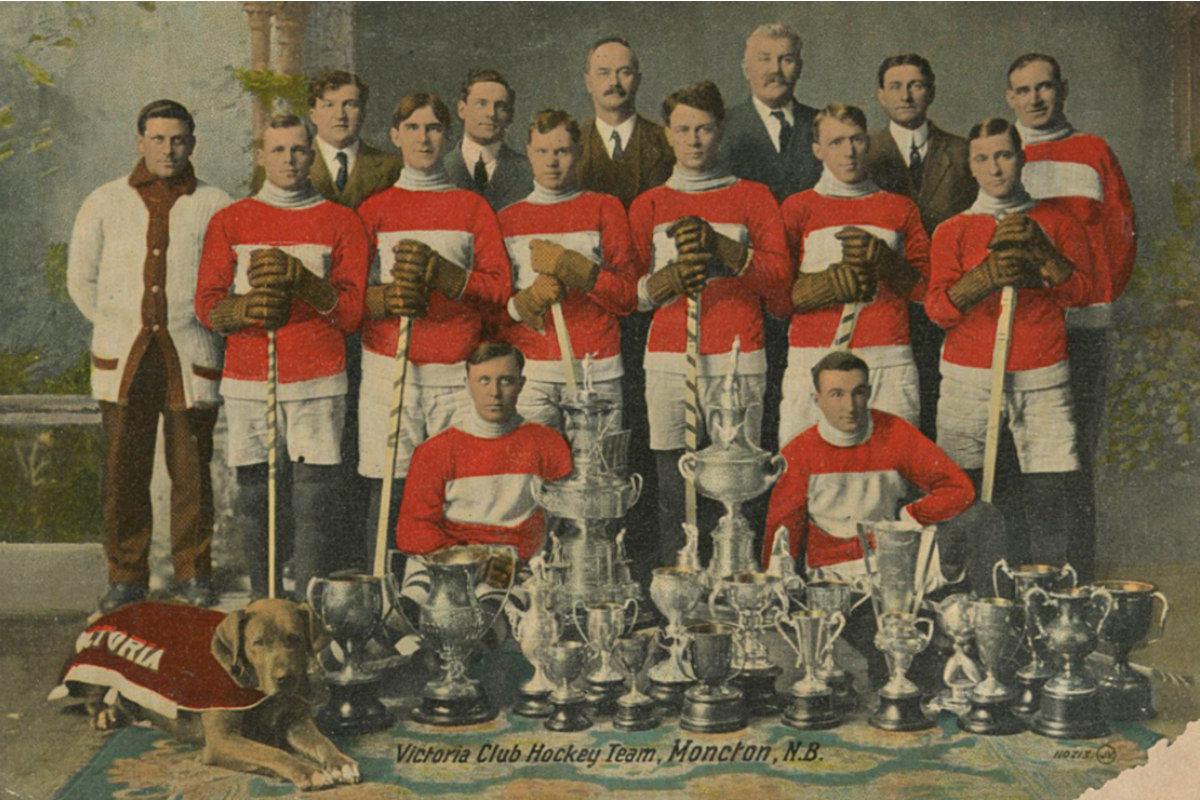
Moncton Victorias in 1912–13.

The Moncton Victorias were a professional ice hockey team from Moncton, New Brunswick in Canada. The team played for two seasons in the Maritime Professional Hockey League (MPHL), in 1911–12 and 1912–13.

== Biography ==
Moncton Victorias won the 1911–12 installation of the Maritime Professional Hockey League which gave the club an opportunity to challenge Stanley Cup holders the Quebec Bulldogs of the National Hockey Association for the coveted trophy. Quebec Bulldogs won the challenge 9-3 and 8-0 on March 11 and 13, 1912.

Priorly to the 1911–12 season Moncton Victorias had figured in the New Brunswick Senior Hockey League (1904–1908) and in the Interprovincial Professional Hockey League (1910–11).

== Notable players ==
Two Hockey Hall of Fame inductees played for Moncton Victorias – Tommy Smith and Jack Walker.
