= Isaac Ziegler House =

Former house in Knoxville, Tennessee

- Formerly listed on the U.S. National Register of Historic Places
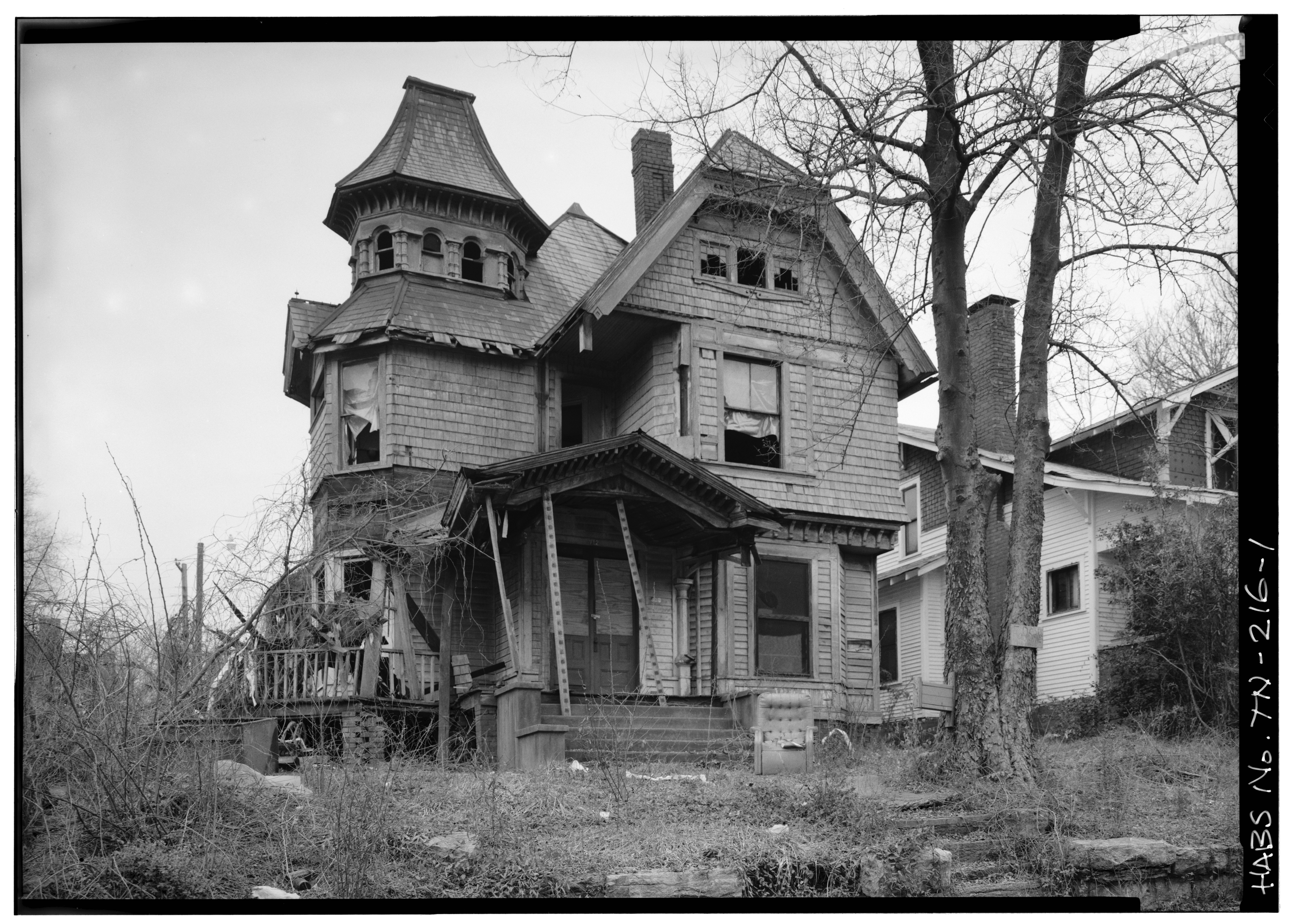
- Ziegler House, HABS photograph
- Location: 712 N. Fourth Avenue, Knoxville, Tennessee
- Coordinates: 35°58′43″N 83°55′4″W
- Built: 1892
- Architect: George Franklin Barber
- Architectural style: Queen Anne, Romanesque
- NRHP reference No.: 75001765

Significant dates
- Added to NRHP: May 2, 1975
- Removed from NRHP: August 1, 1986

The Isaac Ziegler House was a historic home once located at 712 North 4th Avenue in Knoxville, Tennessee. Designed by prominent Knoxville catalog architect George Franklin Barber, it was listed on the National Register of Historic Places and was described as the most ornate Queen Anne-Romanesque house in Tennessee.

== History ==
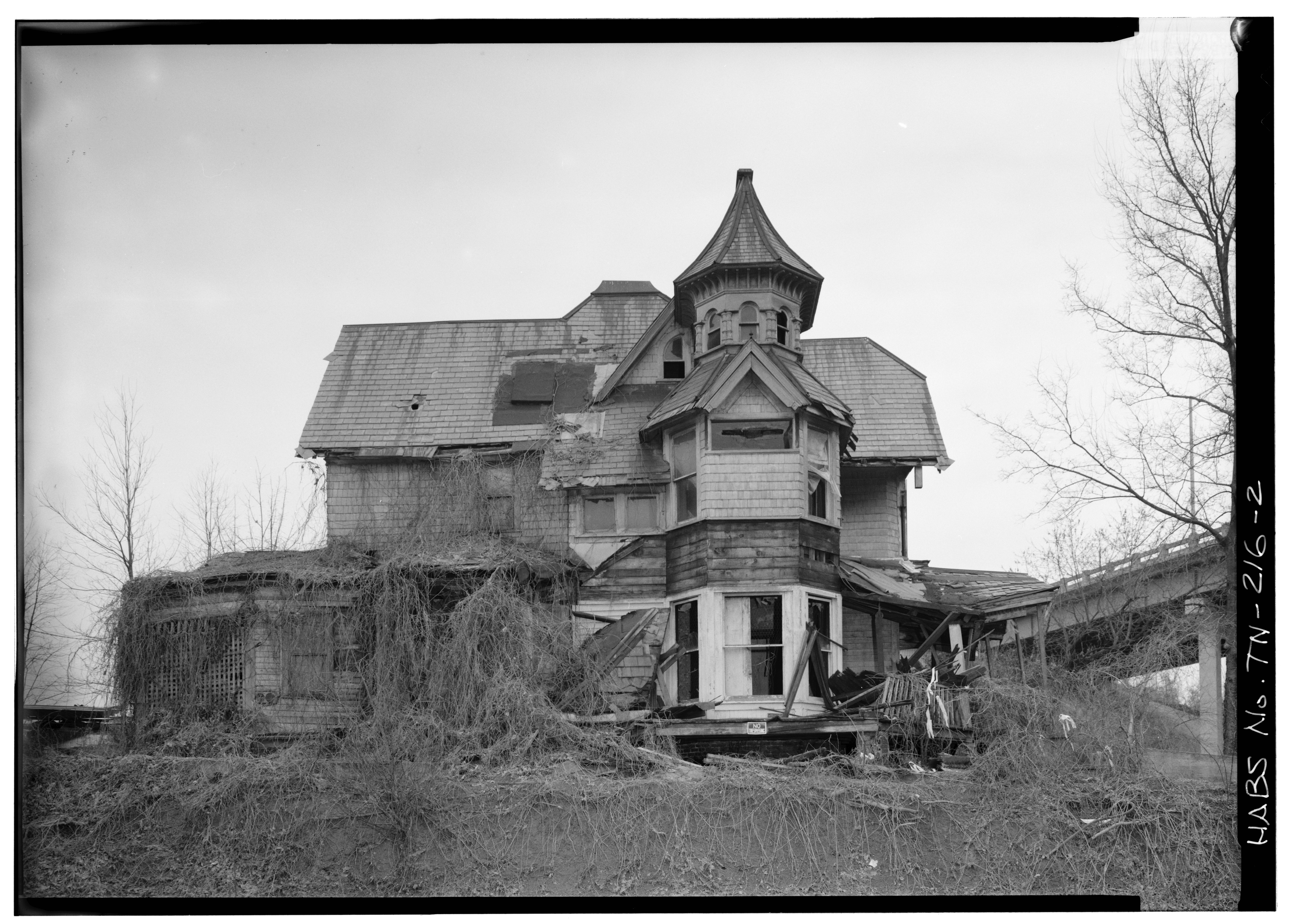
Side elevation of house with porch removed. 1983

The house was built in 1892. Demographic changes in Knoxville's inner city neighborhoods and the construction of the Magnolia Expressway across the street from the house contributed to the neglect and deterioration of the once impressive house. It was finally demolished by the city.

== See also ==
- List of George Franklin Barber works

== Sources ==
- Knoxville: Fifty Landmarks. (Knoxville: The Knoxville Heritage Committee of the Junior League of Knoxville, 1976).
- Barber, George F. Victorian Cottage Architecture: An American Catalog of Designs, 1891. (Dover, 2004)
- Barber, George F. The Cottage Souvenir: Containing over two hundred original designs and plans of artistic dwellings. (S.B. Newman & Co; Rev. edition, 1892).
- Barber, George F. The Cottage Souvenir No. 2: Containing one hundred and twenty original designs in cottage and detail architecture. (S.B. Newman & Co., 1891).
- Barber, George F. Art in Architecture,: With the modern architectural designer for those who wish to build or beautify their homes. (S.B. Newman; 2d ed edition, 1902).
