= Tenri Station =

Railway station in Tenri, Nara Prefecture, Japan

Tenri Station 天理駅
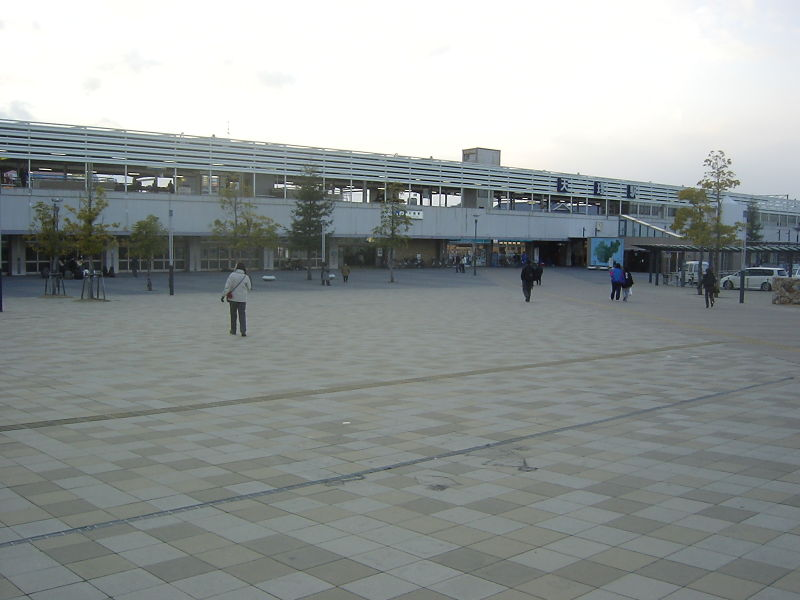

General information
- Location: JR-West: 816, Kawaharajōchō, Tenri; Kintetsu Railway: 815, Kawaharajōchō, Tenri; Nara: Japan; JR-West: （奈良県天理市川原城町816番地）; Kintetsu Railway: （奈良県天理市川原城町815番地）
- Coordinates: 34°36′04″N 135°49′48″E
- System: commuter rail station
- Owner: West Japan Railway Company (JR-West); Kintetsu Railway
- Operator: West Japan Railway Company (JR-West); Kintetsu Railway
- Lines: Passenger train services: U Man-yō Mahoroba Line; H Tenri Line; Railway track: Sakurai Line; Tenri Line
- Distance: JR-West: 9.6 km (6.0 miles) from Nara; Kintetsu Railway: 4.5 km (2.8 miles) from Hirahata
- Platforms: JR-West: 2 island platforms; Kintetsu Railway: 2 island platforms and 2 side platforms (3 bay platforms)
- Tracks: JR-West: 4; Kintetsu Railway: 3
- Train operators: JR-West; Kintetsu Railway
- Bus stands: 3
- Connections: Kanto Bus / Nara Kotsu Bus Lines: Yamato-gō Shinjuku—Nara Route and Shinjuku—Gojō Route at Tenri-eki; Keisei Bus / Nara Kotsu Bus Lines: Yamato-gō Tokyo Disney Resort / Yokohama—Nara Route at Tenri-eki; Meitetsu Bus / Nara Kotsu Bus Lines: Nagoya—Nara Route (Get-off only) at Tenri-eki; Nara Kotsu Bus Lines / Osaka Airport Transport: Airport Limousine Nara—Osaka (Itami) Airport Route at Tenri-eki; Nara Kotsu Bus Lines: 18, 19, 20, 21, 28, 29, 38, 39, 44, 50, 52, 60, 62, 63, 65, 66, 82, 92, 192, and Bun (School) at Tenri-eki; Tenri City Community Bus: Ichō-gō at Tenri-eki

Construction
- Structure type: JR-West: Elevated; Kintetsu Railway: At grade
- Parking: Available
- Cycle facilities: Available
- Accessible: JR-West: Yes (1 elevator for each platform and 1 accessible bathroom); Kintetsu Railway: Yes (1 accessible bathroom and equipped wheelchairs)

Other information
- Station code: H35
- Website: www.jr-odekake.net/eki/top.php?id=0621704 (in Japanese) www.kintetsu.co.jp/station/station_info/en_station10008.html

History
- Opened: JR-West: 11 May 1898; Kintetsu Railway: 7 February 1915
- Rebuilt: 1965
- Electrified: JR-West: 1980; Kintetsu Railway: 1922
- Former names: JR-West: Tenrishi (1963—1965); JR-West: Tambaichi (1898—1963)

Passengers
- 2013 / 2015: JR-West: 2,753 daily; Kintetsu Railway: 10,274 daily
Services
Preceding station	JR West	Following station
Ichinomoto towards Takada	Man-yō Mahoroba Line (Sakurai Line)	Nagara towards Nara
Preceding station	Kintetsu Railway	Following station
H Tenri Line
Senzai towards Kyōto, Shin-Tanabe, Yamato-Saidaiji or Hirahata	Local	Terminus
Senzai towards Kyōto or Yamato-Saidaiji	Express	Terminus
Location
- Location within Nara Prefecture Location within Japan

Tenri Station (天理駅, Tenri-eki) is a junction passenger railway station located in the city of Tenri, Nara, Japan. It is operated by West Japan Railway Company (JR West) and by the private transportation company, Kintetsu Railway.

== Lines ==
Although the JR station is on the Sakurai Line as rail infrastructure, it has been served by the Man-yō Mahoroba Line since 2010 in terms of passenger train services. It is 14.3 kilometers from the starting point of the line at Nara. Tenri Station is also the terminus of the 4.5 Tenri Line of the Kintetsu Railway from Hirahata.

== Layout ==
The platforms for the JR portion of the station are elevated, and are located on the second floor of the station building. The station consists of two island platforms and four tracks, but only platforms 3 and 4 are in use. Platforms 1 and 2 are used as group-only platforms, and are usually used by out-of-service trains in the early morning to remove rust from the rails, and the stairs to the platforms are closed. Ticket gates, including those for groups, are on the first floor, and the south side of the first floor under the elevated track is the JR station facilities (waiting room, ticket gates, and concourse). The Tenri Line enters the station from the west at a right angle to JR West on the first floor. The station has four terminal platforms and three tracks, and there is a siding (track number 4) on the west side of the station. Platforms 2 and 3 are usually used, but platform 1 may be used during the Tenrikyo monthly festival.

=== JR West platforms ===
1	■ Man-yō Mahoroba Line	Chartered trains only
2	■ Man-yō Mahoroba Line	Chartered trains only
3	■ Man-yō Mahoroba Line—Local	for Nara
4	■ Man-yō Mahoroba Line—Local	for Sakurai and Takada
4	■ Man-yō Mahoroba Line—Rapid Service	for JR Namba via the Yamatoji Line

=== Kintetsu Railway platforms ===
1~3	■ Tenri Line	for Hirahata Yamato-Saidaiji and Kyoto

== Connections ==
Within a couple of minutes' walking distance from the main entrance, three bus stands serves local bus routes by Nara Kotsu Bus Lines and Tenri City Community Bus, as well as the inter-city and airport bus routes by Nara Kotsu Bus Lines and its co-operators, Kanto Bus, Keisei Bus, and Osaka Airport Transport.

== History ==
The station was opened 11 May 1898 as Tanbachi Station (丹波市駅) on the Nara Railway. In 1905 the station becomes the part of the Kansai Railway, which was nationalized by the Japanese Government Railways (the predecessor of JNR) in 1907. On 7 February 1915, the Tenri Light Railway expanded its route to Tenri. The Tenri Light Railway was acquired by the Osaka Electric Railway (the predecessor of Kintetsu) in 1921.The company merged with the Sangu Express Railway on March 15, 1941, to become the Kansai Express Railway. The Kansai Express Railway merged with the Nankai Railway to form Kintetsu on June 1, 1944. The JNR Tanbaichi Station was renamed as Tenrishi Station (天理市駅) on 25 May 1963. The JNR and Kintetsu stations were merged on 1 September 1965, with the station becoming Tenri Station. With the privatization of the Japan National Railways (JNR) on 1 April 1987, the JNR station was transferred to JR West.

== Passenger statistics ==
In fiscal 2019, the JR station was used by an average of 2578 passengers daily, whereas the Kintetsu portion of the station was used by 6341 passengers daily (boarding passengers only).

== Surrounding area ==
- Tenri City Hall
- Tenrikyo Church Headquarters
- Tenri University

== See also ==
- List of railway stations in Japan
