= Halifax Crescents =

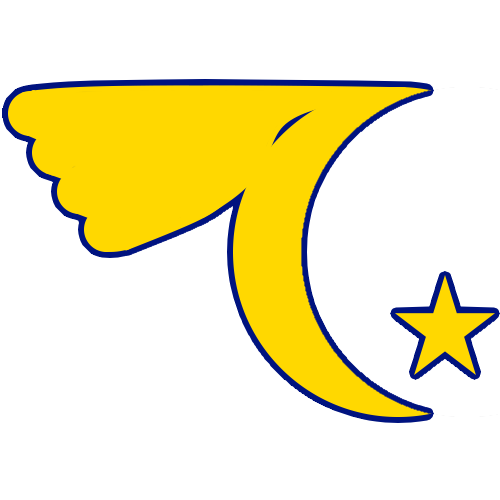
- City: Halifax; Nova Scotia; Canada
- League: MPHL
- Founded: 1899
- Operated: 1899-1910
- Home arena: Unknown
- Colours: Navy, gold

The Halifax Crescents were an early amateur and later, professional ice hockey team operating in Halifax, Nova Scotia, Canada. The team operated in several leagues, gone defunct and been resurrected. The original club challenged for the Stanley Cup in 1900. The last Crescents team in senior hockey operated in 1947–48.

== Chronology ==
The team played in the Halifax City Hockey League from 1899 until 1910. The club was one of founders of the Inter-provincial Professional League in 1910, which became the Maritime Professional Hockey League from 1911 until 1914. After the MPHL shut down, the club fielded a team again in the Halifax City League until 1925. In 1940, the Crescents name was resurrected in the HCHL league until 1946. From 1945 until 1948, a Crescents team was fielded in the Maritime Senior Hockey League.
