= Tenri Line =

Railway line in Japan

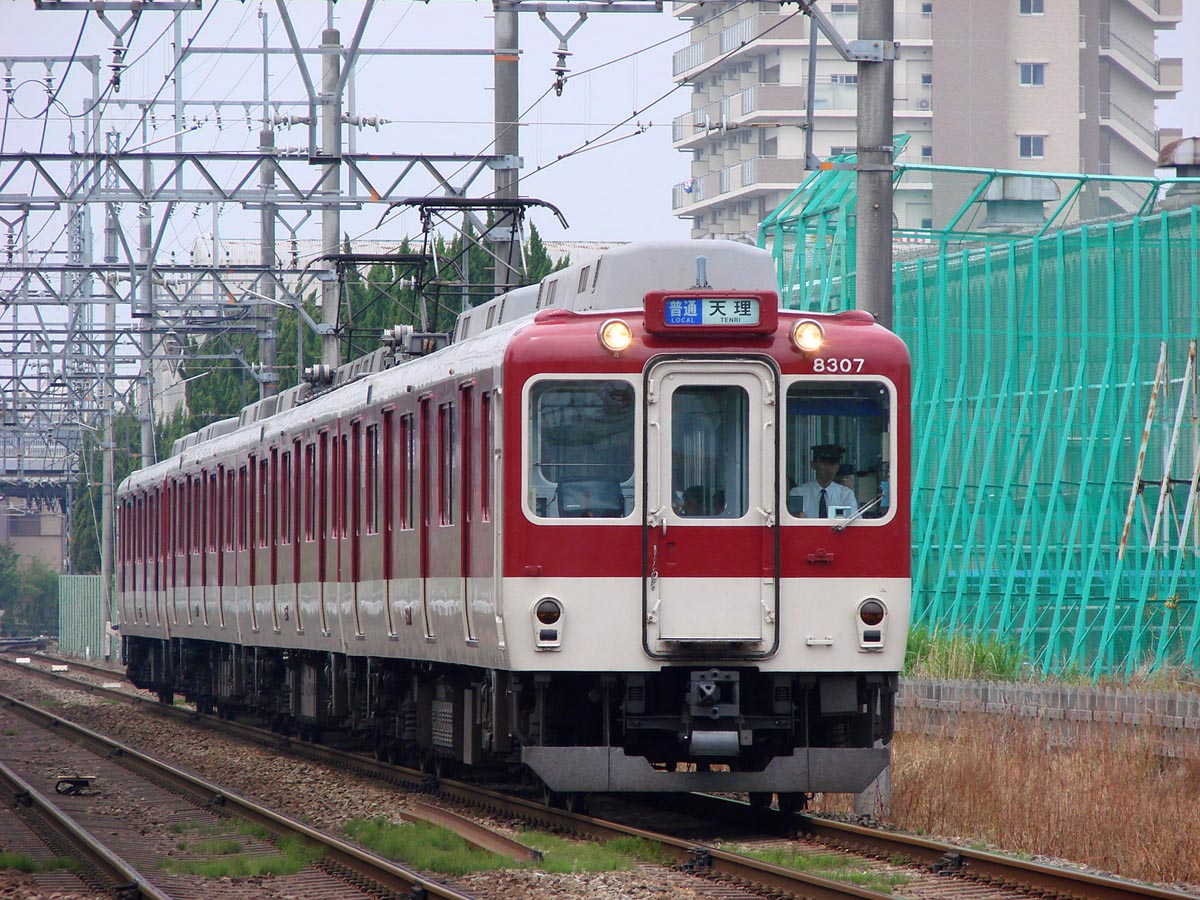
- Local train

Overview
- Native name: 天理線
- Owner: Kintetsu Railway
- Line number: H
- Locale: Nara Prefecture
- Termini: Hirahata; Tenri
- Stations: 4
- Color on map: (#E7A61A)

Service
- Type: Commuter rail
- System: Kintetsu Railway
- Operator(s): Kintetsu Railway

History
- Opened: 7 February 1915; 110 years ago

Technical
- Line length: 4.5 km (2.8 mi)
- Number of tracks: Double-track
- Track gauge: 1,435 mm (4 ft 8 1/2 in) standard gauge
- Electrification: 1,500 V DC (overhead line)
- Operating speed: 90 km/h (56 mph)
- Signalling: Automatic closed block
- Train protection system: Kintetsu ATS

The Tenri Line (天理線, Tenri sen) is a railway line of Kintetsu Railway in Nara Prefecture, Japan connecting Hirahata Station in Yamato-Kōriyama and Tenri Station in Tenri. The line has four stations including the terminal Tenri and the transfer station Hirahata. It is mainly used by commuters in the morning and evening, as well as by followers of Tenrikyo, headquartered in Tenri, especially during festivals of the religion.

== Route data ==
- Gauge: 1,435 mm (4 ft 8 1/2 in)
- Length: 4.5 km (2.8 mi)
- Interlocking system: Electronic Interlocking

== History ==
The Tenri Light Railway Co. opened a 762 mm (2 ft 6 in) gauge line from its namesake town to Horyuji on the Kansai Main Line in 1915.

The Osaka Electric Railway Co. acquired the line in 1921, the year it opened the Kashihara Line, which connected at Hirahata. The following year the line was converted to 1,435 mm (4 ft 8 1/2 in) standard gauge and electrified at 600 VDC. That company merged with Kintetsu in 1944.

The Hirahata - Horyuji section closed in 1952, and in 1969 the voltage was raised to 1500 VDC. The line was duplicated in 1988.

== Stations ==
Express trains and local trains stop at every station on the Tenri Line.

No.	Station	Japanese	Distance (km)	Connections	Location	
Through services are available to Kyoto via the B Kashihara Line and the B Kyoto Line.
H32	Hirahata	平端	0.0	B Kashihara Line (B32)	Yamatokoriyama	Nara Prefecture
H33	Nikaido	二階堂	1.3		Tenri	Nara Prefecture
H34	Senzai	前栽	3.2		Tenri	Nara Prefecture
H35	Tenri	天理	4.5	U Man-yō Mahoroba Line (Sakurai Line)	Tenri	Nara Prefecture
