= Senzai Station =

Railway station in Tenri, Nara Prefecture, Japan

Senzai Station 前栽駅
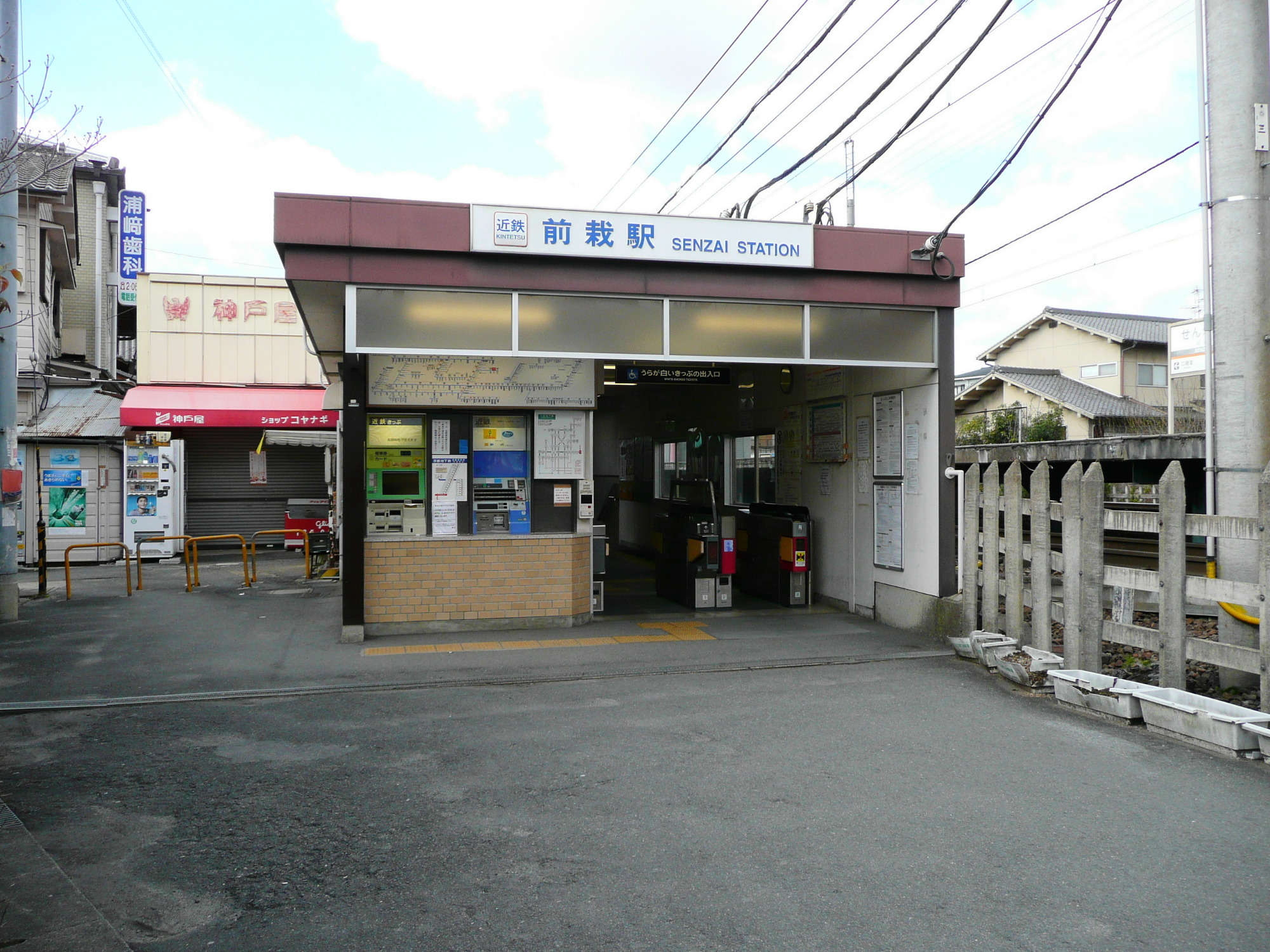

General information
- Location: 290-6, Sugimotochō, Tenri-shi, Nara-ken 632-0078; Japan
- Coordinates: 34°36′04″N 135°48′58″E
- System: Kintetsu Railway commuter rail station
- Owner: Kintetsu Railway
- Operator: Kintetsu Railway
- Line: H Tenri Line
- Distance: 3.2 km (2.0 miles)
- Platforms: 2 island platforms
- Tracks: 2
- Train operators: Kintetsu Railway
- Connections: None

Construction
- Structure type: At grade
- Parking: None
- Cycle facilities: Available
- Accessible: Yes

Other information
- Station code: H34
- Website: Official website

History
- Opened: 7 February 1915
- Electrified: 1922

Passengers
- 2019: 1645 daily
Services
Preceding station	Kintetsu Railway	Following station
H Tenri Line
Nikaidō towards Kyōto, Shin-Tanabe, Yamato-Saidaiji or Hirahata	Local	Tenri Terminus
Nikaidō towards Kyōto or Yamato-Saidaiji	Express	Tenri Terminus
Location
- Location within Nara Prefecture Location within Japan

Senzai Station (前栽駅, Senzai eki) is a passenger railway station located in the city of Tenri, Nara Prefecture, Japan. It is operated by the private transportation company, Kintetsu Railway.

== Lines ==
Senzai Station is served by the Tenri Line and is 3.2 km (2.0 mi) from the starting point of the line at Hirahara and 1.3 kilometers from Tenri.

== Layout ==
The station an above-ground station with one island platform and two tracks. The effective length of the platform is long enough for six cars. the station building and the platform are connected by an underground passage.

== Platforms and tracks ==
1	■ Tenri Line	for Tenri

2	■ Tenri Line	for Yamato-Saidaiji and Kyoto

== History ==
The station was opened on 7 February 1915 by the Tenri Light Railway, which was acquired by the Osaka Electric Tramway in 1921. The rail gauge was widen into 1435 mm the following year. The company merged with the Sangu Express Railway on March 15, 1941 to become the Kansai Express Railway. The Kansai Express Railway merged with the Nankai Railway to form Kintetsu on June 1, 1944.

== Passenger statistics ==
In fiscal 2019, the station was used by an average of 1645 passengers daily (boarding passengers only).

== Surrounding area ==
- Tenri Municipal Medical Center
- Tenri University

== See also ==
- List of railway stations in Japan
