= Interprovincial Professional Hockey League =

The Interprovincial Professional Hockey League was a short-lived ice hockey league in the Canadian Maritimes. Each of the three teams played each other four times, two home, two away. The league operated for the 1910–11 season, before folding. The Maritime Professional Hockey League took its place the following season.

== 1910–11 season ==
Note: W = Wins, L = Losses, T = Ties, GF= Goals For, GA = Goals Against

Interprovincial Professional Hockey League	GP	W	L	T	GF	GA	Pts
Moncton Victorias	8	6	2	0	35	12	12
Halifax Crescents	8	5	3	0	45	41	10
New Glasgow Cubs	8	1	7	0	35	66	2
