= George Franklin Barber =

American architect (1854–1915)

George F. Barber
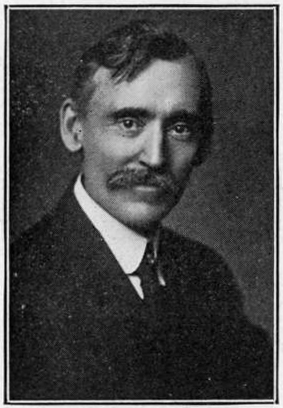
- ca. 1910
- Born: George Franklin Barber; July 31, 1854; DeKalb, Illinois, USA
- Died: February 17, 1915 (aged 60); Knoxville, Tennessee, USA
- Resting place: Greenwood Cemetery, Knoxville
- Occupation: Architect
- Spouse: Laura Cheney
- Children: Charles, George, Jr., Laura
- Parent(s): Lyman and Cornelia Barber

George Franklin Barber (July 31, 1854 – February 17, 1915) was an American architect known for the house designs he marketed worldwide through mail-order catalogs. Barber was one of the most successful residential architects of the late Victorian period in the United States, and his plans were used for houses in all 50 U.S. states, and in nations as far away as Japan and the Philippines. Over four dozen Barber houses are individually listed on the National Register of Historic Places, and several dozen more are listed as part of historic districts.

Barber began designing houses in his native DeKalb, Illinois, in the late 1880s, before permanently moving his base to Knoxville, Tennessee, in 1888. His first widely circulated catalog, Cottage Souvenir No. 2, contained designs and floor plans for 59 houses, mostly in the Queen Anne style, as well as Barber's architectural philosophy and tips for homebuilders. Later catalogs contained more Colonial designs. By the time his catalog business ended in 1908, Barber had sold upwards of 20,000 plans.

Barber was the father of Charles I. Barber (1887–1962), who became a successful architect in his own right and designed several notable buildings in the Knoxville area during the first half of the 20th century. BarberMcMurry, an architectural firm cofounded by Charles Barber in 1915, still operates in Knoxville.

== Biography ==
=== Early life and career ===
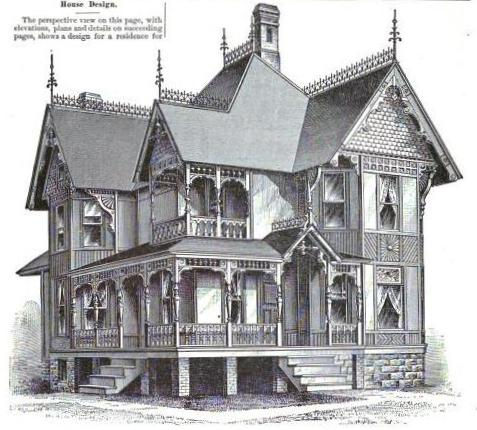
The Charles E. Bradt House, one of Barber's first designs

Barber was born in DeKalb, Illinois, in 1854, the son of Lyman and Cornelia Spring Barber. While still a young child, he moved to Marmaton, Kansas, where he lived on the farm of his sister, Olive, and her husband, William Barrett. By the 1870s, he owned an adjacent farm, where he raised plants which he advertised as "ornamental nursery stock." During this period, he learned architecture through mail-order books, namely George Palliser's American Cottage Homes and technical books published by A.J. Bicknell and Company. In 1884, Barber patented a nail-holding attachment for hammers.

By the mid-1880s, Barber was back in DeKalb, where he produced his first architectural designs working for his brother's construction firm, Barber and Boardman, Contractors and Builders. In 1887 or early 1888, Barber published The Cottage Souvenir, crudely produced on punched card stock and tied together with a piece of yarn, which contained 14 house plans (a revised edition published shortly afterward contained 18). The earliest buildings constructed from Barber's designs include the Charles E. Bradt House (1887) and the Congregational Church (1888), both in DeKalb. The Bradt house was featured in the March 1888 issue of Carpentry and Building.

=== Catalog business ===
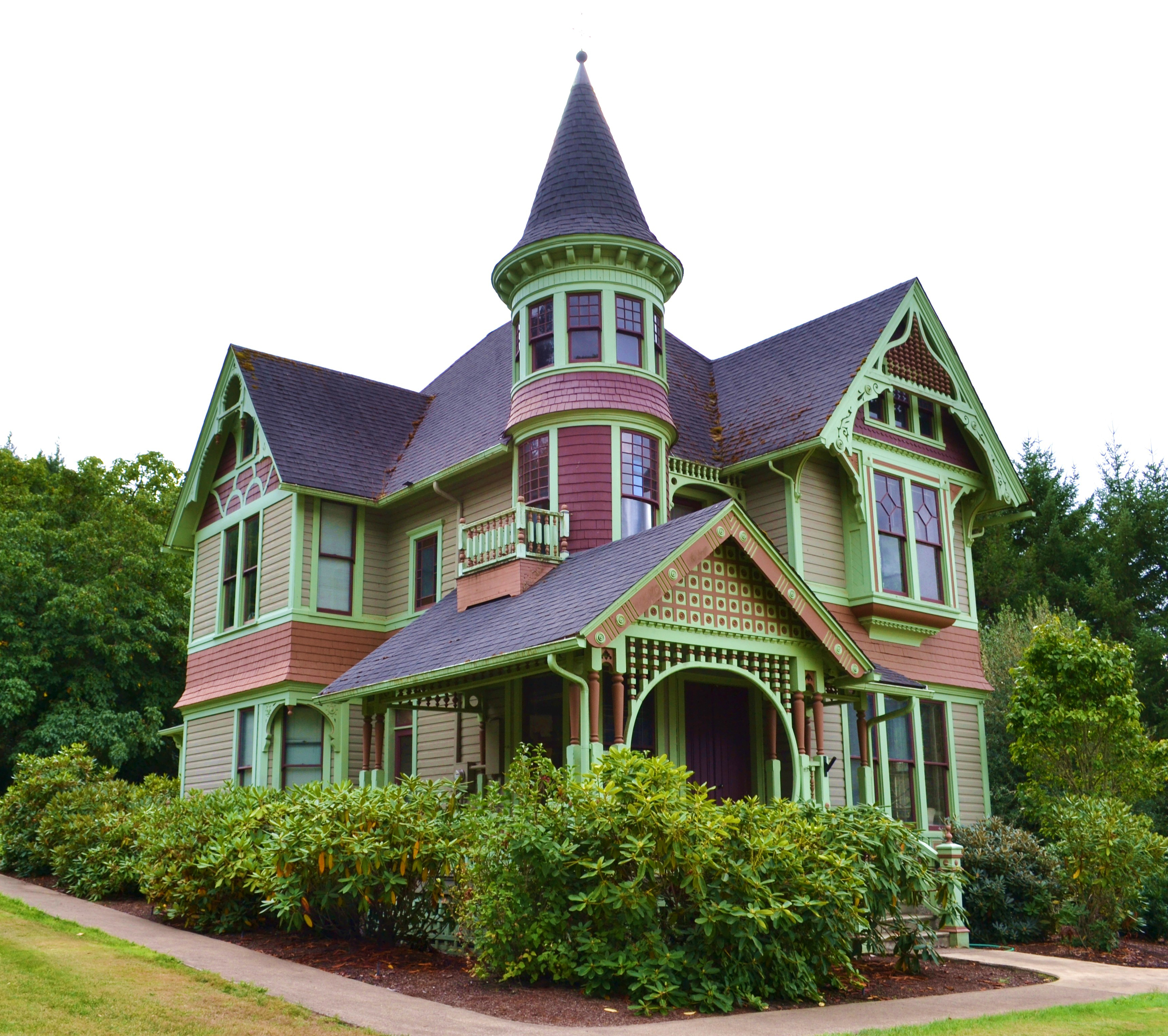
The Charles and Anna Drain House (Drain Castle), built in Drain, Oregon between 1893 and 1895.

In late 1888, Barber relocated to Knoxville, Tennessee, in hopes that the city's mountainous climate would be better for his declining health. He briefly partnered with Minnesota-born architect Martin Parmalee, but the partnership proved unsatisfactory. In 1892, he established a firm with one of his clients, J.C. White, handling the firm's business aspects. Barber also became a partner in the Edgewood Land Improvement Company, which was developing a suburb east of Knoxville known as Park City (modern Parkridge). He designed over a dozen houses for this suburb, including his own house, which still stands at 1635 Washington Avenue, and the W.O. Haworth and F.E. McArthur houses, which still stand on Washington and Jefferson Avenues and appeared in some of Barber's catalogs.

In 1890, Barber published The Cottage Souvenir No. 2, which contained 59 house plans, as well as plans for 2 barns, a chapel, a church, 2 storefronts, and several pavilions. This catalog and its subsequent revisions led to an explosion in orders for Barber's firm. Barber houses built during this period include the Jeremiah Nunan House in Jacksonville, Oregon, the Donnelly House in Mount Dora, Florida, and the J. Hawkins Hart House in Henderson, Kentucky, all of which still stand and are listed on the National Register. He also remained active on a local level in Knoxville, with the Romanesque-inspired Isaac Ziegler House on 4th Avenue, and a house built for his printer, S.B. Newman, which still stands in Old North Knoxville.

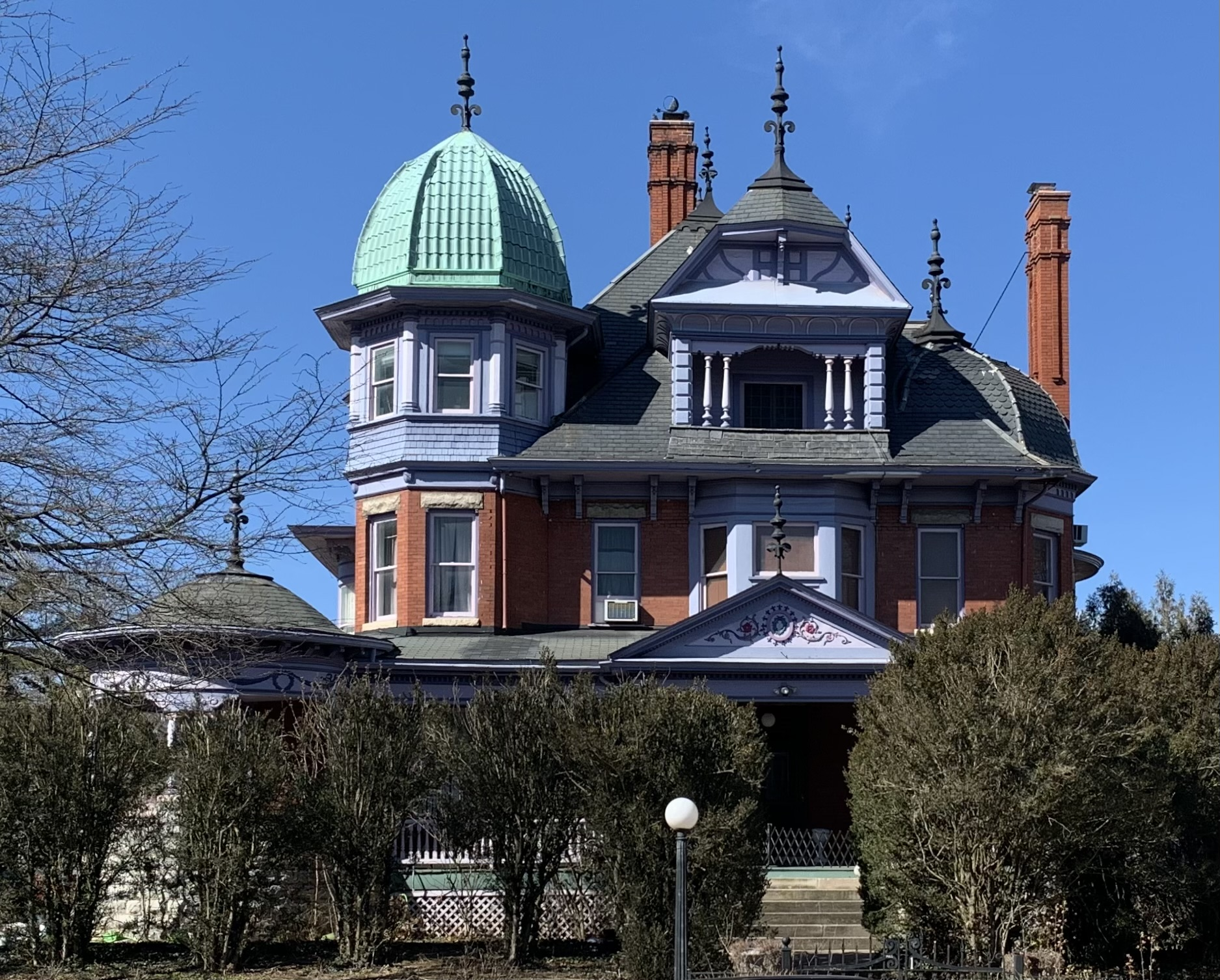
William H. Baker House (The Gables) in Winchester, Virginia, built in 1899

Around 1895, Barber parted ways with White and formed a new firm with a new partner, Thomas Kluttz. That year, Barber began publishing a magazine, American Homes, which advertised the firm's latest house plans, offered tips on landscaping and interior design, and published a multi-part history of architecture by Louisville architect Charles Hite-Smith. In 1896, the growing firm moved into the Barber-designed French and Roberts Building on Gay Street, with the firm's 30 draftsmen and 20 secretaries occupying an entire floor.

=== Later career ===
In the late 1890s and early 1900s, Barber designed several elaborate mansions for affluent businessmen, including the home of Carroll Lathrop Post (brother of C. W. Post) in Battle Creek, Michigan; the home of tobacco magnate R. J. Reynolds in Winston-Salem, North Carolina; the home of People's Bank president N.E. Graham in East Brady, Pennsylvania; and one of his grandest designs, the $40,000 "Mount Athos" for Barboursville, Virginia, tycoon Walter G. Newman.

In the early 1900s, Barber began to phase out his mail-order business and with the help of his brother, Manly, focused on Knoxville-area building projects. He later worked with architects R. F. Graf and John Ryno. The publication of American Homes was moved to New York in 1902, though Barber remained a regular contributor for several years afterward. The catalog business was suspended in 1908. Barber died on February 17, 1915, and is interred with his family in Knoxville's Greenwood Cemetery.

== Works ==
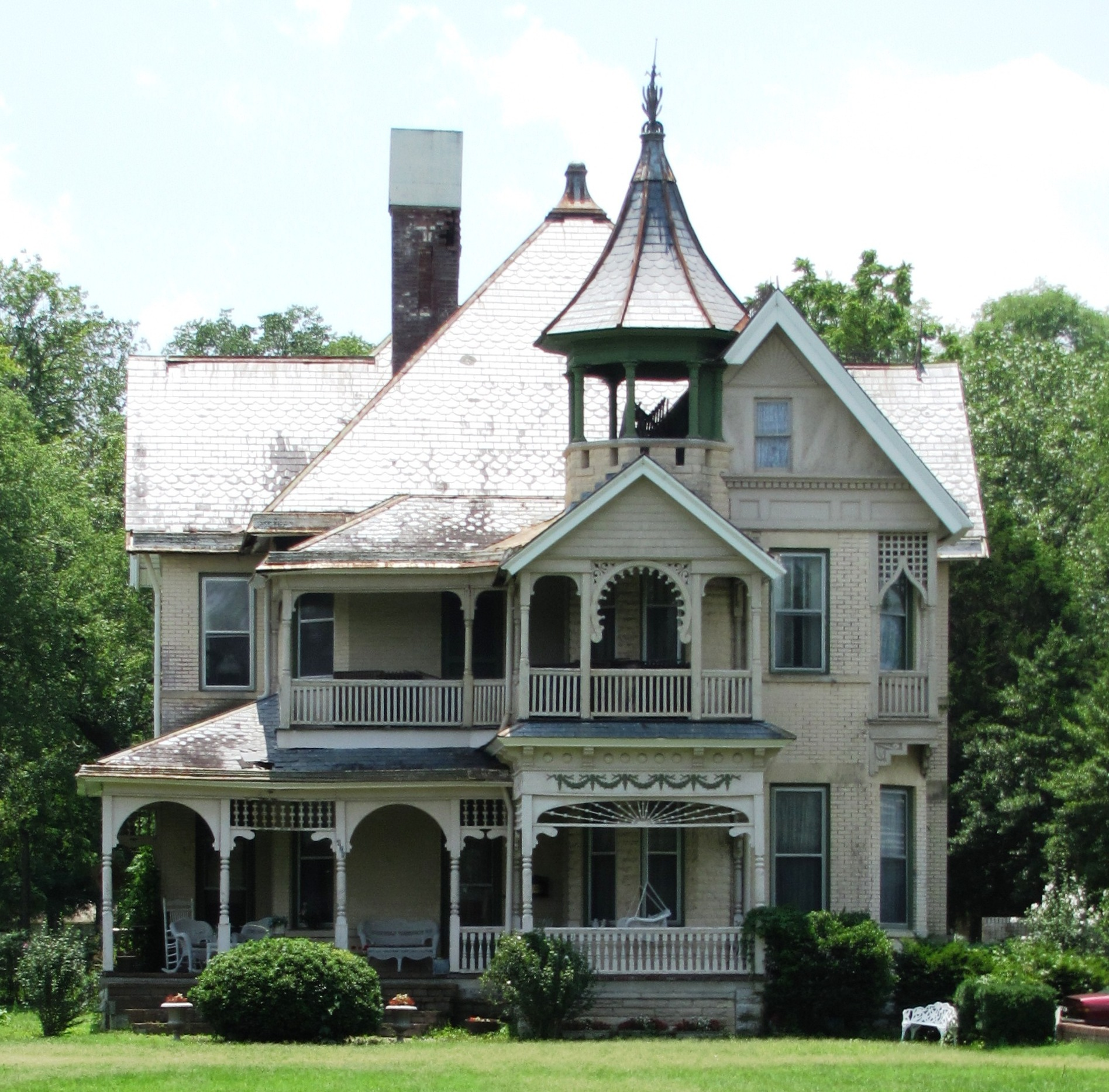
The Queen Anne-style I.W.P. Buchanan House in Lebanon, Tennessee

The bulk of Barber's business followed the "catalog architecture" model popularized by earlier architects such as Palliser, Palliser & Company. Barber's great innovation was his willingness to personalize his designs for individual clients at moderate cost. As he wrote in his Cottage Souvenir No. 2, "Write to us concerning any changes wanted in plans, and keep writing till you get what you want. Don't be afraid of writing too often. We are not easily offended." Though his firms' records no longer survive, it is believed that he sold as many as 20,000 plans in his career. Since he frequently modified his designs to fit his clients' needs and specifications, his houses are sometimes difficult to attribute with any certainty.

In discussing his architectural philosophy, Barber argued that nature has "faithfully and accurately adhered to the Divine law of harmony," and that no place should adhere more closely to the fundamental principles of nature than one's house. Barber considered proportion the most important element in architecture, likening it to harmony in music, "without which all else is a failure." He described ornamentation as the next most important element, as it gives proportion expression. Lastly was "harmony of form," or the relationship of curved and straight lines to one another.

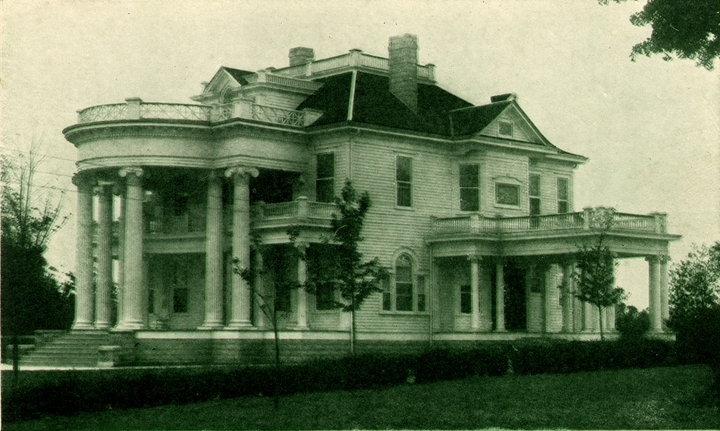
The Robert Covington House in Hazlehurst, Mississippi, one of Barber's later designs

Barber's early designs were modified versions of the Queen Anne style, which Barber liked to enrich with the addition of Romanesque elements. Barber houses constructed in this period are characterized by features such imposing turrets, projecting windows, verandas flanked by circular pavilions, and Syrian arches. In the latter half of the 1890s, Barber began to offer more plans in the Colonial Revival style. These were often characterized by projecting porticos supported by large columns, symmetrical facades, and flat decks with balustrades. Later Barber catalogs contained Bungalow and Craftsman styles, though few of these were built.

Some have suggested that Barber was the first to sell prefabricated houses in crates, but there is no evidence that he was actually engaged in manufacturing. While he occasionally supplied builders with manufactured windows, doors, staircases and other components, and millwork companies advertised in Barber's magazine, it is unclear whether entire houses were sold as kits by anyone prior to 1900.

=== Barber houses today ===
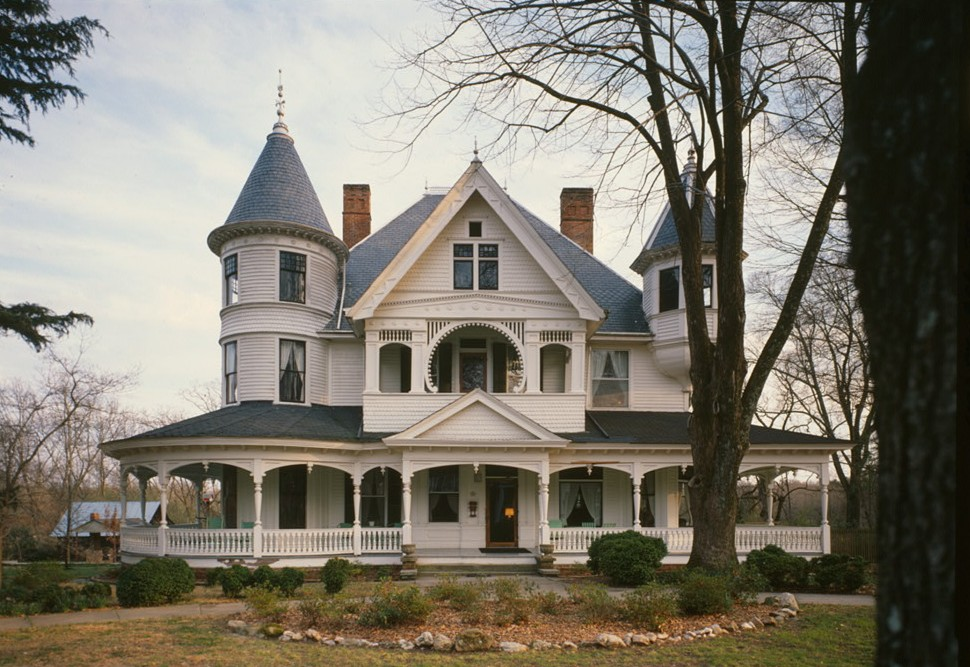
The John Owings House in Laurens, South Carolina

A revived interest in Barber's work began in the 1970s, and since then, hundreds of houses built using his plans have been identified. Over four dozen of these have been individually listed on the National Register of Historic Places for their architecture, and several dozen more have been listed as contributing properties in historic districts. At least four Barber houses—the Isaac Ziegler House, the Jeremiah Nunan House, the John Calvin Owings House (Laurens, South Carolina), and Roselawn (Natchitoches, Louisiana)— =have been documented by the Historic American Buildings Survey.

Many extant Barber houses are still used as residences, while others house museums, bed and breakfasts, and office space. Barber houses have provided inspiration for Christmas cards, wall hangings, and at least one dollhouse model. While most of Barber's work was domestic, several notable non-domestic Barber-designed buildings survive. These include the Congregational Church (now DeKalb Foursquare Church) in DeKalb, Illinois; the Raper Building in Lexington, North Carolina; and Bartlett Hall at Maryville College.

== Bibliography ==
=== Catalogs ===
- Modern Artistic Cottages, or The Cottage Souvenir, Designed to Meet the Wants of Mechanics and Home Builders (c. 1887–1888)
- The Cottage Souvenir No. 2: Containing 120 Original Designs in Cottage and Detail Architecture (1891)
- The Cottage Souvenir Revised and Enlarged: Containing Over Two Hundred Original Designs and Plans of Artistic Dwellings (1892)
- Artistic Homes: How to Plan and How to Build Them (1895)
- New Model Dwellings and How Best to Build Them: Containing a Great Variety of Designs, Plans and Interior Views of Modern Dwellings (c. 1896)
- Modern Dwellings and Their Proper Construction: A Book of Practical Designs and Information for Those Who Wish to Build and Beautify Their Homes (1899)
- Art in Architecture: With the Modern Architectural Designer for Those who Wish to Build or Beautify Their Homes (c. 1902–1903)
- American Homes: A Book of Everything for Those who are Planning to Build or Beautify Their Homes (1907)

=== Magazines ===
- American Homes: A Journal Devoted to Planning, Building, and Beautifying the Home (1895–1902; published by Charles Hite-Smith, 1902–1904)

=== Other ===
- Appreciation (1896)

== See also ==
- Baumann family (architects)
- Eastlake movement
- Stick-Eastlake
- Shingle Style architecture
