= Eastern Professional Hockey League (1914–15) =

The Eastern Professional Hockey League (1914–15) was an ice hockey league that was formed from the remainder of the Maritime Professional Hockey League (1912-1914) teams. It consisted of a three team league that operated for a part of the 1914-15 season. The New Glasgow Black Foxes and Sydney Millionaires from the MaPHL were joined by the new Glace Bay Miners. The Black Foxes folded on January 7, 1915 and the league folded on February 7 with an incomplete season.

== 1914–15 season ==
Note: W = Wins, L = Losses, T = Ties, GF= Goals For, GA = Goals Against, Pts = Points

Eastern Professional Hockey League	GP	W	L	T	GF	GA	Pts
Glace Bay Miners	7	5	2	0	37	24	10
New Glasgow Black Foxes	7	3	4	0	32	46	6
Sydney Millionaires	8	3	5	0	46	45	6
