= Maritime Professional Hockey League =

The Maritime Professional Hockey League (MaPHL) was a professional men's ice hockey league operating in New Brunswick and Nova Scotia from around 1911 until 1914. Two of the league's champions challenged for the Stanley Cup. The league was preceded in 1910–11 by the Interprovincial Professional Hockey League and followed in 1914–15 by the Eastern Professional Hockey League.

== History ==
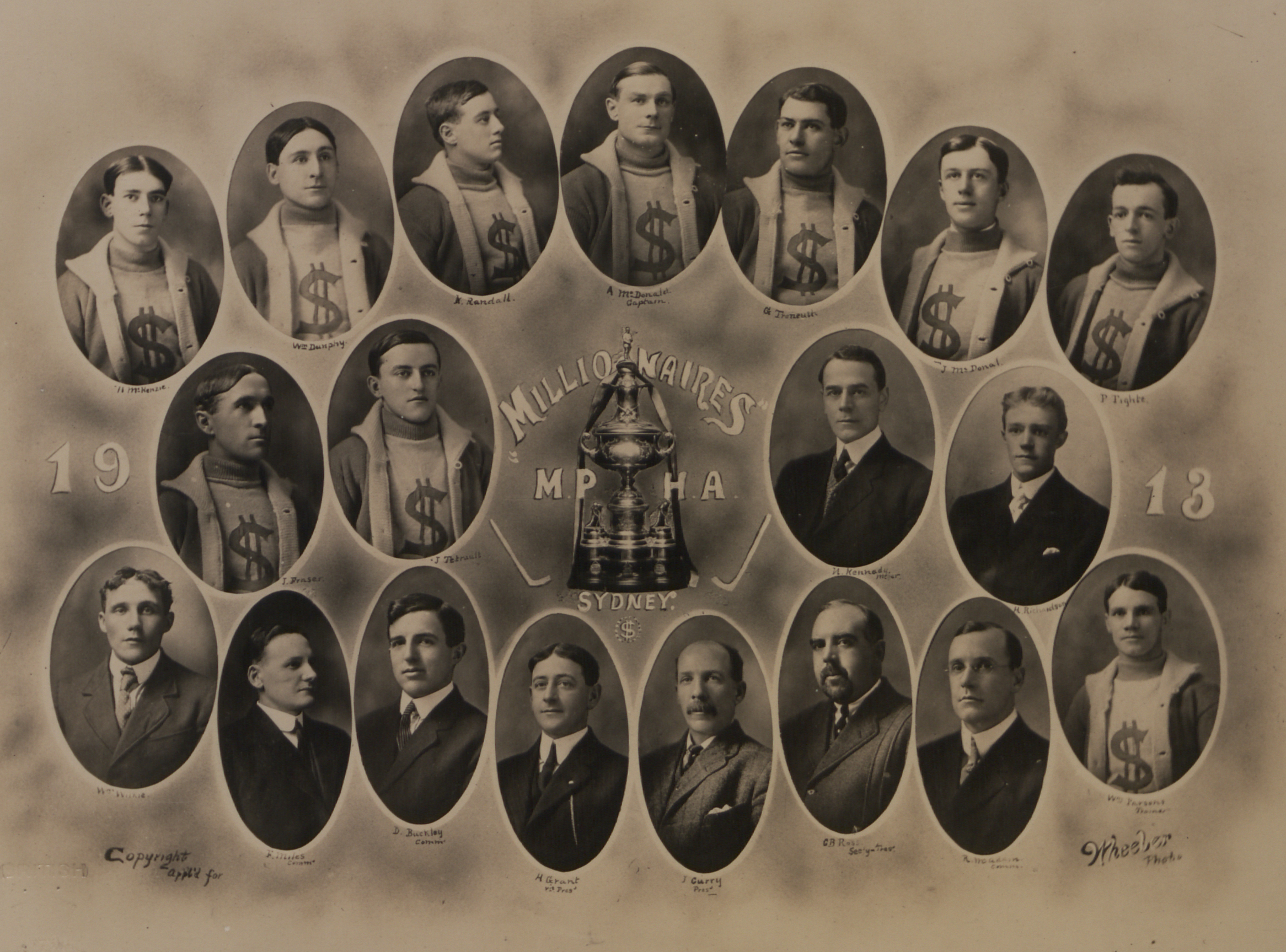
The 1913 Sydney Millionaires Professional Ice Hockey Team, Maritime Professional Hockey Association champs, Stanley Cup Challengers.

Originally the Maritime Hockey League, the loop was created as an amateur ice hockey league operating in Nova Scotia around 1900. The league is notable for having several teams challenge for the Stanley Cup.

Stanley Cup Challengers:

- 1900 – Halifax Crescents
- 1906 – New Glasgow Cubs

As part of the general progression of elite ice hockey leagues to paid professionals in the time period around 1910, the league made the switch official in 1910, calling itself the Interprovincial Professional Hockey League. The name changed again in 1911 to the Maritime Professional Hockey League and once again in 1914 to the Eastern Professional Hockey League. The EPHL suspended operations on February 7, 1915 after having shrunk to only two teams.

Two MaPHL champions went on to challenge the NHA champion for the Stanley Cup:

- 1912 – Moncton Victorias
- 1913 – Sydney Millionaires

In September 1913, the MaPHL arranged with the NHA and the Pacific Coast Hockey Association (PCHA) for the formation of a hockey commission to govern inter-league operations, contract issues and the play of the Stanley Cup between the league champions. In 1914, it was expected that the MaPHL champion would play the Toronto Blueshirts of the NHA for the Stanley Cup, but this was cancelled and Maritime champions did not play for the Stanley Cup again.

== Seasons ==
=== 1911–12 season ===
The Halifax Socials joined the three teams from the IPHL: the Moncton Victorias, the New Glasgow Cubs, and the Halifax Crescents. Each team played the other three teams six times, three home, three away.

Note: W = Wins, L = Losses, T = Ties, GF= Goals For, GA = Goals Against, Pts = Points

| Maritime Professional Hockey League | GP | W | L | T | GF | GA | Pts |
|---|---|---|---|---|---|---|---|
| Moncton Victorias | 18 | 12 | 6 | 0 | 106 | 80 | 24 |
| New Glasgow Cubs | 18 | 10 | 8 | 0 | 108 | 80 | 20 |
| Halifax Socials | 18 | 7 | 11 | 0 | 100 | 126 | 14 |
| Halifax Crescents | 18 | 7 | 11 | 0 | 94 | 122 | 14 |

=== 1912–13 season ===
The Sydney Millionaires join the league making five teams that play the others four times each, two home, two away. After the season, the Millionaires would make an unsuccessful challenge against the Quebec Bulldogs for the Stanley Cup.

| Maritime Professional Hockey League | GP | W | L | T | GF | GA | Pts |
|---|---|---|---|---|---|---|---|
| Sydney Millionaires | 16 | 11 | 5 | 0 | 71 | 60 | 22 |
| New Glasgow Cubs | 16 | 10 | 6 | 0 | 89 | 58 | 20 |
| Moncton Victorias | 16 | 9 | 7 | 0 | 71 | 63 | 18 |
| Halifax Socials | 16 | 8 | 8 | 0 | 66 | 67 | 16 |
| Halifax Crescents | 16 | 2 | 14 | 0 | 44 | 95 | 4 |

=== 1913–14 season ===
The New Glasgow Cubs are renamed the New Glasgow Black Foxes. The Moncton Victorias fold bringing the league back to four teams, each playing the others eight times, four home, four away. The Millionaires do not play a planned Stanley Cup challenge against the Toronto Blueshirts.

| Maritime Professional Hockey League | GP | W | L | T | GF | GA | Pts |
|---|---|---|---|---|---|---|---|
| Sydney Millionaires | 24 | 16 | 8 | 0 | 131 | 113 | 32 |
| New Glasgow Black Foxes | 24 | 16 | 8 | 0 | 162 | 117 | 32 |
| Halifax Crescents | 24 | 12 | 12 | 0 | 108 | 107 | 24 |
| Halifax Socials | 24 | 4 | 20 | 0 | 97 | 161 | 8 |

== Teams ==
- Glace Bay Miners – 1914–1915
- Halifax Crescents – 1910–1914
- Halifax Socials – 1911–1914
- Moncton Victorias – 1910–1913
- New Glasgow Cubs – 1910–1913, New Glasgow Black Foxes – 1913–1915
- Sydney Millionaires – 1912–1915

== See also ==
- List of Stanley Cup champions
