= 貴子 =

貴子, 贵子 or 귀자, meaning 'noble, child', may refer to:

- Atsuko, a Japanese feminine given name
- Guizi, Xinyi, Maoming, Guangdong, China
- Gwija, a given name for South Korean writer Yang Gwija (born 1955)
- Kiko, a Japanese feminine given name
- Takako, a Japanese feminine given name

== See also ==
- Guizi, a Chinese slang term
- Kiko (disambiguation)
