= Takako Shirai =

Takako Shirai may refer to:

- Takako Shirai (volleyball)
- Takako Shirai (singer)
