= Takako =

- Pronunciation: (TAH-kah-koh)
- Gender: Female

Origin
- Origin: Japanese
- Meaning: Many different meanings depending on the kanji used
- Region of origin: Japan

Takako is a feminine Japanese given name.

== Written forms ==
- 江子, "estuary/inlet, child"
- 孝子, "filial piety/serve parents, child"
- 高子, "tall/expensive, child"
- 崇子, "adore/rever, child"
- 隆子, "prosper, child"
- 喬子, "high/boasting, child"
- 尭子, "high/far, child"
- 昂子, "rise, child"
- 峻子, "high/steep, child"
- 嵩子, "swell, child"
- 貴子, "noble, child"
- 多佳子, "many, good, child"
- 多香子, "many fragrances, child"
- たかこ, in hiragana
- タカコ, in katakana

== People with the given name ==
- Takako Akasaka (赤阪 尊子; born 1955), Japanese competitive eater
- Takako Aonuma (青沼 貴子; born 1960), Japanese manga artist
- Takako Doi (土井 たか子; 1928–2014), Japanese politician
- Takako Ebata (江端 貴子; born 1959), Japanese politician
- Takako Fuji (藤 貴子; born 1972), Japanese actress and voice actress
- Takako Fujita (藤田 多佳子), Japanese Paralympic swimmer
- Takako Hasegawa (長谷川 たか子; born 1951), Japanese gymnast
- Takako Hashimoto (橋本 多佳子; 1899-1963), Japanese haiku writer
- Takako Hirasawa (平澤 貴子; born 1975), known as Double, Japanese R&B singer
- Takako Honda (本田 貴子; born 1972), Japanese voice actress
- Takako Ida (井田 貴子; born 1972), Japanese former badminton player
- Takako Iida (飯田 高子; born 1946), Japanese volleyball player
- Takako Inoguchi (井口 任子; born 1942), Japanese sprinter
- Takako Inoue (井上 貴子; born 1969), Japanese professional wrestler
- Takako Irie (入江 たか子; 1911–1995), Japanese actress
- Takako Ishii (石井 貴子; born 1990), Japanese track cyclist
- Takako Katou (加藤 貴子; born 1970), Japanese actress and singer
- Takako Katō (加藤 貴子; born 1971), Japanese female former professional basketball player
- Takako Kobayashi (小林 貴子; born 1968), Japanese judoka
- Takako Konishi (office worker) (コニシ タカコ; 1973–2001), Japanese office worker and suicide victim
- Takako Konishi (小西 貴子; born 1986), Japanese synchronized swimmer
- Takako Kotorida (小鳥田 貴子; born 1977), Japanese long-distance runner
- Takako Kunigoshi (国越 孝子; 1909–2000), Japanese practitioner of aikido
- Takako Mamiya (間宮 貴子), Japanese singer
- Takako Matsu (松 たか子; born 1977), Japanese actress and singer-songwriter
- Takako Minekawa (嶺川 貴子; born 1969), Japanese musician, composer and writer
- Takako Miyake (三宅 貴子; born 1974), Japanese retired athlete
- Takako Nagae (永江 孝子; born 1960), Japanese politician
- Takako Nakamoto (中本 たか子; 1903–1991), Japanese novelist and activist
- Takako Nishizaki (西崎 崇子; born 1944), Japanese violinist
- Takako Oguchi (小口 貴子; born 1984), Japanese skeleton racer
- Takako Okamura (岡村 孝子; born 1962), Japanese singer
- Takako Ōta (太田 貴子; born 1967), Japanese idol singer and voice actress
- Takako Saito (斉藤 陽子; 1929–2025), Japanese visual artist
- Takako Saito (wrestler) (斉藤 貴子; born 1983), Japanese sport wrestler
- Takako Sasuga (貴家 堂子; 1936–2023), Japanese actress and voice actress
- Takako Shigematsu (しげまつ 貴子), Japanese manga artist
- Takako Shimazu (島津 貴子; born 1939), Japanese princess
- Takako Shimura (志村 貴子; born 1973), Japanese manga artist
- Takako Shirai (白井 貴子; born 1959), Japanese singer
- Takako Shirai (volleyball) (白井 貴子; born 1952), Japanese volleyball player
- Takako Suzuki (鈴木 貴子; born 1986), Japanese politician
- Takako Takahashi (高橋 たか子; 1932–2013), Japanese writer
- Takashina no Takako (高階 貴子; died 996), Japanese waka poet
- Takako Tanaka (田中 貴子), Japanese voice actress
- Takako Tezuka (手塚 貴子; born 1970), Japanese former football player and manager
- Takako Tobise (born 1974), Japanese female former long-distance runner
- Takako Tokiwa (常盤 貴子; born 1972), Japanese actress
- Takako Uehara (上原 多香子; born 1983), Japanese singer and actress
- Takako Yamaguchi (born 1952), Japanese visual artist

== Fictional characters ==
- Takako Chigusa (千草貴子), a main character from the Battle Royale novel, film, and manga
- Takako Shimizu (清水多香子), a character from the manga series Chobits and its anime adaption
- Takako Itsukushima (厳島 貴子), a main character in the novel and anime series Otome wa Boku ni Koishiteru
- Takako Sugiura (杉浦多佳子), a character from the mystery horror novel Another and its manga and anime adaptions
- Takako, the titular fly in the French animated comedy series Hubert & Takako
