= Miyaji =

Miyaji may refer to

- Miyaji (surname)
- Miyaji Station, a railway station in Aso, Kumamoto, Japan
- 8303 Miyaji, a minor planet
