= Kiko =

Kiko or KIKO may refer to:

== People ==
- Kiko (given name), includes a list of people with the given name or nickname
- Kiko (footballer, born 1972), Spanish footballer Francisco Miguel Narváez Machón
- Kiko (footballer, born 1978), Brazilian footballer Josualdo Alves da Silva Oliveira
- Kiko (footballer, born 1988), Spanish footballer Francisco José Olivas
- Kiko (footballer, born 1993), Portuguese footballer Francisco Manuel Geraldo Rosa
- Kiko (footballer, born 1998), Andorran footballer Francisco Pomares Ortega
- Kiko (footballer, born 2000), Portuguese footballer Francisco Pereira Carnerio
- Kiko Costa, nickname for the Portuguese handball player Francisco Costa (born 2005)
- Kiko Ratón, Spanish footballer Francisco José González Expósito (born 1976)
- Kiko, Crown Princess of Japan (born 1966), a member of the Japanese imperial family
- Kiko, one of several stage names used by Francis Magalona (1964–2009), Filipino rapper
- Kiko Mizuhara, stage name of American/Japanese actress and model Audrie Kiko Daniel (born 1990)

== Music ==
- Kiko (album), by Los Lobos
- Kiko, a 2015 compilation album by Panda Eyes
- Kiko, a 2019 studio album by Gilli

== Other uses ==
- List of storms named Kiko
- Kiko (TV series), a children's animated series
- Kiko goat, a breed of goat from New Zealand
- Kikō-ji, a Buddhist temple in Nara, Japan
- Kikō, the Japanese form of the Chinese term qigong
- KIKO (AM), a radio station (1340 AM) licensed to Apache Junction, Arizona, United States
- KIKO-FM, a radio station (96.5 FM) licensed to Claypool, Arizona

== See also ==
- Keiko (disambiguation)
- Kikos (disambiguation)
- Koko (disambiguation)
- Quico (disambiguation)
- 貴子 (disambiguation)
