= Amagatsuji Station =

Railway station in Nara, Nara Prefecture, Japan

Amagatsuji Station 尼ヶ辻駅
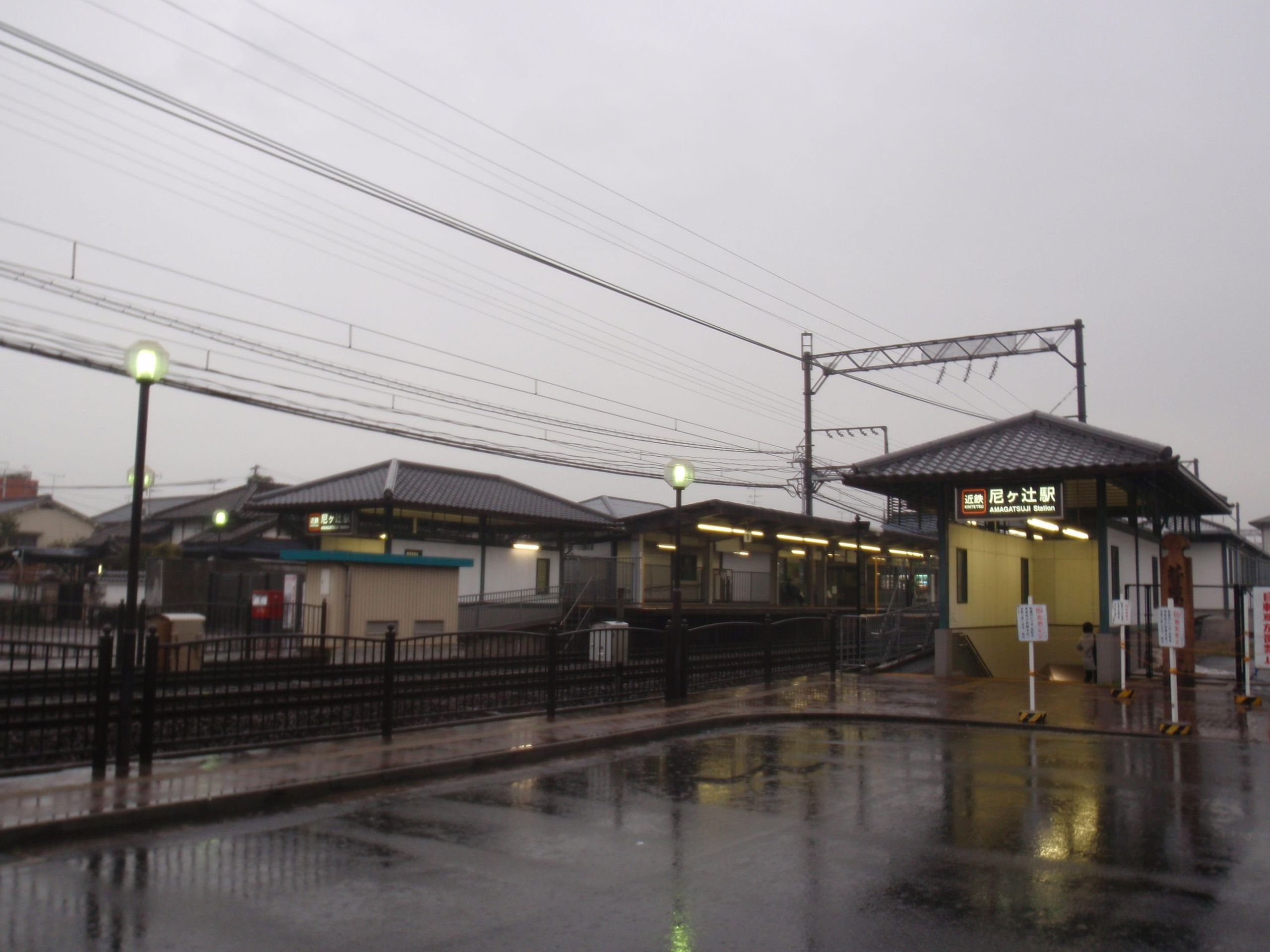
- Amagatsuji Station in April 2011

General information
- Location: 11-1, Amagatsuji-Nakamachi, Nara-shi, Nara-ken 630-8024; Japan
- Coordinates: 34°40′53″N 135°47′01″E
- System: Kintetsu Railway commuter rail station
- Owner: Kintetsu Railway
- Operator: Kintetsu Railway
- Line: B Kashihara Line
- Distance: 1.6 km (0.99 miles)
- Platforms: 2 side platforms
- Tracks: 2
- Train operators: Kintetsu Railway
- Bus stands: 1
- Connections: Nara Kotsu Bus Lines: 39・40・41・43・48

Construction
- Structure type: At grade
- Parking: None
- Cycle facilities: Available
- Accessible: Yes (2 elevators for the ticket gate, 2 elevators for the platforms, and 1 bathroom)

Other information
- Station code: B27
- Website: Official website

History
- Opened: 1 April 1921
- Rebuilt: 2000

Passengers
- 2019: 2,516 daily
Services
Preceding station	Kintetsu Railway	Following station
B Kashihara Line
Yamato-Saidaiji towards Kyōto or Shin-Tanabe	Local	Nishinokyō towards Kashiharajingū-mae or Tenri
Yamato-Saidaiji Terminus	Local	Nishinokyō towards Kashiharajingū-mae or Tenri
Location

Amagatsuji Station (尼ヶ辻駅, Amagatsuji-eki) is a passenger railway station located in the city of Nara, Nara Prefecture, Japan. It is operated by the private transportation company, Kintetsu Railway.

== Line ==
Amagatsuji Station is served by the Kashihara Line and is 1.6 kilometers from the starting point of the line at Yamato-Saidaiji and 36.2 kilometers from Kyoto.

== Layout ==
The station consists two opposed side platforms and two tracks. The effective length of the platform is four cars. The ticket gates and concourse are underground, while the platforms are above ground. There are two ticket gates, one on the east side and one on the west side. The entrances and exits are on the Yamato-Saidaiji side of both platforms. The station is unattended.

== Platforms ==
1	■ B Kashihara Line	for Yamato-Yagi and Kashihara-Jingumae
2	■ B Kashihara Line	for Yamato-Saidaiji and Kyoto

== History ==
Amagatsuji Station was opened 1 April 1921 as a station on the Osaka Electric Tramway Unebi Line (now the Kashihara Line). The station became a Kansai Express Railway station due to a company merger with Sangu Express Railway in 1941, which became part of the Kintetsu Railway network in 1944. The station was rebuilt as an underground station in 2000.

== Passenger statistics ==
In fiscal 2019, the station was used by an average of 2,516 passengers daily (boarding passengers only).

== Surrounding area ==
- National Route 308
- Kikō-ji Temple
- Tōshōdai-ji Temple

== See also ==
- List of railway stations in Japan
