= Atsuko =

- Pronunciation: atsɯko (IPA)
- Gender: Female

Origin
- Origin: Japanese
- Meaning: different meanings depending on the kanji used

Other names
- Alternative spelling: Atuko (Kunrei-shiki) Atuko (Nihon-shiki) Atsuko (Hepburn)

Atsuko is a feminine Japanese given name.

== Written forms ==
Atsuko can be written using different combinations of kanji characters. Here are some examples:

- 惇子, "kind, child"
- 淳子, "pure, child"
- 敦子, "kindliness, child"
- 篤子, "fervent, child"
- 厚子, "thick, child"
- 渥子, "kindness, child"
- 湊子, "harbor, child"
- 集子, "collect, child"
- 鳩子, "pigeon, child"
- 熱子, "heat, child"
- 温子, "warm, child"
- 充子, "sufficient, child"
- 貴子, "noble, child"

Atsuko is generally used as a girl's name. The final syllable "ko" is generally written with the kanji character for child (子). It is a common suffix to female names in Japan and usually indicates that it is a girl's name as masculine Japanese names rarely use the kanji for "child".

The name can also be written in hiragana あつこ or katakana アツコ.

== Notable people with the name ==
- Atsuko Anzai (安西 篤子; born 1927), Japanese novelist
- Atsuko Asano (浅野 温子; born 1961), Japanese actress
- Atsuko Asano (writer) (浅野 敦子; born 1954), Japanese writer
- Atsuko Baba (馬場 敦子; born 1995), Japanese female handball player
- Atsuko Betchaku (1960–2017), Japanese pacifist and teacher
- Atsuko Enomoto (榎本 温子; born 1979), Japanese singer and voice actress
- Atsuko Hashimoto (橋本 有津子), Japanese jazz musician
- Atsuko Hirayanagi (平栁 敦子; born 1975), Japanese-American filmmaker
- Atsuko Ikeda (池田 厚子; born 1931), fourth daughter of Emperor Shōwa and Empress Kōjun
- Atsuko Inaba (稲葉 貴子; born 1974), Japanese idol and singer
- Atsuko Ishizuka (いしづか あつこ; born 1981), Japanese animator, storyboard artist and director
- Atsuko Kawada (川田 あつ子; born 1965), Japanese actress, model, singer, and author
- Atsuko Kitamura (北村 温子; born 1984), Japanese cricketer
- Atsuko Kurusu (来栖 あつこ; born 1978), Japanese actress
- Atsuko Maeda (前田 敦子; born 1990), Japanese singer, actress and idol
- Atsuko Mine (峰 あつ子; born 1951), Japanese voice actress
- Atsuko Miyaji (宮地 充子; born 1965), Japanese cryptographer and number theorist
- Atsuko Nagai (長井 淳子; born 1974), Japanese judoka
- Atsuko Nakajima (中嶋 敦子; born 1961), Japanese animator, character designer, and illustrator
- Atsuko Nambu (南部 敦子; 1934-1970), Japanese athlete
- Atsuko Nishida (西田 敦子), Japanese graphic artist
- Atsuko Okamoto (岡元 あつこ; born 1973), Japanese actress and popular celebrity
- Atsuko Okatsuka (born 1988), Japanese-American stand-up comedian, actress, and writer
- Atsuko Sakuraba (桜庭 あつこ; born 1976), Japanese gravure idol, tarento and actress
- Atsuko Seki (関 敦子; born 1964), Japanese pianist
- Atsuko Seta (瀬田 敦子; born 1955), Japanese classical pianist
- Atsuko Shimoda (下田 敦子; born 1940), Japanese politician
- Atsuko Sugimoto (杉本 充子; born 1959), Japanese sport shooter
- Atsuko Takahata (高畑 淳子; born 1954), Japanese actress and voice actress
- Atsuko Takata (高田 貴子; born 1977), Japanese speed skater
- Atsuko Tanaka (田中 敦子; 1962–2024), Japanese voice actress and narrator
- Atsuko Tanaka (animator) (田中 敦子; born 1975), Japanese animator
- Atsuko Tanaka (artist) (田中 敦子; 1932–2005), Japanese avant-garde artist
- Atsuko Tanaka (ski jumper) (田中 温子; born 1992), Canadian Olympic ski jumper
- Atsuko Toko Fish (born 1988), Japanese-American philanthropist
- Atsuko Tokuda (徳田 敦子; born 1955), Japanese former badminton player
- Atsuko Toyama (遠山 敦子; born 1938), Japanese former bureaucrat
- Atsuko Wakai (若井 敦子; born 1971), Japanese karate competitor
- Atsuko Yamano (山野 敦子; born 1964), Japanese musician
- Atsuko Yamashita (山下 敦子; born 1975), Japanese singer, vocalist of pop band Angela
- Atsuko Yuya (湯屋 敦子; born 1968), Japanese voice actress

== Fictional characters ==
- Atsuko Natsume (夏目 温子), known as Nuku Nuku, of the All Purpose Cultural Cat Girl Nuku Nuku anime (OVA & TV) series
- Atsuko Senoo (妹尾 あつこ), née Okamura, a character in the anime series Ojamajo Doremi
- Atsuko Urameshi (浦飯 温子), a character in the manga series Yu Yu Hakusho
- Atsuko "Akko" Kagami (加賀美 あつ子), titular heroine of Himitsu no Akko-chan
- Atsuko "Akko" Kagari (篝 敦子), a lead character from Little Witch Academia
- Atsuko Jackson (アツコ・ジャキソン), a character in the anime series Michiko & Hatchin
- Atsuko Mutsuzuka (六塚 温子), a character in the light novel series The Irregular at Magic High School
- Atsuko Hakari (秤 アツコ), a character in the role-playing video game Blue Archive

== See also ==
- 8414 Atsuko, a main-belt asteroid
