= List of You're Under Arrest episodes =

Logo of the series

This is a list of episodes for the You're Under Arrest anime.

== OVA ==
No.	Title	Original release date
1	"And So They Met"; Transliteration: "Soshite Futari wa Deatta" (Japanese: そしてふたりは出会った)	September 24, 1994
19-year-old Natsumi Tsujimoto is late for her first day working at Bokuto Police Precinct located at Sumida. She ends up being pursued by Miyuki Kobayakawa, an 18-year-old female police officer who ultimately welcomes her to the precinct, after getting into several traffic altercations. A man in a red Mini, named Oshō, is seen passing by the station, urging Natsumi and Miyuki to chase the car. They are contacted by him via two-way radio, informing them that he has installed fireworks that will go off in an unknown location in two hours. They figure out that the fireworks would be located under an airplane exhibited in a local park, only to find out that a boxed lunch was packaged there.
2	"Tokyo Typhoon Rally"; Transliteration: "Tōkyō Taifūn Rarī" (Japanese: 東京タイフーン・ラリー)	January 21, 1995
A typhoon has been forecast for Tokyo, issuing a severe weather advisory throughout the city. Natsumi and Miyuki retrieved a stray cat, later discovering that it is pregnant. Ken Nakajima asks Miyuki to fix his motorcycle. Natsumi and Miyuki drive through the downpour to save a man in a refrigerator truck that got into an accident, caused by an unknown man driving a yellow sports car. A blackout has occurred across the city, making it challenging to find a veterinarian to help deliver the babies of the pregnant stray cat. To make matters worse, the sports car driver appears to be tailing the two. Ken shows up to distract the driver, while the two try to make their way to a veterinary.
3	"Love's Highway Stars"; Transliteration: "Koi no Haiwei Sutā" (Japanese: 恋のハイウェイ・スター)	May 25, 1995
Natsumi, along with Yoriko Nikaido, tries to orchestrate an omiai between Miyuki and Ken, only to end in failure. Miyuki is planning to attend a class reunion in Katsuura for the weekend, while Natsumi convinces Ken to search for Miyuki. At the reunion, the female alumni discuss with Miyuki about her prospective love interest. When Miyuki returns to the police station, she spots Natsumi and Ken back together, mistaking them in an omiai. Gossips and rumors spread concerning the love triangle among Miyuki, Natsumi, and Ken. Kachou, the chief of the police department, orders Miyuki and Ken to go out on a date, while Natsumi and Yoriko survey the two.
4	"On the road, AGAIN"	November 25, 1995
Natsumi is invited by top officials from the headquarters of the Tokyo Metropolitan Police Department to be recruited as the first female bike trooper. She struggles in hesitation trying to inform Miyuki of the news. It is later discovered that Miyuki already knew about the transfer, giving her an alarm clock as a departing gift. Miyuki becomes depressed, affecting her concentration in traffic control. Natsumi decides to visit Miyuki, hinting that she wants to come back to the precinct. Natsumi is to ride in an escorted marathon. A truck is lit on fire, catching hold in its surroundings. The precinct manages to safely direct the oncoming traffic away from the flames. However, a semi-trailer truck is seen going downhill toward the area with no driver present. Natsumi rushes over to help Miyuki and Ken to halt the truck just in the nick of time. Natsumi opts to resign from the headquarters and return to the precinct, continuing her partnership with Miyuki.

=== Theme songs ===
- Openings
1. "100mph Courage" (１００ｍpｈの勇気, Hyakumairumaiji no Yūki)
  - Lyricist: Takeshi Yokoyama / Composer: Takashi Shoji / Arranger: Ryo Yonemitsu / Singers: Sakiko Tamagawa + Akiko Hiramatsu
- Endings
1. "With All the Passion Contained" (ありったけの情熱で, Arittake no Jōnetsu de)
  - Lyricist: Anju Mana / Composer: Takashi Shoji / Arranger: Ryo Yonemitsu / Singers: Sakiko Tamagawa + Akiko Hiramatsu

== Television series ==
No.	Title	Original release date
5	"The Beauty, Her Name is Aoi"; Transliteration: "Utsukushi Kimono, Nanji no Na wa Aoi" (Japanese: 美しきもの、汝の名は葵)	November 2, 1996
The Bokuto Police Precinct welcomes Aoi Futaba to the police department. It is noticed that Aoi's gender identity is that of a transgender woman, acting more feminine than masculine. Natsumi, Miyuki, and Ken are eager to help Aoi become more of a man, but soon realize that Aoi isn't cut out for it. She began presenting as a woman while working undercover to catch sexual predators and never went back. Aoi's high school friend comes to the station looking for her, explaining that her brother is being bullied by some street punks for his sneakers. Aoi, using an alias to hide her actual self, takes her friend to the scene of the crime to retrieve the sneakers, and ultimately reveals her true identity to her high school friend.
6	"Frightening Judge from Hell - Superintendent Arizuka"; Transliteration: "Kyōfu no Enma Daiō - Arizuka Keishisei" (Japanese: 恐怖の閻魔大王・蟻塚警視正)	November 9, 1996
The precinct is preparing for an inspection conducted by Takao Arizuka, the superintendent of the headquarters. Coincidentally, Natsumi is suffering from a hangover, worsening the situation. Miyuki, Ken, Yoriko, and Aoi do their best to clean up the station, while concealing all the toys and trinkets at the same time. When Arizuka arrives, he immediately finds all the collectible items that were supposedly stored away. Miyuki later gives him a tour of the station, much to his disappointment. Then it's reported that an adolescent girl in a drunken stupor has climbed to the top of a bridge to attempt suicide in front of her boyfriend. Ken is sent to convince the girl not to jump, while Aoi arrives on a firetruck ladder with rope to retrieve her. All goes wrong when the girl falls off the bridge. Nevertheless, Natsumi and Miyuki are able to save her.
7	"The Messenger of Justice? The Mysterious Strike Man!"; Transliteration: "Seigi no Shisha? Kaiketsu Sutoraiku Otoko!" (Japanese: 正義の使者？怪傑ストライク男！)	November 16, 1996
A baseball-themed vigilante, deeming himself Strike Man, is seen running amok, seemingly practicing criminal justice on innocent citizens. Natsumi and Miyuki later become irritated by his consistency. The officers suspect that Ken is Strike Man, much to his chagrin. Fortunately, Miyuki proves him to be innocent. Later, Strike Man stops a motorcyclist for avoiding railroad crossing regulations. Ken tries to catch up with him, but fails, so a plan is made to catch him. Ken disguises himself as Strike Man, which, in turn, lures in the real Strike Man. He and Natsumi duel with a baseball pitch--she defeats him, but he escapes and continues to act as a vigilante.
8	"Lucky Yoriko's Great Match"; Transliteration: "Rakkī Yoriko no Dai Shōbu!" (Japanese: ラッキー頼子の大勝負！)	November 23, 1996
Yoriko is challenged by Chie Sagamiono, her former classmate at the police academy, to a duel. Chie explains that Yoriko was the only one to graduate with a higher grade point average than her, much to everyone's surprise. Thus, she schedules the duel the following week. After a week of training of strength and stamina, the duel begins. The challenge is to issue as many traffic tickets as possible before sundown. Natsumi and Miyuki monitor Yoriko via webcam, noticing that she is more concerned with helping pedestrian crossing than traffic violations. At sundown, Chie boasts that she has given out many more tickets than Yoriko; but the next day, Yoriko receives a special service commendation award for her selfless acts. Chie is furious.
9	"Devious Love Triangle?"; Transliteration: "Koi no Meisō Toraianguru?" (Japanese: 恋の迷走トライアングル？)	November 30, 1996
Ken is seen talking to a girl at a local head shop, making the others suspect a love affair between the two. They overhear that he wants to meet the girl's father promptly, and guess that he wants permission from her father for her hand in marriage. Miyuki becomes overwhelmed by the possible thoughts. Natsumi and Miyuki later go to the mall to shop for clothes, eat food, and play arcade games to try to take their minds off Ken. Miyuki reminisces about helping Ken renovating his motorcycle, and falls into a depression. Natsumi and Miyuki later spots Ken and the girl riding on a motorcycle, forcing the two to chase after them. However, Yoriko and Aoi summon the two to help issue tickets on vehicles violating parking regulations. Afterwards, Ken shows up to bring Miyuki a tachometer as a birthday present, knowing that Miyuki was looking for one. He explains that the girl's father sells vintage car parts, and is confused about the "love affair" being talked about. Miyuki thanks him by making him bento for lunch the next day.
10	"The Totally Invincible 50 C.C. Old Lady!"; Transliteration: "Kanzen Muteki no Gentsuki Oba" (Japanese: 完全無敵の原付おばさん)	December 7, 1996
An elderly woman, known as the 50 C.C. Old Lady, contravenes every traffic law in order to go after discounts and sale events in various department stores. Meanwhile, a rash of motor scooter thefts keeps the traffic division busy. After Ken fails to catch her, the 50 C.C. Old Lady comes to the precinct in tears because her scooter has gone missing. She demands Natsumi and Miyuki drive her around to search for it. After many detours for stores and sales, they find a suspicious van that leads them to the stolen scooters--including the 50 C.C. Old Lady's! She manages to infiltrate the van and get back her scooter, continuing her habitual shopping sprees and traffic transgressions as usual.
11	"Santa Claus Panic!"; Transliteration: "Santa Kurōsu Panikku!" (Japanese: サンタクロース・パニック！)	December 14, 1996
The officers of the precinct are preparing for Christmas, an occasion of cheer and celebration. Miyuki knits a sweater for Ken, while, on the other hand, Ken makes reservations at a local restaurant for Miyuki. A man dressed as Santa Claus burgles the house of preschooler Maho, stealing all the jewelry and money her parents had. When Natsumi and Miyuki go out to find the burglar, they find Strike Man impersonating Santa Claus, much to their dismay. They later encounter the burglar, but lose sight of him in a crowd of men costumed as Santa Claus. Later, Strike Man finds the burglar littering, and punishes him for his actions. As Strike Man leaves, the burglar tries to escape, and Natsumi and Miyuki capture him. On Christmas Eve, Ken, dressed as Santa Claus, gives Maho a teddy bear as a present. Ken misses his restaurant reservations, but Miyuki gives him his sweater.
12	"I Want to be a Policewoman"; Transliteration: "Fujin Keikan ni Naritāi" (Japanese: 婦人警官になりたーい)	December 21, 1996
Saori Saga, a fickle teenager, is nearly run over by Osyo after trying to pick up her cellular phone she dropped in the middle of the road. She is taken back to Osyo's shrine, where she aspires to become a priestess. Natsumi and Miyuki arrive and take her to the train station, but she runs into trouble with two drunken men and accidentally slips off the platform. Natsumi pulls her away from an oncoming train, while Miyuki stops the men. She then wishes to become a police officer instead. Natsumi and Miyuki want Saori to realize that the reality of a police officer is not as glamorous as it seems. Saori later meets two confidence artists, imposing as a movie director and a camera operator, and chooses to go to an apartment room with them because she believes it could help an ongoing investigation. She discreetly contacts Osyo via cell phone, and he informs Natsumi and Miyuki of Saori's location. Although the men discover Saori's call, Natsumi and Miyuki reach her in time and catch them. Saori, although shaken, reiterates her desire to become a policewoman.
13	"Policewoman, Huge Trouble at the Onsen!"; Transliteration: "Fukei, Yukemuri Dai Sōdō!" (Japanese: 婦警、湯けむり大騒動！)	December 28, 1996
The officers take a trip to a rundown hot springs resort for the winter break. Two snowboarders on the slopes start harassing Yoriko and Aoi, until they are interrupted by Natsumi and Miyuki. After dinner, Natsumi, Miyuki, and Yoriko take a bath in the hot springs. The snowboarders attempt to spy on them, but are caught by Natsumi; later, they sneak into Aoi's room and attempt to sexually assault her before the other women catch them. Ken bursts in, telling them all the vacation money has been stolen. Natsumi and Miyuki follow the tracks of a snowmobile leading from the lodge using a tractor and, after some dangerous driving, are able to catch the burglar.
14	"Manjus are Scary! Natsumi's Edo Era Mission"; Transliteration: "Manjū Kowai! Natsumi no Dai Edo Daisakusen" (Japanese: 饅頭こわい！夏実の大江戸大作戦)	January 4, 1997
After seeing a set of manjū in the refrigerator, Natsumi devours them them. However, after another officer catches her, she slips and hits her head in surprise. She awakens in the Edo period, an era of Japanese history ruled by the shoguns of the Tokugawa family. Ken tells her that a murder has occurred near the riverbank and that Aoi witnessed it. Natsumi and Ken encounter Miyuki, a doctor giving a checkup to Osyo (depicted as Aoi's father) while Aoi tells them how she witnessed the murder. While going to Miyuki's house to pay off his debt, Osyo becomes the next victim of the assassin. Yoriko and Kachou suspect Miyuki, but when they go to her house, they too are attacked. The evidence of a maple leaf, a hot spring, a red-and-white cloth, and manjū leads Miyuki and Ken to later realize that Natsumi is the suspect. Being diagnosed with dissociative identity disorder and unaware of her alter ego, she awakens from the haunted nightmare, only to be scolded by the others for stealing all the manjū.
15	"Game! Chie Sagamiono's Rematch"; Transliteration: "Shōbu! Sagamiōno Chie Futatabi" (Japanese: 勝負！相模大野千恵ふたたび)	January 11, 1997
Chie, still jealous, challenges Yoriko yet again, proposing a paintball match. Yoriko asks Natsumi, Miyuki, and Aoi to be on her team. Meanwhile, two amateur thieves are seen driving away with stolen money, searching for a place to hide. At the Sagamiono estate, Yoriko and her seemingly inferior team are met with Chie and her hand-picked team of military women. Ironically, the two thieves unknowingly arrive at the estate as well, and mistake the paintball pistols as real handguns; they believe the women are actually killing each other. When Chie catches Yoriko, the thieves reveal themselves and plead for the killing to stop, but Yoriko accidentally shoots them and knocks them out. Chie defeats Yoriko in the game, but Yoriko receives another commendation for catching the two thieves.
16	"Mystery! Nakajima's Double"; Transliteration: "Nazo!? Futari no Nakajima" (Japanese: 謎！？ふたりの中嶋)	January 18, 1997
Natsumi and Miyuki encounter a motorcyclist wearing sunglasses resembling that of Ken. Gossips and rumors spread about Ken quitting the police department to become a professional racer. They cross paths with the motorcyclist a second time in a line of traffic. Ken is able to catch up to him, identifying him as Daimaru Nakajima, his father. Daimaru mistakes Natsumi for being Ken's girlfriend, much to Miyuki's shame. Later on, Natsumi tries to convince Miyuki to admit her feelings for Ken in front of Daimaru, only to turn out unsuccessful. Natsumi then tries to persuade her to show Daimaru her driving skills in her car. Coincidentally, another biker shows up to race against Daimaru. Daimaru is very impressed to see Miyuki tailing him, but loses his own concentration in the process and is injured. While Miyuki treats his wound, he ultimately decides to accept her relationship with Ken.
17	"The 20-year-old Girl is His Mother"; Transliteration: "Nijū-sai no Ano Musume wa Okā-san" (Japanese: ２０才のあの娘はお母さん)	January 25, 1997
At Ken's house, Natsumi and Miyuki are welcomed by Sena Wakabayashi, a 20-year-old woman who explains that she will soon be Ken's stepmother. After Sena drives Ken to the precinct, gossips and rumors spread concerning his relationship with her. Sena later comes back to deliver lunch to Ken, causing further embarrassment. Natsumi and Miyuki offer for Sena to spend the night at their house. Sena recalls falling in love with Daimaru when she first encountered him driving on a mountain pass. Miyuki suggests Sena takes Ken on a shopping spree to bond with him, but Ken, embarrassed, will only refer to her as a little sister. But when she is hurt by two men who steal her car, Ken finally calls her "mom" and accepts her new role in his life.
18	"The Search and Kill Mission! The Strike Girls Party"; Transliteration: "Yūgeki! Sutoraiku Shōjo Tai" (Japanese: 遊撃！ストライク少女隊)	February 1, 1997
Strike Man recruits three schoolgirls (one of whom is Yasuyo Yamada, the class president) in his Strike Youth Brigade. These girls, masked and disguised, attack three troublesome boys from their elementary school in vigilante justice. Natsumi and Miyuki suspect Strike Man is behind these attacks. They find another troublemaking boy, Yukiharu Akimoto, and use him as bait to find the girls. When confronted, they guiltily unmask themselves. Yukiharu runs into a demolished building to escape the fury of the girls, and mocks them from the roof--but then the building begins to collapse and he's left dangling from a ladder. Natsumi, Miyuki, and Yasuyo venture inside to save him, despite the building's ongoing collapse. Yasuyo is the one to rescue him, and then both children are saved by Miyuki and Natsumi despite the troublesome appearance of Strike Man.
19	"Fragments of a Dream, A Legendary Tuner"; Transliteration: "Yume no Kakera, Densetsu no Chūnā" (Japanese: 夢のかけら、伝説のチューナー)	February 8, 1997
Natsumi's motorcycle breaks down, forcing her to search for a motorcycle repair shop in the city. She meets an elderly mechanic, who leaves her with tools to fix the motorcycle on her own. The mechanic guides Natsumi in fixing the clutch cable connection, as well as checking the brake hydraulic fluid level, lubricating the chain drive, and changing the engine oil. Natsumi later introduces the mechanic to Miyuki, who is familiar with the mechanic's history, and Daimaru, who remembers him--they worked together until a motorcycle accident ten years ago. Natsumi, saying they shouldn't dwell on the past, breaks out the old motorcycle for a test drive to try and break the speed-test time.
20	"Fight! Traffic Squadron OBI Three"; Transliteration: "Tatakae! Kōtsū Sentai ŌBI Surī" (Japanese: 戦え！交通戦隊オービスリー)	February 15, 1997
Yoriko directs a play educating the preschoolers about traffic safety. Ken plays a traffic-rule-breaking monster, Miyuki an innocent schoolgirl, and Natsumi, Yoriko, and Aoi superheroes. A brotherhood of ninjas also see the flyer and decide to attend. The play is not very good, and so the ninjas alter the superhero costumes with remote-controlled smoke bombs to make the play more exciting. They stage a takeover of the play, trapping the preschoolers--who play along--and forcing Ken to attack Natsumi, Yoriko and Aoi as they set off the smoke bombs. Miyuki sends a signal to block the frequency of the smoke bombs, and the superheroes defeat Ken and the ninjas. The spectacle convinces the preschoolers to obey traffic laws.
21	"A Bank Robbery Evaluation Manual"; Transliteration: "Ginkō Gōtō Taisaku Manyuaru" (Japanese: 銀行強盗対策マニュアル)	February 22, 1997
Miyuki and Natsumi are asked to try to rob a local bank as part of a special training exercise. Although it's merely a drill issued by Arizuka, the policewomen take it seriously: they hack the video feed, jam cell phone frequencies, and crack the combination lock on the vault before escaping underground. The police chase them into the sewers, but Natsumi and Miyuki are able to escape in their police car hidden there. Bokuto Station celebrates as Natsumi and Miyuki return to them, chased by the rest of the police.
22	"Yoriko Nikaidou's Day Off"; Transliteration: "Nikaidō Yoriko no Kyūjitsu" (Japanese: 二階堂頼子の休日)	March 1, 1997
Kachou informs the precinct that a Middle Eastern prince fled from a coup d'état of his country and is now in exile in Tokyo. This is also Yoriko's day off from work. She unknowingly encounters the prince, who is not well suited for city life. The two end up relaxing at a park together. The prince tells her she's altruistic, and she says it's part of her job as a police officer. The prince asks Yoriko to take him to shrine to pray concerning the coup--after the prince explains his exile in Tokyo, Yoriko encourages him to return to his kingdom, only belatedly realizing who he is. Before he leaves, the chief asks Yoriko to see him one last time before he departs.
23	"The Flower that Blooms on a Virgin Road"; Transliteration: "Vājin Rōdo ni Hana ga Saku" (Japanese: ヴァージンロードに花が咲く)	March 8, 1997
The precinct prepares for Daimaru and Sena's wedding. At the Nakajima motorcycle repair shop, everyone is making decorations and festivities for the wedding. The question of Miyuki and Ken's own relationship arises, creating tension between the two. Everyone arrives at the wedding ceremony, including Daimaru's motorcycle gang and Sena's race car. The motorcycle priest announces a traditional race of the motorcyclists with the prize a kiss from the bridge, however Miyuki as a police officer convinces him to make the race snail-paced. Ken wins, but Natsumi arranges so that the kiss secretly comes from Miyuki and not from Sena. The wedding ceremony is performed and the honeymoon is underway.
24	"Aoi-chan has a White Rose"; Transliteration: "Aoi-chan wa Shiroi Bara" (Japanese: 葵ちゃんは白い薔薇)	March 15, 1997
A famous actor comes by the precinct to act as chief for the day, and requests Aoi as assistant and bodyguard. At the autograph booth, the actor is met by a long line of female fans to sign flyers for his upcoming movie. As Aoi later retrieves more flyers from the storage room, two envious fans attack her. The actor saves her just in time, leaving both flustered and blushing. After the rest of the officers leave, Aoi and the actor recall their first meeting in a garden of white and red roses, and the actor asks for Aoi's hand in marriage. Aoi struggles to answer him. When she arrives at the actor's party, it's in a tuxedo instead of a dress; outside, in the garden, she tells him that she is trans. In an interview the next day, the actor talks about his time at the precinct and the white rose he wears as a symbol of respect, saying that it's a symbol of a person very special to him.
25	"Run Strike Man Run"; Transliteration: "Sutoraiku Otoko Hashiru Hashiru" (Japanese: ストライク男走る走る)	March 22, 1997
Strike Man encounters a woman running from a drunk man. He defeats the man, but the woman stops Strike Man from punishing him further; the real criminals, she says, are the people of a nearby loan office her father borrowed from. The police figure out that the couple are duping Strike Man to rob the loan office. When Strike Man storms into the loan center, Yoriko, impersonating a desk clerk, gives Strike Man three suitcases seemingly full of cash, with transmitters in all of them. Miyuki and Natsumi, along with Yoriko and Aoi, follow the couple to their hideout, with Strike Man chasing after them. They arrange for Strike Man to clumsily break into the couple's hideout and discover he was used in their scheme. The couple is then arrested for aiding and abetting in robbery.
26	"A Dangerous Knife in a Red Dress"; Transliteration: "Akai Doresu ni Kiken na Naifu" (Japanese: 赤いドレスに危険なナイフ)	April 5, 1997
Inspector Tokuno explains that a maniacal criminal is seen at aristocratic parties, slashing red dresses worn by women with his knife. In order to go undercover Ken and Aoi, who is to wear the red dress, must pose as a couple at a party held on a yacht. Natsumi and Kachou come to the party a couple as well, while Miyuki and Yoriko are disguised as waitresses. Ken and Aoi dance to blend in with the crowd. A man appearing to be he criminal soon manages to find Aoi, attempting to molest her. As Natsumi and Miyuki come looking for her, Aoi copes to shake him off. After the said criminal has been caught, Miyuki and Aoi exchange outfit, giving Ken the chance to be with Miyuki. When the actual criminal shows up, Natsumi, tries to attack him, only to be sprayed by sleeping gas. Ken, who has also been sprayed, intervenes and restricts the criminal from harming Miyuki. When the criminal almost stabs Ken, Tokuno arrives and defeats the criminal.
27	"The ABC Driving Lesson"; Transliteration: "Kyōshūjo Ressun Ei Bī Shī" (Japanese: 教習所レッスンABC)	April 12, 1997
Natsumi is to take driver's education to obtain her driver's license. However, it is recognized that her colleagues are gambling to see whether or not Natsumi will pass the driving test. As a crowd of people witness her test, Miyuki and Yoriko, even Kachou, come to check up on her. It is seen that the father and son, the manager and teacher of the school respectively, plan to prevent Natsumi from getting her driver's license, after seeing her reckless driving firsthand. To the shock of the precinct, Natsumi has attained her learner's permit. The father customizes the car with resistance, making it more difficult for Natsumi to drive. When a truck driver violates traffic regulations, Natsumi is able to withstand the restriction of the car, allowing her to drive reckless. The father, realizing that she is a police officer, is impressed by her driving skills. The truck driver is eventually arrested, with the assistance of Miyuki and Yoriko. Natsumi receives her driver's license, much to everyone's surprise.
28	"Chase Down Imposter No. 704"; Transliteration: "Kaitō Nanahyakuyon-gō o Oi Tsumero" (Japanese: 怪盗７０４号を追いつめろ)	April 19, 1997
The precinct is assigned to visit some of the senior citizens in the community, in order to be on a lookout for a thief who robs the elderly. Yoriko and Aoi meets an old man, while Ken is greeted by an old woman. Natsumi is dropped off by Miyuki at another elderly woman's house, unaware that the thief has already infiltrated the house. The thief disguises himself, voice and appearance, as the elderly woman. He desperately tried to get rid of her, making up fibs and excuses. Miyuki later comes, causing more tension for the thief. To make matters worse, Ken delivers a chest of drawers to the house, since his assigned woman wanted to return it. After the actual elderly woman returns to her home, Miyuki and Natsumi catch the thief.
29	"The Appearance of a Rival - The Race at Dawn"; Transliteration: "Raibaru Shutsugen - Akatsuki no Rēsu" (Japanese: ライバル出現・暁のレース)	April 26, 1997
Sena begins scheming on how to get Miyuki and Ken together. Sena's cousin, Yuichi, come to visit at her motorcycle repair shop. Yuichi happens to be a famous motorcycle racer. Miyuki becomes flustered when Sena compares Yuichi to Ken. Yuichi gives Miyuki a paddock pass for his upcoming race. After a victorious race, Yuichi shows Miyuki his motorcycle in the paddock, which raises envy for Ken. Yuichi later challenges Ken to a race with Miyuki as collateral. It is revealed that Sena devised a scheme to get Ken to admit his feelings to Miyuki. As the race with Ken versus Yuichi commences, Miyuki hangs in the balance. After a neck and neck race, Yuichi admits defeat and wishes Ken good luck with Miyuki.
30	"Dear Riko-chan Forever"; Transliteration: "Itoshi no Riko-chan yo Eien ni" (Japanese: いとしのリコちゃんよ永遠に)	May 3, 1997
Natsumi and Miyuki travel to a shopping mall in order to go shopping for apparel. Gossips and rumors began to flourish within the mall, concerned of a possible bomb threat. The customers and employees are advised to evacuate the mall, however Natsumi and Miyuki are uninformed. Tokuno briefs them about the bomb threat. The bomber contacts the mall, creating a game of riddles. Natsumi and Miyuki fray to find the first clue, known as Rico. Everyone eventually figures out that Rico is a former doll that appears on the clock tower. They find the bomb attached to Rico, supposedly able to diffuse it. After another call from the bomber, hinting of a massive bomb, Natsumi, Miyuki, and even Tokuno manage to find his whereabouts and catch him. After interrogating him, they soon realize that the new bomb is planted in the middle of the clock tower dolls. Natsumi and Miyuki race to the roof, where they are to pry open the clock face from the outside in order to get to the bomb. When the hour is struck, Natsumi strains to prevent the other dolls from setting off the bomb, while Miyuki attempt to successfully diffuse it.
31	"A Duel at Minus 40 Degrees"; Transliteration: "Mainasu Yonjū Do no Kettō" (Japanese: マイナス４０度の決闘)	May 10, 1997
News broadcasting reports that a biopharmaceutical laboratory has been robbed. Saori, still determined to be a police officer, tells a group of preschoolers to return lost and found items within a shopping mall, diverting it into a game. Upon finding a briefcase in a telephone booth, she gives it to Natsumi and Miyuki for safe keeping. Unfortunately, she is caught by a crook, who is looking for the briefcase, in a nearby park. When Saori disappears, the preschoolers take notice of her handbag she supposedly left behind, as they decide to take that to Natsumi and Miyuki. Saori calls the precinct, to meet her at a warehouse. As the preschoolers deliver the handbag to Natsumi and Miyuki, the two search meet Saori outside the warehouse. The crook and his gang surround the three, revealing that the briefcase contains bacteria stolen from the biopharmaceutical laboratory. Tokuno later arrives to arrest the gang, thanking Natsumi, Miyuki, and Saori for a job well done.
32	"Takeoff! Natsumi's Super Machine"; Transliteration: "Hasshin! Natsumi no Sūpā Mashin" (Japanese: 発進！夏実のスーパーマシン)	May 17, 1997
Natsumi finds herself without wheels after she wrecks her motorcycle. She considers buying a car, much to everyone's dismay. After Natsumi purchases her car, Miyuki realizes how schlock it really is. Meanwhile, Aoi tells Yoriko that she has been set up by a blind date, thanks to her neighbor. Natsumi, feeling depressed, becomes blindsided by the fact that the car salesperson was a fraud. Miyuki does her best to modify the rundown car, customizing it to Natsumi's needs. Miyuki unveils the revamped car to Natsumi, recognizing the hybrid features with that of a motorcycle. Natsumi and Miyuki track down the pseudo salesperson, as he tries to escape. The two catch up with him after he crashes on the bridge. Moreover, Aoi finds out that her blind date is also a con man.
33	"Kya! An Idol Encircling Web"; Transliteration: "Kya! Aidoru Hōi Mō" (Japanese: キャ〜！ アイドル包囲網)	May 24, 1997
Toki, a celebrity idol, has violated parking regulations, putting Natsumi and Miyuki ill at ease. When he disregards traffic laws, this raises suspicion. It is later found out that his driving infringement records were all deleted. A traffic safety campaign is to be held near the precinct, and will be advertised by Toki. So Natsumi, Miyuki, and Ken devise a plan to exploit Toki for breaking traffic rules. The three chase Toki toward the precinct, where he is unaware that the media and press arrived early.
34	"Day-off at 250 Meters Above Ground"; Transliteration: "Chijō Nihyakugojū Mētoru no Kyūka" (Japanese: 地上２５０メートルの休暇)	May 31, 1997
Strong winds have been reported for the forecast throughout the Tokyo area. The observation deck of the Tokyo Tower has been closed due to the strong winds approaching. Natsumi, Miyuki, Yoriko, and Aoi way their way back toward the tower on a helicopter. Kachou spots a boy who is the president of his investigation club. A thief steals a bag of valuable items, including that of a woman's purse. The thief demands for a key to the stairs leading to the upper deck of the tower. Once outside, the thief is overpowered by the strong winds, blowing away the bag of stolen items. Kachou cautiously attempts to save the thief from falling over the handrails. As the boy walks outside, Kachou grabs him, injuring his ankle in the process, before the strong winds whoosh and jam the door. The precinct is contacted to send a rescue team to retrieve Kachou and the boy, aside from the fact that it is out of their jurisdiction.
35	"Friendship at 250 Meters Above Ground"; Transliteration: "Chijō Nihyakugojū Mētoru no Yūjō" (Japanese: 地上２５０メートルの友情)	June 7, 1997
Tokuno orchestrates a daring rescue mission for the precinct to retrieve Kachou and the boy. Meanwhile, Kachou explains to the boy that the construction of the Tokyo Tower is made from American military tanks used in the Korean War. The boy confesses that he is the only member of his investigation club, mentioning his poor social life. The precinct was planning to use the tower elevator to reach Kachou and the boy, but it turns out that the elevator is broken. Ken, atop the Shiba Zōjō-ji Temple, spots Kachou and the boy nearly falling over the handrails of the tower. A rescue specialist, requested by Tokuno, along with Natsumi travel up the stairs of the tower, carrying a blowtorch. Upon reaching the stairs that lead to the upper deck, the rescue specialist uses the blowtorch to open the jammed door. Natsumi is to use a kernmantle rope, for resistance against the strong winds, to get to Kachou and the boy. The rescue specialist pulls the three into the observation deck, and Miyuki is able to fix the elevator.
36	"The Kitten who Became a Missing Child"; Transliteration: "Maigo ni Natta Koneko-chan" (Japanese: 迷子になった子猫ちゃん)	June 14, 1997
The preschoolers lose sight of Maho's cat. Strike Man comes by back in action and offers to help find the cat. While Ken and the preschoolers search for the cat within the playground, Strike Man gives Natsumi and Miyuki an assortment of cats, telling that he will go look for the actual cat on his own. Miyuki installs tracking devices on stray cats, while Natsumi and Ken observe the area of the feline territories. After the preschoolers take a break buying food and toys, Natsumi, Miyuki, and Ken send them home. On their way back, the Maho find the cat at a wooden dock along the riverbank on a boat. However, the boat begins to drift away, heading towards a pillar of a nearby bridge. Ken races to the top of the bridge in order to dive into the river to recover Maho and the cat.
37	"Super-Express Yamanote Line Incident"; Transliteration: "Tokkyū Yamanotesen Jiken" (Japanese: 特急山手線事件)	June 21, 1997
A pair of pickpockets are seen snagging valuable items from young women at a train station. Yoriko and Aoi have been dispatched to bring the pickpockets in, while Natsumi and Miyuki are to act as backup. Unfortunately, Aoi becomes more occupied with arresting perverts and molesters. The pickpockets spot a business group with a briefcase boarding a train. They manage to steal the briefcase, however Yoriko and Aoi witness them escaping. The two follow them to another train, as it is revealed that two pistols were encased in the briefcase. The pickpockets use Yoriko's police badge, for which was dropped, in order to hijack the train, taking the conductor captive. Meanwhile, Natsumi and Miyuki hitchhikes aboard another train in an attempt to catch up to the hijacked train side by side. Aoi bypasses the pickpockets to open the passenger door, allowing Natsumi to jump across and defeat the pickpockets.
38	"This Man is, Senior Police Officer Shouji"; Transliteration: "Sono Otoko, Shōji Masashi" (Japanese: その男、東海林将司)	June 28, 1997
The rescue specialist and lieutenant Shouji Toukairin has joined the Bokuto Police Precinct as its newest recruit. Natsumi is flabbergasted to see that only sandwiches and salads are left on the menu, and offers an arm wrestling match to Shouji for his food as collateral. Upon losing the match, Natsumi plans to uphold her reputation as the strongest officer of the precinct. Shouji host an undergoing training session specializing in rescue missions, however Natsumi is dissatisfied by common procedures. In a dangerous simulation, in which a bus is piled on top of a car, Shouji saves Natsumi from being crushed by the bus.
39	"Ah! The Beach Volley Man of Youth"; Transliteration: "Aa! Seishun no Bīchi Barē Otoko" (Japanese: 嗚呼！青春のビーチバレー男)	July 5, 1997
Natsumi and Miyuki are running late to board the train to the beach. They are to meet with Ken, Yoriko, and Aoi, however the two are temporarily interfered by Strike Man. At the beach, Natsumi, Miyuki, Yoriko, and Aoi encounters Strike Man, calling himself Beach Volleyball Man. Yoriko enters Natsumi and Miyuki, as well as Ken and Strikeman, in a volleyball tournament, as a vacation in Hawaii for a week becomes the prize. The two teams climb their way up the tournament, winning successive matches. In the final showdown, Natsumi and Miyuki ultimatrly wins against Ken and Strikeman.
40	"Dangerous Date 2x3" Transliteration: "Kiken na Dēto Tsū Ekkusu Surī" (Japanese: 危険なデート２×３)	July 12, 1997
Yoriko invites Ken to an amusement park, telling him that Miyuki is already planning to go as well. Yoriko also invites Natsumi, Aoi, and Kachou, hinting that Miyuki and Ken would be going as a date. Miyuki and Ken eventually realize that the four have been spying on them. While the six of them enjoy lunchtime, Kachou interests them to a paintball monster hunt. Their goal is to advance and destroy the base of the monsters. They temporarily split up, each defeating a few monsters along the way. When the six regroup, the monsters reassemble together. They shoot down Yoriko, Aoi, and Kachou, leaving Natsumi, Miyuki, and Ken to head toward the base. One of the monsters takes down Ken, making Natsumi and Miyuki the only ones left. The two manage to finish off the last monster and destroy the goal, thereby completing the monster hunt.
41	"Turn! The Rotating Lights of Fire (Part One)"; Transliteration: "Maware! Honō no Kaiten-tō (Zenpen)" (Japanese: 廻れ！炎の回転灯【前編】)	July 19, 1997
Three rogue cops strategically, yet chaotically, ram into defenseless citizens driving. Tokuno and Kachou inform the precinct of the situation, calling them in for duty. However, it is realized that the public blames the precinct for these shortcomings, almost ruining their reputation. Arizuka pays a visit, ordering the precinct to be grounded from patrol for a week. He also mentions that the rogue cops must be caught within the week. Yoriko and Aoi glimpse the rogue cops trailing a victimized car entering a shopping district, reporting to the precinct. Natsumi and Miyuki follow the rogue cops, disobeying orders. Ken is able to intersect and spare the victimized car. The radio transmission to the precinct has been cut off, hinting that the rogue cops are those within the headquarters. After later being backed up by the rogue cops, Ken injures his leg, and is admitted to a hospital.
42	"Turn! The Rotating Lights of Fire (Part Two)"; Transliteration: "Maware! Honō no Kaiten-tō (Kōhen)" (Japanese: 廻れ！炎の回転灯【後編】)	July 26, 1997
The precinct complains about being grounded from patrol. Kachou and Kachou summon Miyuki to confidentially hack into the headquarters database in order to find the files of the rogue cops. Meanwhile, Natsumi goes off on her own to search for the rogue cops. It is reported that Ken has left the hospital. After being closed in by the rogue cops, Natsumi breaks her wrist and dislocates her shoulder, and is provisionally sent to the hospital. Kachou negotiates with Arizuka to orchestrate two hundred fifty police cars to trap the rogue cops on a metropolitan highway, blocking each and every highway ramp. Natsumi and Ken, aside from their minor afflictions, are being chased by the rogue cops. Miyuki, on the other hand, is chasing after the rogue cops. The three police officers lead to three rogue cops to a nearby bridge. With teamwork and determination, the three police officers manage to immobilize the three rogue cops one by one.
43	"Bokuto Station Scandal"; Transliteration: "Bokutō-sho Sukyandaru" (Japanese: 墨東署スキャンダル)	August 2, 1997
The precinct has the feeling that a voyeur is spying on the station. Meanwhile, Tokuno is given a case dealing with an unknown bank robber. An uproar flourishes in the precinct after a series of embarrassing pictures are posted on the internet. The culprits, being three kids operating a radio-controlled helicopter, are revealed. The bank robber is seen in one of the embarrassing pictures of Ken, therefore the time of the robbery is apparent. The radio-controlled helicopter has been spotted due to the lack of stealth, and the kids' hideout has been located due to the tracking device installed. The bank robber appears at the hideout, demanding to have the picture taken of him. However, he evades as Natsumi and Miyuki arrives. The two follow the bank robber, with the help of the periodic pictures taken by the kids' radio-controlled helicopter. Tokuno and Shouji intersect and takes down the bank robber.
44	"One-hundred Bokuto Tales"; Transliteration: "Bokutō Hyaku Monogatari" (Japanese: 墨東百物語)	August 9, 1997
Ken convinces the precinct to go on a ghost hunt, after he traumatically beheld a silhouetted figure whooshing outside of the window of the restroom the previous night. Kachou narrates legends about the ghosts that haunt the station. An old man vanishes to a cemetery after asking directions from a police officer in a downpour and dark night. A dummy of a young boy, used to demonstrate accident scenarios, screamed words of pain and suffering. An officer's voice haunts the station phone at night, after being stabbed with a knife and collapsed while crawling to a telephone booth. A water well found outside the home of a peddler is told to be lurking with spirits. After travelling through the gallows on his way back home, he is stopped by another peddler who offers him two watermelons for his journey home. After endlessly consuming one of the watermelons, he fetches for the other watermelon in the water well, where the spirits reside. It is later recognized that Shouji was training outside nightly, as he was the silhouetted figure seen.
45	"Days of Summer...The Twilight of Two People"; Transliteration: "Natsu no Nichi...Yūgure no Futari" (Japanese: 夏の日…夕暮れのふたり)	August 16, 1997
Natsumi and Miyuki meet up with Shouji at Osyo's shrine. The three of them are sent on an errand to the country to deliver a special package to Osyo's mother, later unveiling to be a special scroll. The mother offers the three to stay for lunchtime. While Miyuki stays to help the mother clean and prepare the kitchen, Natsumi and Shouji go out to shop for groceries. However, Shouji shows Natsumi to a tombstone near a shoreline, reminiscing about a friend he once knew who hiked with him in the mountains. It begins to rain after get some fruits and vegetables from a peddler. Sheltered yet stranded, the two share a bonding moment. Natsumi, Miyuki, and Shouji enjoy a nice dinner with the mother. The three make their trip back to the precinct.
46	"Shouji's Struggles"; Transliteration: "Shōji Funtōsu!" (Japanese: 東海林奮闘す！)	August 23, 1997
One of three male students, after being defeated by a female student during kendo class, throws his shinai in the field near the station, where Shouji happens to be. Shouji tells the male student to claim the shinai by way of a duel the following day. The male student ask Shouji to teach them kendo, after witnessing his skill and talent. Meanwhile, Natsumi and Miyuki are all preparing for a traffic safety class that is soon awaiting them. They soon realize that the male student has a crush on the female student. Natsumi tells the male students to invite the kendo class to attend traffic safety class. Shouji watches a match between the male student and the female student, finally noticing a gain in focus and determination from the male student.
47	"Time Limit"; Transliteration: "Taimu Rimitto" (Japanese: タイム・リミット)	August 30, 1997
Natsumi and Shouji make plans to go rock climbing. The precinct is now aware of their relationship, gravely concerned of the two. Shouji struggles as he tries to admit his feelings toward Natsumi. while Natsumi fails to understand his emotions. A horrible accident occurs at a tunnel on the highway, dispatching Ken, Yoriko, and Aoi to regulate the traffic flow. Natsumi and Miyuki are asked by Shouji to be taken to the scene of the accident, recovering drivers and passengers in various vehicles that were impacted. A young boy is trapped in a car, urging Natsumi and Shouji to rescue him. Together, they dislodge a van piled on top of the car, thereby safely obtaining the boy.
48	"The End of Summer"; Transliteration: "Natsu no Owari" (Japanese: 夏の終わり)	September 6, 1997
The precinct plans to throw a farewell party for Shouji. While Shouji has already arrived at the station, however Natsumi has yet to show up. Natsumi goes back to the tombstone of Shouji's friend, trying to hide her feelings of depression. She later walks in on a kendo match between Kachou and Shouji, much to her surprise. Natsumi and Shouji enjoy their last time together at a park bench in the evening, gulping down many cans of beer. After making hot tea for everyone at the precinct, Natsumi asks permission for personal time off from work. She races to the airport just in time to see Shouji off, sharing their first kiss together.
49	"Bokuto Station Crime Investigation: Kaoruko Kinoshita's Arrival"; Transliteration: "Bokutō-sho Sōsa-sen: Kinoshita Kaoruko Chakunin" (Japanese: 墨東署捜査線 木下かおる子着任)	September 13, 1997
The precinct is meeting with Kaoruko Kinoshita, the assistant inspector of the headquarters. She discusses creating an investigation team within the precinct in order to catch the perpetrators responsible for luxury cars thefts. Miyuki is to be in charge of the headquarters mainframe database, while Natsumi is partnered with Kinoshita for the time being. Kachou learns that Arizuka enlisted Kinoshita to direct the investigation. A white van has been reported at the scene of the crime. As the white van has been found, many police officers are to set up barricades in various streets. When Natsumi and Kinoshita initiate a trap, the white van escapes by driving down the terrain. Kinoshita invites Natsumi to be a part of the headquarters, recognizing her great partnership skills.
50	"Bokuto Station Crime Investigation: Respective Tomorrows"; Transliteration: "Bokutō-sho Sōsa-sen: Sorezore no Ashita" (Japanese: 墨東署捜査線 それぞれの明日)	September 20, 1997
Natsumi is currently working at the headquarters to continue to investigate the luxury car thefts. Miyuki chases a stolen luxury car, ultimately resulting in a burnout. Miyuki and Ken talk via two-way radio, concerning the current damage and possible repair of her police car, analogizing that with her life situation. However, everyone in the precinct scolds Ken for what he has said to Miyuki, much to his chagrin. Strike Man is seen carrying a luxury car on a forklift, proclaiming to prevent more thefts from happening. Miyuki challenges Strike Man to a duel, prompting her victory. Miyuki, compensating by impersonating Natsumi, catches attention on the precinct. She later realizes that Ken was lifting her up, not putting her down, in finding herself. Natsumi returns to the station in order to be partnered with Miyuki once more.
51	"Bokuto Station Crime Investigation: Best Partner"; Transliteration: "Bokutō-sho Sōsa-sen: Besuto Pātonā" (Japanese: 墨東署捜査線 ベスト・パートナー)	September 27, 1997
It is resourced that the perpetrators are hiding out in a used car parking lot. The perpetrators leave early in the morning, with a few luxury cars along with a semi-trailer truck. Kinoshita orders all police cars to detain the perpetrators on a metropolitan expressway toward the bay shore, blocking each and every slip road. Aoi is shot by one of the perpetrators, who purposely had swaggered and halted his car. It is seen that the perpetrators switched to another semi-trailer truck to haul the luxury cars. Natsumi, Miyuki, and Ken continue onto the expressway, arranging new orders. Ken collides with another one of the perpetrators, who attempted to shoot him on the spot. After a car is released from the semi-trailer truck, Natsumi and Miyuki make their way in, infiltrating the truck and ceasing the perpetrators.

=== Theme songs ===
- Openings
1. "In Order to be Me" (僕であるために, Boku de Aru Tame ni)
  - November 2, 1996 - March 22, 1997
  - Lyricist: Takashi Hamasaki / Composer: FLYING KIDS / Arranger: FLYING KIDS / Singers: FLYING KIDS
  - FILE.5-25
2. "LOVE SOMEBODY"
  - April 5, 1997 - September 27, 1997
  - Lyricist: Takeshi Yokoyama / Composer: H^L / Arranger: H^L / Singers: Mariko Fukui
  - FILE.26-51
- Endings
1. "Thank you, love"
  - November 2, 1996 - March 22, 1997
  - Lyricist: Keiko Terada / Composer: Shinji Kakijima / Arranger: Itaru Watanabe / Singers: Keiko Terada
  - FILE.5-25
2. "Look up at the Sky" (空を見上げて, Sora o Miagete)
  - April 5, 1997 - September 27, 1997
  - Lyricist: Takako Shirai / Composer: Takako Shirai / Arranger: Takako Shirai & River of Dreams / Singers: Takako Shirai
  - FILE.26-51

== TV specials ==
No.	Title	Original release date
1.1	"Don't Tear Up the Tickets!"; Transliteration: "Ihankippu wa Yaburanai de!" (Japanese: 違反切符は破らないで！)	March 29, 1999
To teach Yoko, the spoiled daughter of a wealthy man, a lesson for disobeying traffic rules. Miyuki ruins her car and Natsumi 'fixes' her dress causing her to be left half naked and stranded in the middle of a busy street.
1.2	"The Final Driver Safety Workshop"; Transliteration: "Kippari to Kōtsū Anzen Kōshūkai" (Japanese: きっぱりと交通安全講習会)	March 30, 1999
Miyuki and Natsumi take responsibility of a motorcycle driving class to a group of reckless and horny teenagers.
1.3	"Dash into Fire"; Transliteration: "Ton de Hi ni Iru" (Japanese: とんで火にいる)	March 31, 1999
A pervert enters Miyuki and Natsumi's apartment in order to steal their lingerie. Natsumi decides to capture him right in spot.
1.4	"Lifeguard - Mouth to Mouth"; Transliteration: "Nōsatsu - Mausu to Mausu" (Japanese: 悩殺・マウスｔｏマウス)	April 1, 1999
A thief is stealing the intimate clothes out of the women's locker room when Aoi, Miyuki, Natsumi and Yoriko are teaching a swimming safety class in the pool.
2.1	"Silky Panty Collector"; Transliteration: "Shirukī Panti Korekutā" (Japanese: シルキー・パンティ・コレクター)	April 5, 1999
Trying to sew a blanket made of silk women underpants, a burglar steals Aoi and Yoriko's and many other women clothes. With a bait and a booby trap Miyuki and Natsumi try to catch him.
2.2	"Catch the Angel"; Transliteration: "Tenshi o Tsukamaero" (Japanese: 天使をつかまえろ)	April 6, 1999
A young man with a wild crush on both Miyuki and Natsumi gets himself into trouble constantly in order to see them and ultimately getting a grab of them, literally.
2.3	"Horror Night"; Transliteration: "Horā Naito" (Japanese: ホラーナイト)	April 7, 1999
A criminal begins assaulting young women in a park dressed as a fearful ghost. Kachou assigns the pair the task of arresting him much to Kobayakawa's dismay, who is terribly afraid of the supernatural.
2.4	"Attracted to Danger"; Transliteration: "Kiwadoi no ga Osuki" (Japanese: きわどいのがお好き)	April 8, 1999
A man peeks into the Bokuto station women's dressing room using a cat with a camera hidden on a collar, trying to take nude photos of the officers.
3.1	"Let Me Look Into Your Eyes"; Transliteration: "Mitsumete Agetai" (Japanese: 見つめてあげたい)	April 13, 1999
A Peeping Tom is spying into a gym ladies restroom using a hidden camera. The main pair try to stop him with Nakajima's help.
3.2	"Tune-up Restaurant"; Transliteration: "Chūn-appu Resutoran" (Japanese: チューンナップレストラン)	April 14, 1999
When the Bokuto station's cafeteria starts losing its clients to a restaurant served by pretty women. Miyuki and Natsumi volunteer as lightly dressed waitresses to recover them.
3.3	"The Splendid Battle"; Transliteration: "Karei Naru Taiketsu" (Japanese: 華麗なる対決)	April 15, 1999
A street acrobat causes traffic trouble with the crowd he attract. Kobayakawa and Tsujimoto try to arrest him, but end up joining his circus acts instead.
3.4	"Fighting Shoulder Bag"; Transliteration: "Tatakau Shorudā Baggu" (Japanese: 戦うショルダーバッグ)	Unaired
When a pickpocket takes Kobayakawa's purse, he doesn't know all the high-tech traps it contains and tortures him.
4.1	"Ten Thousand Yen from the Heavens"; Transliteration: "Tengoku ga Kureta Ichi Man-en" (Japanese: 天国がくれた一万円)	April 19, 1999
Trying to recover Ten Thousand Yen that flew from her hand. Tsujimoto stumbles upon a suicidal man who is about to jump from her apartment building roof because of a Mahjong debt.
4.2	"Mystery! The Naked Woman in the Tunnel"; Transliteration: "Kaiki! Rajo ga Tadayō Tonneru" (Japanese: 怪奇！裸女が漂うトンネル)	April 20, 1999
A local tunnel is known by the legend of a naked ghost woman that haunts the drivers who passes by. As the spectre looks very similar to Aoi. Natsumi sends her dressed as the apparition to scare the drivers away with her thing in order to end the traffic jams the legend causes, but a scary surprise is waiting for the officers once they get to the tunnel.
4.3	"Held By Concrete"; Transliteration: "Konkurīto de Dakishimete" (Japanese: コンクリートで抱きしめて)	April 21, 1999
When three thugs aboard a Mercedes-Benz cause trouble to Takako, a young traffic officer, the main pair decide to teach them a lesson by luring them into a pit that will be covered in concrete soon.
4.4	"A Spring Night's Dream"; Transliteration: "Haru no Yoru no Yume" (Japanese: 春の夜の夢)	April 22, 1999
During the Station's Hanami, all the officers, including Kachou and of course Natsumi, get dead drunk and find themselves unable to pay for a pizza delivery when they realize that all of their purses and wallets are gone.
5.1	"Convenience Panic"; Transliteration: "Konbini Panikku" (Japanese: コンビニパニック)	April 26, 1999
A thief armed with a sharp knife attempts to rob a Bokuto convenience store when Aoi and Yoriko are there buying their lunch, he takes a little girl and a 9 month pregnant woman as hostages. Kobayakawa and Tsujimoto arrive to the same store by coincidence, and the situation grows even more tense when the woman apparently goes into labour and Yoriko breaks her leg. However, they stage those incidents to make the criminal surrender himself as Kobayakawa warns him about being charged of involuntary manslaughter.
5.2	"Flame's Silver Chase"; Transliteration: "Honō no Shirubā Cheisā" (Japanese: 炎のシルバーチェイサー)	April 27, 1999
An elderly man causes traffic jams for his inability to interpret modern rules correctly, but when Kobayakawa's patrol breaks in the middle of the street, he offers the pair his heavily modified Mazda Carol 360 to capture a runaway criminal aboard a Ferrari.
5.3	"Feel My Heartbeat Crush"; Transliteration: "Kono Mune no Tokimeki wo" (Japanese: この胸のときめきを)	April 28, 1999
Several men are robbed by an allegedly beautiful woman who shows them her breasts hidden under a thick coat and electroshocks them. Disguised as a man. Kobayakawa captures the criminal and discovers it is a man with a fake chest with the ability of producing electric shocks.
5.4	"We're In Action"; Transliteration: "Akushon Shichauzo" (Japanese: アクションしちゃうぞ)	April 29, 1999
A former adult film crew decides to film the Bokuto traffic policewomen when they are on duty, only to be scared by Miyuki and Natsumi's reckless driving and unorthodox methods. The pair daydream about starring their own action movie.
6	"Traffic Control at the Beach"; Transliteration: "Nagisa no Kōtsū Yūdō" (Japanese: 渚の交通誘導)	April 2, 1999
Kachou sends Aoi, Miyuki, Natsumi and Yoriko to watch over a coastal highway on summer vacation, affected by the intense heat and harassed by impatient drivers. The main pair decide it was a bad idea, until they have to save a young woman from drowning and then a purse robber appears on the scene, after saving the girl and capturing the wrongdoer, they receive many gifts from the vacationists, and the four Bokuto officers cause a heavier jam by accomplishing their duties... wearing their swimsuits.

=== Theme songs ===
- Openings
1. "BRAND NEW DAY"
  - Lyricist: Yuko Matsuzaki / Composer: Kazuhiro Hara / Arranger: Kazuhiro Hara / Singers: Mariko Fukui
- Endings
1. "Yell - Next to You" (Yell 〜あなたの隣で〜, Yell - Anata no Tonari de)
  - Lyricist: Shoko Sawada / Composer: Shoko Sawada / Arranger: Hiroshi Uesugi / Singers: emiko

== You're Under Arrest (2001) ==
No.	Title	Original release date
1	"The Order to be Assigned to Bokuto Station"; Transliteration: "Bokutō-sho Kadōka ni Haizoku o Meizu" (Japanese: 墨東署交通課に配属を命ず)	April 7, 2001
Saori Saga starts her first day at Bokuto Precinct Traffic Division, and she quickly finds out that being a meter maid is more exciting than she expected.
2	"Goukon Victory Equation"; Transliteration: "Gōkon Shōri no Hōteishiki" (Japanese: 合コン勝利の方程式)	April 14, 2001
Saori goes to a mixer but ends up catching a thief, instead of a boyfriend.
3	"Tokyo Wild-Beast Dragnet"; Transliteration: "Tōkyō Yajū-Sō Sasen" (Japanese: 東京野獣捜査線)	April 21, 2001
Bokuto Precinct gets involved in monkey business.
4	"Cyber Police 24-Hours"; Transliteration: "Saibā Porisu Niyon-Ji" (Japanese: サイバーポリス２４時)	April 28, 2001
Natsumi and robot engage in 4-round death match.
5	"Chase the Spook Theft Corps"; Transliteration: "Yūrei Settō Dan o Oe" (Japanese: 幽霊窃盗団を追え)	May 5, 2001
No getaway car can outrun Bokuto Precinct Traffic Division - not even a ghost car!
6	"Scoop! Big Love Story"; Transliteration: "Sukūpu! Koi no Dai Bōsō" (Japanese: スクープ！恋の大暴走)	May 12, 2001
Love conquers all - when you're backed by the Bokuto Precinct Traffic Division, that is.
7	"Strike Man is Back"; Transliteration: "Kaette Kita Sutoraiku Otoko" (Japanese: 帰ってきたストライク男)	May 19, 2001
Strikeman is back, but this time he's finally struck out.
8	"Turn Over A Coffee Cup for Two"; Transliteration: "Maware Futari no Kōhī Kappu" (Japanese: 回れ二人のコーヒーカップ)	May 26, 2001
Nakajima scores a date with Miyuki, and hilarity ensues.
9	"Fight of Women! Rival Again!!"; Transliteration: "Onna no Tatakai! Raibaru Futatabi!!" (Japanese: 女の戦い！ライバル再び！！)	June 2, 2001
A challenger has appeared! Yoriko's nemesis Chie Sagamiono has returned to compete against Bokuto Precinct's Color Guard parade contest.
10	"For Bonds"; Transliteration: "Kizuna no Tame ni" (Japanese: 絆のために)	June 9, 2001
Megumi has parent visitation day at school, but she does not tell her dad about it.
11	"Large Panic at the Bokuto Line! Part one" Transliteration: "Bokutō Sen Dai Panikku! Zenpen" (Japanese: 墨東線大パニック！前編)	June 16, 2001
Natsumi and other subway passengers are trapped underground after an earthquake.
12	"Large Panic at the Bokuto Line! Part two" Transliteration: "Bokutō-sen Dai Panikku! Kōhen" (Japanese: 墨東線大パニック！後編)	June 23, 2001
Miyuki and Natsumi must work together to save stranded subway passengers from the collapsing tunnels.
13	"The Fake Policeman VS The Real Policewoman"; Transliteration: "Nise Keikan TAI Narikiri Onna Keiji" (Japanese: ニセ警官ＶＳなりきり女刑事)	June 30, 2001
A TV actress has chosen Natsumi as her role-model. She soon realizes the error of her way.
14	"Cest Si Bon - Love Which Shakes"; Transliteration: "Se Shi Vuon - Yureru Koi Gokoro" (Japanese: セ・シヴォン・揺れる恋心)	July 7, 2001
Thieves learn the hard way, not to burglarize cars in Bokuto Precinct.
15	"Vivid Memories"; Transliteration: "Omoide wa Azayaka ni" (Japanese: 思い出は鮮やかに)	July 14, 2001
Nakajima's parents have a marital spat, and the busybodies at Bokuto Precinct couldn't resist meddling.
16	"The Right Method to Know Mail Friends (^<>^:)"; Transliteration: "Tadashī Meru Tomo no Tsukuri Kata (^<>^:)" (Japanese: 正しいメル友の作り方（＾＜＞＾：）)	July 21, 2001
Aoi's online boyfriend is visiting for the very first time, expecting to meet the woman of his dreams...
17	"A Midsummer Night's Curse"; Transliteration: "Manatsu no Yoru no Noroi" (Japanese: 真夏の夜の呪い)	July 28, 2001
During a scorching summer night, the Bokuto station is haunted by the "legendary weeping policewoman"... or not?
18	"A Choice of Fate Between Cake and Steak!"; Transliteration: "Kēki to Sutēki Unmei no Sentaku!" (Japanese: ケーキとステーキ運命の選択！)	August 4, 2001
The night is young, and love is in the air at Bokuto station... or so thinks Natsumi.
19	"A Shaking Thought"; Transliteration: "Yureru Omoi" (Japanese: ゆれる想い)	August 11, 2001
Natsumi receives an offer she can't refuse, and it's not even food.
20	"The Bus Stop Misunderstanding"; Transliteration: "Sure Chigai no Basu Sutoppu" (Japanese: すれ違いの停車場)	August 18, 2001
Honda-san forgets his cell phone, and ends up missing the bus... or is it Nakajima who actually misses the bus?
21	"A Man, Nakajima's Strained Endurance"; Transliteration: "Otoko, Nakajima Yase Gaman" (Japanese: 男、中嶋 やせがまん)	August 25, 2001
If you truly love someone, set her free... or so thinks Nakajima.
22	"A Combi Dissolution!?"; Transliteration: "Konbi Kaishō!?" (Japanese: コンビ解消！？)	September 1, 2001
Miyuki requests to end her partnership with Natsumi.
23	"Bokuto Station Best Partner"; Transliteration: "Bokutō Sho Besuto Pātonā" (Japanese: 墨東署ベストパートナー)	September 8, 2001
Will the Bokuto station's best partners "kiss and make up"?
24	"Road of Each"; Transliteration: "Sorezore no Michi" (Japanese: それぞれの道)	September 15, 2001
On Natsumi's last day at Bokuto station, the gang throw her a sendoff party.
25	"Bridge Built for Tomorrow"; Transliteration: "Asu ni Kakeru Hashi" (Japanese: 明日に架ける橋)	September 22, 2001
Natsumi visits on the day a new bridge opens in Bokuto Precinct.
26	"Hotspring - Kimono - Confession?"; Transliteration: "Onsen - Yukata - Kokuhaku?" (Japanese: 温泉・浴衣・告白？)	September 29, 2001
Nakajima wins a free trip to a hot spring, and hilarity ensues.

=== Theme songs ===
- Openings
1. "starting UP"
  - Lyricist: Juria Matsuda / Composer: Kazuhiro Hara / Arranger: Miki Watanabe / Singers: Juria Matsuda
- Endings
1. "Blooming Days"
  - Lyricist: Takako Shirai / Composer: Takako Shirai / Arranger: Takako Shirai / Singers: Takako Shirai

=== OVA special ===
No.	Title	Original release date
27	"You're Under Arrest: No Mercy!!"; Transliteration: "Taiho Shichau zo in America" (Japanese: 逮捕しちゃうぞ イン アメリカ)	April 25, 2002
Even America isn't safe from the fury of Japanese policewomen Miyuki and Natsumi.

==== Theme songs ====
- Openings
1. "Special Day"
  - Lyricist: Yuko Matsuzaki / Composer: Little Voice / Arranger: Yuta Yamashita / Singers: Sakiko Tamagawa & Akiko Hiramatsu
- Endings
1. "Promise"
  - Lyricist: Takeshi Yokoyama / Composer: Little Voice / Arranger: N^T / Singers: Mariko Fukui

== Drama ==
No.	Title	Original release date
"FILE 1"	October 17, 2002	
Miyuki and Natsumi must find a way to prevent their friend Yuka from harming herself due to school and online bullying. Special guest star: Ian Thorpe as himself.
"FILE 2"	October 24, 2002	
The pair try to stop a couple of thieves who kidnapped a bus, onboard is a deaf girl who is looking to visit her mother before she undergoes surgery.
"FILE 3"	October 31, 2002	
A stalker targets Kobayakawa.
"FILE 4"	November 7, 2002	
A series of bombings occurs all over Tokyo. Meanwhile. Miyuki and Natsumi partnership is on jeopardy after Tsujimoto apparently had a one-night stand with Nakajima while drunk.
"FILE 5"	November 14, 2002	
During an onsen trip, the Bokuto officers can't enjoy their vacation as criminals strike. Targeting the former fiance of the hotel's maid who is a suspect of drug trafficking.
"FILE 6"	November 21, 2002	
The sister of Nakajima's former girlfriend gets in trouble with a band of thieves. Special guest star: Bob Sapp as Bob Hage.
"FILE 7"	November 28, 2002	
When a friend of the duo is blamed for a hit and run. They must team up with the victim's little son to catch the real criminal.
"FILE 8"	December 5, 2002	
Miyuki is stunned when Natsumi suddenly announces she's marrying a rich entrepreneur who has lost his three previous wives. Kobayakawa suspects the man to be a murderer and tries to protect her partner.
"FILE 9"	December 12, 2002	
After successfully helping the police to catch the killer from the previous episode. Natsumi is invited to a Special Investigation Unit, thus leaving Bokuto station. But when Maki, the deaf girl from episode 2, is hit by a car driven by the son of a politician and the Police refuses to investigate. Kobayakawa and Tsujimoto must defeat both the criminal and corrupt officers to get justice for their friend.

== You're Under Arrest: Full Throttle ==
No.	Title	Original release date
1	"Prologue of Racing"; Transliteration: "Gekisō no Purorōgu" (Japanese: 激走のプロローグ)	October 4, 2007
Miyuki returns to Japan from forensic training in America while Natsumi returns to Bokuto Precinct from Ranger training under the JGSDF. Their first day back on the job wasn't great when they get tangled with foreign gunmen hired to kidnap an American-Japanese named Randy Hammond, son of the late millionaire George Hammond.
2	"The Small Samurai"; Transliteration: "Chīsana Samurai" (Japanese: 小さなサムライ)	October 11, 2007
Following the failed attempt to kidnap Randy, Kachou placed him under custody of the Bokuto Station, despite objections from Hammond representatives that he must be back in America and not see Ikari Toranosuke, Randy's maternal grandfather. Natsumi and Miyuki assist Randy in seeing Ikari in order to mend their family ties.
3	"Strong Arm! The Prohibited Wrestler"; Transliteration: "Gōwan! Chūkin Resurā" (Japanese: 豪腕！駐禁レスラー)	October 18, 2007
Miyuki and Natsumi take on an ex-professional wrestler, taking the law into his own hands with the use of his muscular power on illegally parked cars by tossing them against the wall as a means of showing off his strength from his former wrestling days.
4	"Bokuto Station Snake Panic"; Transliteration: "Bokutō-sho Sunēku Panikku" (Japanese: 墨東署スネークパニック)	October 25, 2007
Screams are heard from the police radio in the patrol car Aoi and Yoriko are in. Bokuto Station misinterprets the noises on their police radio to be some creature, but turns out to be a large iguana. Natsumi and Miyuki decide to transport the iguana back to its owner.
5	"Carlock Baby"; Transliteration: "Kārokku Beibī" (Japanese: カーロック・ベイビー)	November 1, 2007
Car thefts have become more widespread in the city, and the investigative unit has requested the traffic department to help aid them in their work. At this time, someone reports fire breaking out in a carpark. When Bokuto police arrives at the scene, the fire has been mysteriously put out, and money is found missing from the car owners involved. A woman seeks help from Natsumi, Miyuki and the others about her baby, who has disappeared from her car.
6	"Aoi-chan Becomes a Man!?"; Transliteration: "Aoi-chan Otoko ni Naru!?" (Japanese: 葵ちゃん漢になる！？)	November 8, 2007
A police regional consultant named Udamura Kumanosuke arrives in Bokuto City, having been dispatched to work in the area. Everyone in the station meets Udamura, all except Aoi, who avoids him. It turns out that Udamura is Aoi's previous superior in the force. He strongly disapproves of Aoi's identity as a trans woman and hopes to make her turn into a man.
7	"Chase the Mysterious Taxi!!"; Transliteration: "Nazo no Takushī o Oe!!" (Japanese: 謎のタクシーを追え！！)	November 15, 2007
A mysterious string of attacks on drunk females via taxicab had forced Miyuki and Natsumi to undergo a sting operation without Bokuto Station approval to capture the criminals. Natsumi gets drunk during the said operation to apprehend the criminals while Miyuki gets incapacitated, forcing Ken to take on the impostor taxicab.
8	"A Section Chief and A Girl and A Picnic"; Transliteration: "Kachō to Shōjo to Pikunikku" (Japanese: 課長と少女とピクニック)	November 22, 2007
A young girl named Souko thinks of Kachou as her father. Miyuki and Natsumi found out that Kachou had a resemblance to Souko's father, who died in a traffic accident when on duty as a truck driver. Natsumi and Kachou decide to help play along with Souko's grandmother in order to appease her anxiety of not having her father around with her after his death and the absence of her mother from her life.
9	"Yoriko Nikaidou's Age"; Transliteration: "Nikaidō Yoriko wa Otoshigoro" (Japanese: 二階堂頼子はお年頃)	November 29, 2007
Yoriko becomes a bit insecure with her job and love life. She begins to question her purpose as a female police officer when she was able to save a young elementary school student from being harassed by Yakuza thugs.
10	"Natsumi Becomes a Robot?"; Transliteration: "Natsumi Robotto ni Naru?" (Japanese: 夏実ロボットになる？)	December 6, 2007
Miyuki and Natsumi get involved in a demonstration of rescue robots and equipment during an exhibition. However, a renegade scientist obsessed with maintaining law and order threatens to sabotage the exhibition show.
11	"To the Most Important Person in the Entire World"; Transliteration: "Sekai de Ichiban Daiji na Kimi e" (Japanese: 世界で一番大事な君へ)	December 13, 2007
Ken had decided to confess his suppressed feelings to Miyuki by writing a love letter to her. But in the process of giving it to Miyuki, Ken encounters some problems that included a recycling truck on fire after the letter had been blown by the wind from the roof of Bokuto Station to the truck's rear cab.
12	"Showdown! Criminal Affairs Division VS Traffic Division"; Transliteration: "Taiketsu! Keiji ka Tai kōtsū ka" (Japanese: 対決！刑事課ＶＳ交通課)	December 20, 2007
Miyuki and Natsumi leads the entire Traffic Division against Tokuno's Criminal Affairs Division to a game of baseball. Unfortunately, Strike Man returns after months of training to defeat Natsumi when he interrupts their game.
13	"Cursed Garbage Factory"; Transliteration: "Noroi no Gomi Kōjō" (Japanese: 呪いのゴミ工場)	January 10, 2008
Miyuki and Natsumi began to investigate an abandoned garbage recycling center after an urban legend told by Yoriko tells of a ghost lurking inside with the rise of illegal garbage dumping in the Sumida-ku area.
14	"Suspects are Ten Thousand people" Transliteration: "Higisha wa Ichi Man-nin" (Japanese: 被疑者は一万人)	January 17, 2008
After a trio of bank robbers get into a hit and run involving a woman crossing a deserted street in the middle of the day, Natsumi and Miyuki with Ken, Aoi and Yoriko track down the suspects while using the victim's dog to locate the suspects hiding among the participants of a Bokuto costume parade.
15	"Super Shoot! Bokuto Station 24 hours" Transliteration: "Gekisatsu! Bokutō-sho Nijū Yoji" (Japanese: 激撮！墨東署２４時)	January 24, 2008
A civilian documentary crew films most of the Bokuto PD's traffic division, but the director decides to turn things up when he engineers a fake suicide attempt after he hires someone to pretend that he would commit suicide by jumping from the building's roof.
16	"A Monkey and Mushroom and a Time Bomb"; Transliteration: "Saru to Kinoko to Jigen Bakudan" (Japanese: サルとキノコと時限爆弾)	January 31, 2008
Miyuki, Natsumi, Aoi and Yoriko are dispatched by Kachou to a local children's event after supposedly receiving a bombing threat from an anarchist bomber. The officers receive help from local children after one of them had unknowingly stolen a prize item from the fair.
17	"Blast it into your dreams!" Transliteration: "Yume no Naka made Buttobase!" (Japanese: 夢の中までぶっとばせ！)	February 7, 2008
Detective Tokuno asks Kachou for assistance after a mysterious thief known as Spider keeps evading police detection and arrest due to his acrobatic skills. Meanwhile, Natsumi gets a cold and is forced to stay home and recover. She stumbles upon the burglar while trying to get something to eat. Natsumi unknowingly got the rest of her colleagues sick after Aoi and Yoriko ate with Natsumi in Miyuki's apartment.
18	"Beach Side Run"; Transliteration: "Bīchi Saido Ran" (Japanese: ビーチ サイド ラン)	February 14, 2008
Natsumi, Miyuki, Aoi and Yoriko head out to the beach with their ex-colleague Saori, now an officer in Johoku station's cyber crimes division. Their day off changes to a manhunt when the officers were told of voyeurism being done on the beach with some unknown perpetrators picturing girls.
19	"Unbreakable Bond"; Transliteration: "Yuzurenai Kizuna" (Japanese: ゆずれない絆)	February 28, 2008
After failing to catch a criminal, Natsumi decided to write a report to make up for failing to catch the suspects in a black car. Natsumi realizes that she may be unreliable and while she is drunk, she tells Miyuki that she will do all her things alone, which leads onto a fight. Natsumi later apologizes to Miyuki and tells her to rely on her a bit even though she is like this. The two amend their ties after apprehending the same suspects.
20	"Pure Hearted Modesty in Bokuto"; Transliteration: "Bokutō Junjō Kitan" (Japanese: 墨東純情忌憚)	March 6, 2008
Natsumi recovers the diary of a high school student who was recently killed in a traffic accident. She decides to honor her memory by putting a small memorial after reading through her diary entries.
21	"Pursuit! Red Phantom"; Transliteration: "Tsuigeki! Reddo Fantomu" (Japanese: 追撃！レッドファントム)	March 13, 2008
The entire Bokuto station is involved in arresting a highly tricked out racing car known as the "Red Phantom" after it incapacitated a group of racers. But after Nakajima and the other officers tried to apprehend him, the "Red Phantom" was able to escape leaving some officers including Nakajima injured. Miyuki prepared a letter of resignation over the fact that she was not able to arrest the "Red Phantom" despite being told by the Chief that the NPA would prepare guidelines for them.
22	"The Fate of Full Throttle"; Transliteration: "Unmei no Furu Surottoru" (Japanese: 運命のフルスロットル)	March 20, 2008
Miyuki heads out to stop the "Red Phantom". Despite getting help from Daimaru, she and the culprit get into an accident with the two cut off from civilization before SAR teams were able to secure Miyuki and arrest the wounded "Red Phantom" while salvaging Miyuki's Honda Today.
23	"You're Under Arrest (Extra)"; Transliteration: "Taiho Shichaumon (Bangaihen)" (Japanese: 逮捕しちゃうもん （番外編）)	March 27, 2008
Yoriko and Aoi wanted to be like Natsumi and Miyuki. But despite their failures, the duo get a chance to prove their worth as police officers when they chase down a pickpocket.

=== DVD episode ===
No.	Title	Original release date
24	"Where We Stand"; Transliteration: "Watashi-tachi no Iru Basho" (Japanese: わたしたちの居る場所)	August 22, 2008
Natsumi and Miyuki are tasked by the Chief to teach two recruits how things work in the Bokuto Police Station, teaching them the ropes of being a police officer. Meanwhile, Yoriko informs Miyuki that she's the next officer to contribute to a journal in the station, which she gladly accepts.

=== Theme songs ===
- Openings
1. "Mighty Buddy" (マイティー・バディ, Maitī Badi)
  - Lyricist: AA & CHINO / Composer: Shina Nagano (TWO-MIX) / Arranger: Suzuki Daichi Hideyuki / Singers: AA & CHINO
- Endings
1. "1/2 (Half)" (１/２（はんぶん）, 1/2 (Hanbun))
  - Lyricist: Chiaki Ishikawa / Composer: Chiaki Ishikawa / Arranger: Masara Nishida / Singers: Chiaki Ishikawa of See-saw
