= Miyaji (surname) =

Miyaji is a Japanese surname that may refer to

- Atsuko Miyaji, Japanese cryptographer and number theorist
- Katsuhiko Miyaji (born 1971), Japanese baseball outfielder
- Kazuaki Miyaji (born 1940), Japanese politician
- Mao Miyaji (born 1984), Japanese actress
- Masayuki Miyaji (born 1976), Japanese anime director and supervisor
- Takeshi Miyaji (1965–2011), Japanese video game developer
- Toshio Miyaji, Japanese football player
- Yoshihisa Miyaji (born 1973), Japanese weightlifter
- Yōsuke Miyaji (born 1987), Japanese football player
