= Keiko =

Keiko may refer to:

- Keiko (given name), a feminine Japanese given name
- Emperor Keiko
- Keiko (orca), a performing killer whale best known for the film Free Willy
  - "Keiko" (song), a single by Lucerito dedicated to Keiko the orca
- Keiko (musician), the lead vocalist of the Japanese band Globe
- Keiko eiga, Japanese tendency film
- Keiko O'Brien, fictional character in 1990s Star Trek TV shows The Next Generation and Deep Space Nine
- Keiko (film), a 1979 Japanese film
- Keiko, a kind of Japanese armour
- Keiko Fujimori, Peruvian politician and daughter of Alberto Fujimori

== See also ==
- Kiko (disambiguation)
- Quico (disambiguation)
