= Budo Renshu =

Budo Renshu (武道練習, Budō Renshū, lit. "budo practice") is a technical manual describing 166 techniques of the martial art of aikido. It was written by aikido's founder, Morihei Ueshiba and his student Kenji Tomiki, and illustrated by Takako Kunigoshi.

Budo Renshu was published in 1933, and thus details Ueshiba's pre-war aikido techniques, when the art he was teaching was essentially Daitō-ryū Aiki-jūjutsu. The book was only produced in small quantities, and was made available to selected students at the Kobukan Dojo, to whom it was presented as a teaching licence.
