= Quico =

Quico or Quicos may refer to:

== People ==
- Quico (footballer) (José Antonio Ruiz Palácios, born 1961), former Spanish soccer player
- Quico Canseco (born 1949), American politician
- Quico Chacón (born 1934), former professional footballer who played in the Costa Rican Primera División and Mexican Primera División
- El Quico, Francesc Sabaté Llopart, a Catalan anarchist
- Quico Comesaña (born 1962), band member of Berrogüetto
- Quico Cortés, Spanish field hockey player

== Other uses ==
- Quico (El Chavo del Ocho), a character in El Chavo del Ocho and Federrico series, played by Carlos Villagrán.
- Quicos, a name for corn nuts

== See also ==
- Keiko (disambiguation)
- Kiko (disambiguation)
