= Kiko (given name) =

Kiko is a given name. It is also used as a nickname for Francisco, Enrique and Federico. It may refer to:

== People ==
- Kristian Kiko Alonso (born 1990), American football linebacker
- Kiko Amat (born 1971), Spanish writer
- Francis Kiko Aquino Dee (born 1991), Filipino political analyst
- Francisco Kiko Argüello (born 1939), Spanish artist and one of the initiators of the Catholic group Neocatechumenal Way
- Francisco Kiko Barzaga (born 1998), Filipino congressman
- Enrico Kiko Calero (born 1975), Puerto Rican form Major League Baseball relief pitcher
- Arnoldo Castro (1939–2013), Mexican baseball player
- Francisco Kiko Celeguim (born 1984), Brazilian politician
- Francisco Kiko Casilla (born 1986), Spanish football goalkeeper
- Francisco Kiko Femenía (born 1991), Spanish footballer
- Alfonso Kiko Garcia (born 1953), American former Major League Baseball infielder
- Pedro Kiko Loureiro (born 1972), Brazilian heavy metal guitarist
- Francisco Kiko Martínez (born 1984), Spanish boxer
- Francisco Kiko Matos (born 1990), Filipino-Portuguese actor and mixed martial artist
- Khaled Mouelhi (born 1981), Tunisian footballer
- Kiko Merley (born 1997), American music producer with the American hip-hop band Brockhampton
- Francis Kiko Pangilinan (born 1963), Filipino senator
- Francisco Kiko Sánchez (born 1965), Spanish sailor and 1992 Olympic gold medalist
- Enrique Kiko Torres (born 1975), Spanish retired footballer
- Kiko Yokota (born 1997), Japanese former rhythmic gymnast
- Kheireddine Zarabi (born 1984), Algerian footballer

=== Others ===
- Kiko, nickname of Prince Christoph of Hohenlohe-Langenburg (1956–2006), European socialite
- Lolo Kiko, a nickname given by Filipinos to Pope Francis (1936–2025) during his visit to the Philippines in 2015

== Fictional characters ==
- Kiko, host of the Gorgeous Tiny Chicken Machine Show
- Kiko, in the film The Son of Kong
- Kiko, played by Carlos Villagrán in the Mexican TV series Chavo del Ocho and Ah, qué Kiko!
- Kiko the Kangaroo, in a number of Terrytoons cartoons during 1936 and 1937
- Kiko, a rabbit that belonged to Bloom in Winx Club
- Kiko, in the film Turistas, played by Agles Steib
- Kiko, a villain in the video game James Bond 007: Nightfire
- Kiiko Sasaki, in the anime series Laughing Under the Clouds
- Kiko Matsing, a monkey muppet character in the Filipino children's show Batibot
- Kiko of Neverland, in the book series The School for Good and Evil

== See also ==
- Kiko (disambiguation)
