= Nishinokyō Station =

Railway station in Nara, Nara Prefecture, Japan

Nishinokyō Station 西ノ京駅
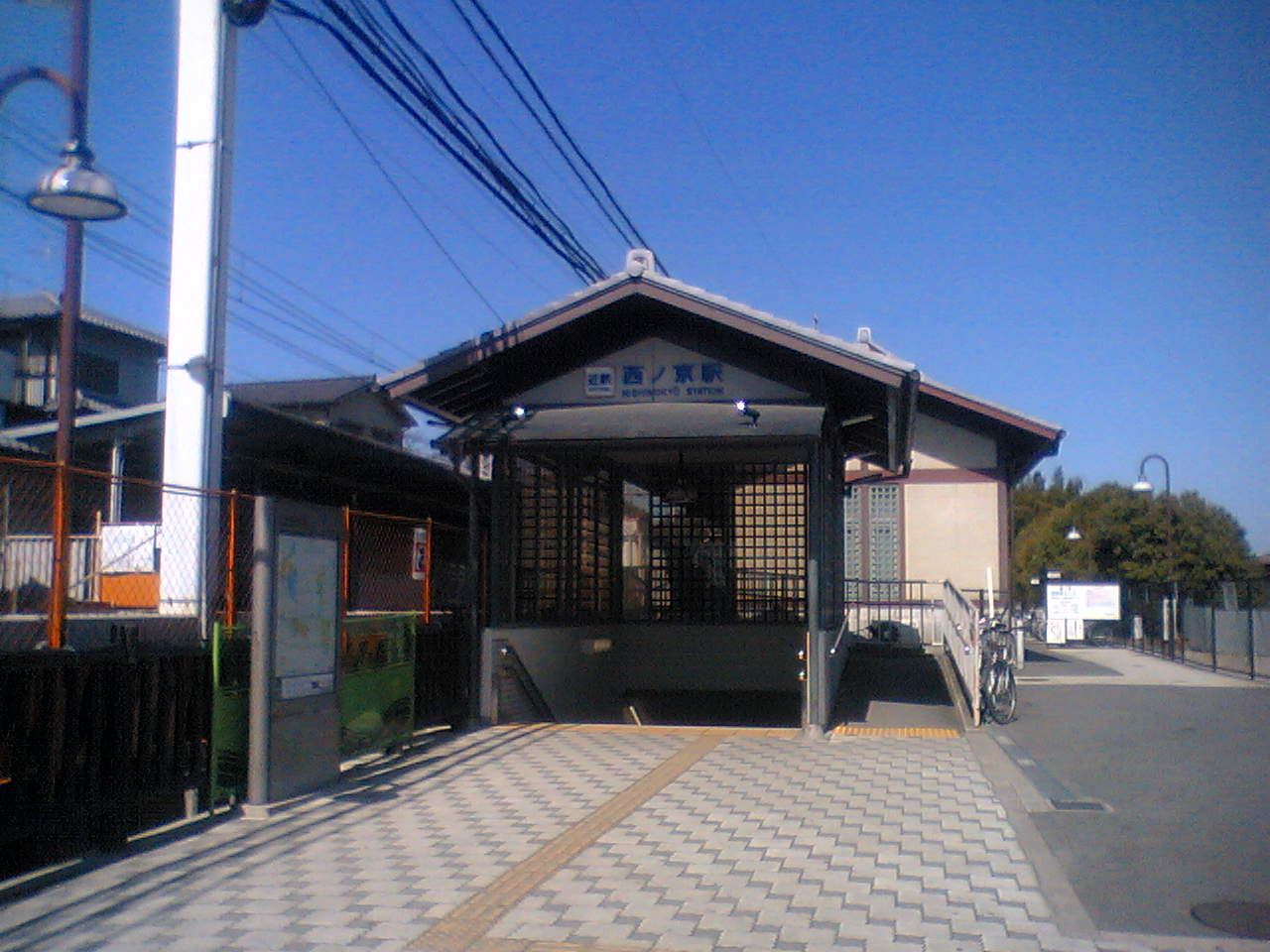
- Nishinokyō Station—March 2007

General information
- Location: 408, Nishinokyōchō, Nara-shi, Nara-ken 630-8042; Japan
- Coordinates: 34°40′13″N 135°47′00″E
- System: Kintetsu Railway commuter rail station
- Owner: Kintetsu Railway
- Operator: Kintetsu Railway
- Line: B Kashihara Line
- Distance: 2.8 km (1.7 miles)
- Platforms: 2 side platforms
- Tracks: 2
- Train operators: Kintetsu Railway
- Bus stands: 1
- Connections: Nara Kotsu Bus Lines: 63・64・65・67・70・72

Construction
- Structure type: At grade
- Parking: None
- Cycle facilities: Available
- Accessible: Yes (2 elevators for the ticket gate, 2 elevators / 1 accessible slope for the platforms, 1 bathroom, and equipped wheelchairs)

Other information
- Station code: B28
- Website: www.kintetsu.co.jp/station/station_info/en_station06007.html

History
- Opened: 1 April 1921
- Rebuilt: 1996

Passengers
- FY2022: 4,218 daily
Services
Preceding station	Kintetsu Railway	Following station
B Kashihara Line
Amagatsuji towards Kyōto, Shin-Tanabe or Yamato-Saidaiji	Local	Kujō towards Kashiharajingū-mae or Tenri
Yamato-Saidaiji Off-peak only (M—F: 10—16, W/E: 9—18) towards Kyōto or Yamato-Saidaiji	Express	Kintetsu-Kōriyama Off-peak only (M—F: 10—16, W/E: 9—18) towards Kashiharajingū-mae or Tenri
Yamato-Saidaiji Off-peak only (M—F: 10—16, W/E: 9—18) towards Kyōto or Yamato-Saidaiji	Limited Express	Kashiharajingū-mae Off-peak only (M—F: 10—16, W/E: 9—18) Terminus
Location

Nishinokyō Station (西ノ京駅, Nishinokyō-eki) is a passenger railway station located in the city of Nara, Nara Prefecture, Japan. It is operated by the private transportation company, Kintetsu Railway.

== Line ==
Nishinokyō Station is served by the Kashihara Line and is 2.8 kilometers from the starting point of the line at Yamato-Saidaiji and 37.4 kilometers from Kyoto..

== Layout ==
The station consists two opposed side platforms and two tracks. The effective length of the platform is six cars. There is only one ticket gate. The ticket gates and concourse are underground, and the platform is above ground. There are two ticket gates, one on the east side and one on the west side, with entrances and exits on both platforms toward Kashihara. The station is staffed.

== Platforms ==
1	■ B Kashihara Line	for Yamato-Yagi and Kashihara-Jingumae
2	■ B Kashihara Line	for Yamato-Saidaiji and Kyoto

== History ==
Nishinokyō Station was opened 1 April 1921 as a station on the Osaka Electric Tramway Unebi Line (now the Kashihara Line). The station became a Kansai Express Railway station due to a company merger with Sangu Express Railway in 1941, which became part of the Kintetsu Railway network in 1944. The station was rebuilt as an underground station in 1996.

== Passenger statistics ==
In fiscal 2022, the station was used by an average of 30,014 passengers daily (boarding passengers only).

== Surrounding area ==
- Tōshōdai-ji Temple
- Yakushi-ji Temple

== See also ==
- List of railway stations in Japan
