= Kikos =

Kikos may refer to:

- Kikos (1931 film), Armenian film
- Kikos (1979 film), animated Armenian film

== See also ==
- Kiko (disambiguation)
