= Takako Kunigoshi =

Japanese aikidoka

Takako Kunigoshi (1909–2000) was a Japanese practitioner of aikido. She was an early student of Morihei Ueshiba and was one of the first female instructors of the martial art.

Kunigoshi joined Ueshiba's Kobukan dojo in 1933, while still a student at the Women's Fine Arts University. Her artwork was used in Ueshiba's book Budo Renshu, Fujiko Suzuki's Yamato-ryu Goshin Jutsu, and Morihei Ueshiba's Aikido Maki-no-Ichi and she also painted at least one portrait of him. She taught at the personal dojo of Isamu Takeshita as well as teaching self-defence courses for women.

After World War II, Kunigoshi retired from aikido, and devoted her time to the study of chado.
