= Kiko Celeguim =

Brazilian politician (born 1984)

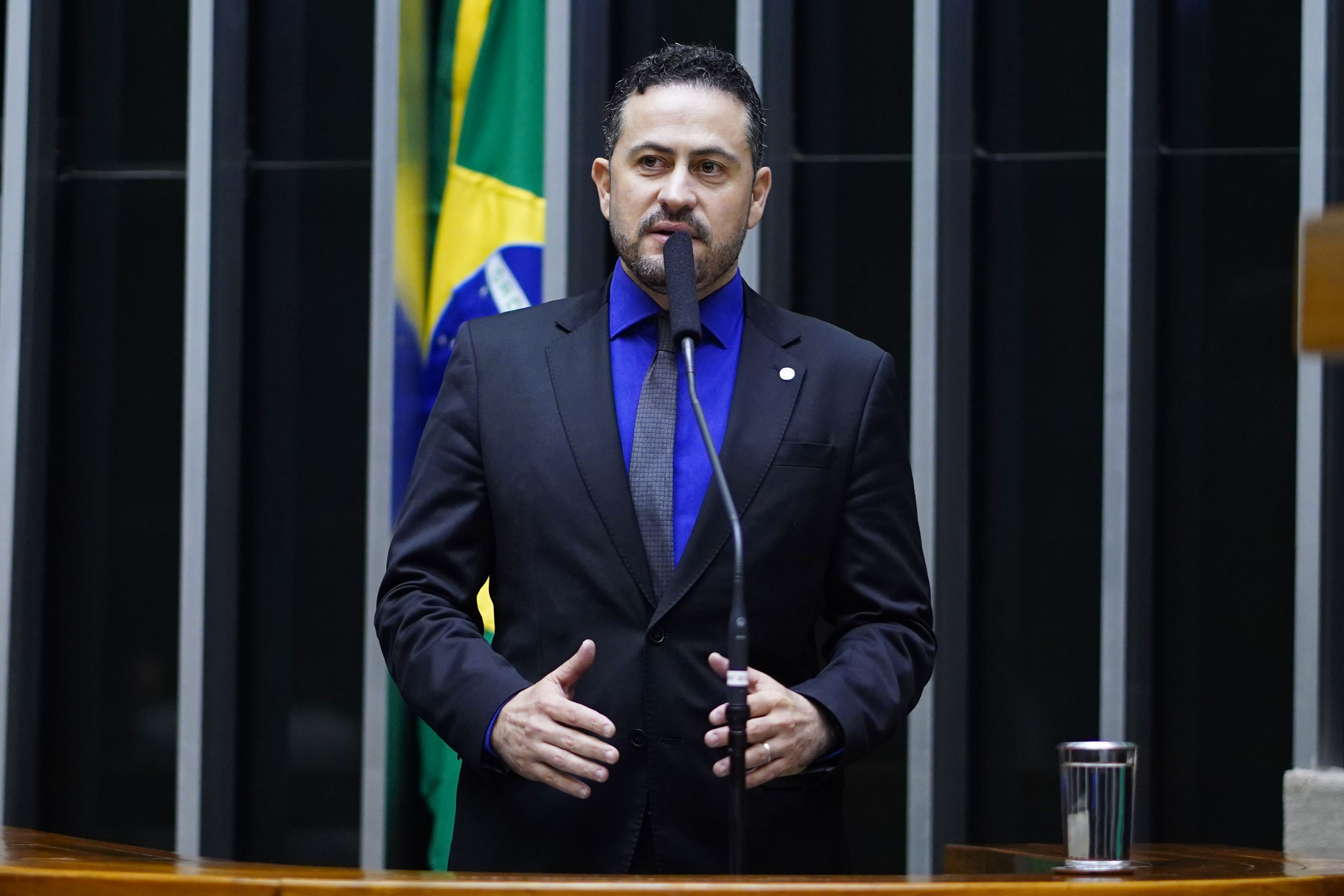
- Celeguim in 2023

Member of the Chamber of Deputies
- Incumbent
- Assumed office 1 February 2023
- Constituency: São Paulo

Mayor of Franco da Rocha
- In office 1 January 2013 – 1 January 2021
- Vice Mayor: Nivaldo Santos
- Preceded by: Marcio Cecchettini
- Succeeded by: Nivaldo Santos

Personal details
- Born: Francisco Daniel Celeguim de Morais; 5 May 1984 (age 42) Franco da Rocha, São Paulo, Brazil
- Party: PT (since 2000)
- Education: Methodist University of São Paulo
- Profession: Journalist
- Website: kikoceleguim.com.br

Francisco Daniel Celeguim de Morais, better known as Kiko Celeguim (born 5 May 1984), is a Brazilian politician serving as a member of the Chamber of Deputies since 2023. From 2013 to 2020, he served as mayor of Franco da Rocha. He is the son of Mário Maurici.
