= Atsuko Toko Fish =

US-Japanese relations expert and philanthropist

Atsuko Toko Fish is a Japanese-American known for her work in promoting women in leadership in Japan, promoting United States-Japan relations, and philanthropy.

== Work ==
Fish grew up in Tokyo and her father was a diplomat who brought an international view to family discussions. In the 1970s, Fish was a sports television producer in Japan, the first woman to hold this role. She moved to the United States in 1983 and worked with Governor Michael Dukakis to help Massachusetts set up a trade and business partnership with Japan. In 2006, Fish founded the Japanese Women's Leadership Initiative which brought Japanese women to the United States to learn leadership from nonprofits and other entities. She founded the Japanese Disaster Relief Fund after 2011 Tōhoku earthquake and tsunami which provided aid from Boston to Japan to provided services in areas impacted by the earthquake and subsequent tsunami. She has worked in support of immigrant populations impacted by the COVID-19 pandemic and received an award from the Rian Immigrant Center in recognition of her work in this arena.

== Awards and honors ==
In 1997, Fish was one of six people awarded the Governor's New American Appreciation Award for her contribution to Massachusetts. In 2012, she was awarded the Foreign Minister's Commendation by Japan's Ministry of Foreign Affairs. In 2013, the United States' White House named Fish a Champion of Change for her work on "innovation and social change". In 2018 Fish received the Order of the Rising Sun, 4th Class, Gold Rays with Rosette, from Emperor Akihito of Japan in recognition of her work on "advancement of women's leadership in Japan".
