= Kikō-ji =

Buddhist temple in Nara, Japan

Kikō-ji 喜光寺
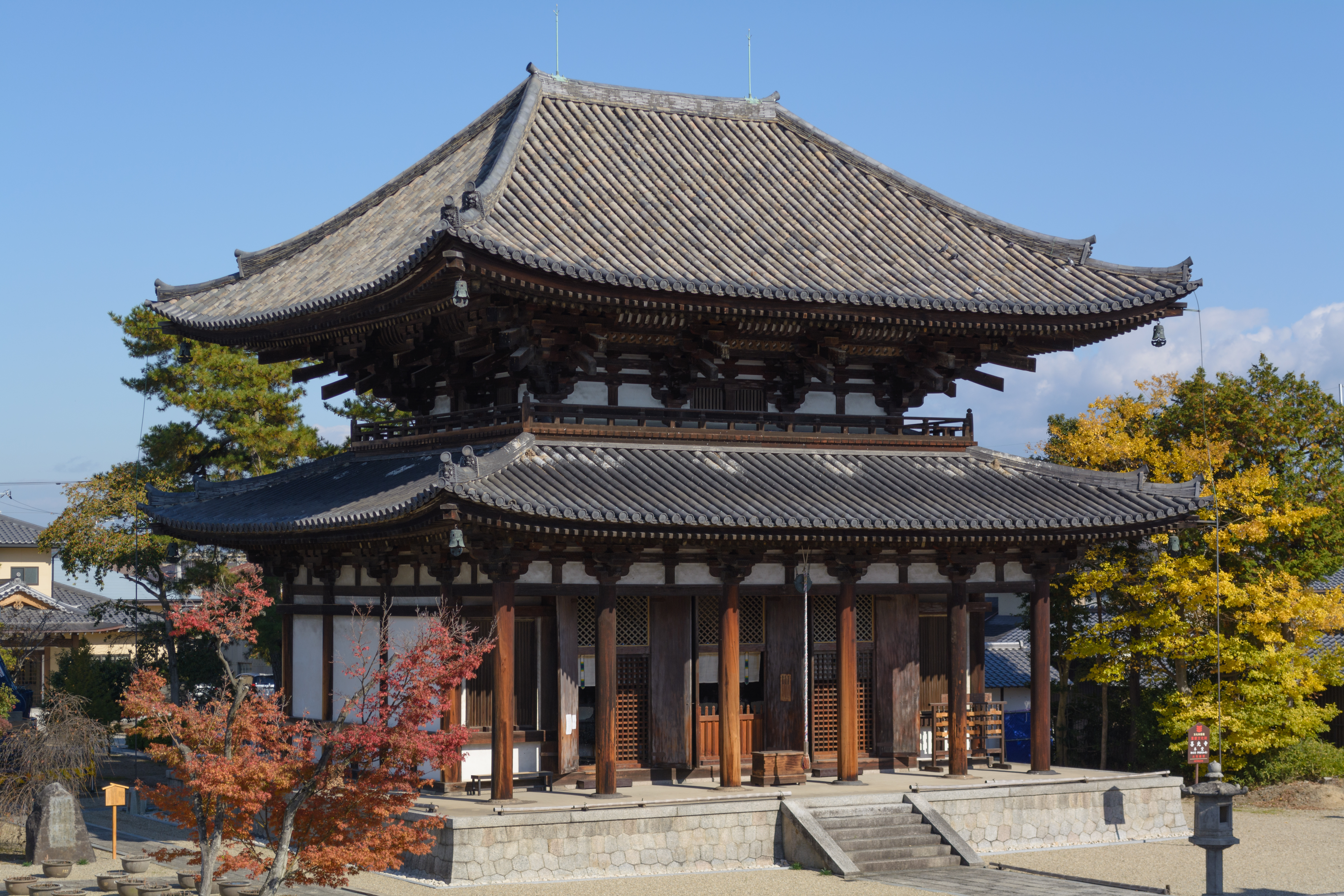
- Hondō, early Muromachi period (ICP)

Religion
- Affiliation: Hossō
- Deity: Amida Nyorai (Amitābha)

Location
- Location: 508 Sugawara-chō, Nara, Nara Prefecture
- Country: Japan
- Interactive map of Kikō-ji 喜光寺
- Coordinates: 34°41′05″N 135°46′40″E

Architecture
- Founder: Gyōki
- Completed: 721

Website
- http://www.kikouji.com/index.html

Kikō-ji (喜光寺) is a Buddhist temple in Nara, Japan. Founded in the eighth century, its Muromachi-period Hondō and the Heian-period statue of Amida Nyorai enshrined within are Important Cultural Properties.

== Name ==
Initially known as Sugawara-dera (菅原寺), the temple is said to have been renamed after a visit in 731 by Emperor Shōmu, when a wondrous ray of light shone forth from the brow of the honzon.

== History ==
Gyōki is said to have founded the temple in 721 and to have died there in 749. The Hondō was re-erected in the early Muromachi period. For a long time temple lay in the midst of rice fields.

== Buildings ==
The three by two bay Hondō, with tiled hipped roof and mokoshi, is unusual among wayō style buildings in being open, like the Tōdai-ji Daibutsuden, for its full height (without the need occasioned by the latter's daibutsu), in being so narrow and shallow relative to its height, and in having an open porch extending across its entire front. An early Muromachi period rebuild, it was dismantled for repair and reconstruction in 1933. It has been designated an Important Cultural Property.

== Treasures ==
In the Hondō are a seated wooden statue of Amida Nyorai dating from the Heian period (ICP), flanked by Kannon and Seishi of the Nanboku-chō period.
