= Atsuko Miyaji =

Japanese cryptographer (born 1965)

Atsuko Miyaji (Japanese: 宮地充子, born 1965) is a Japanese cryptographer and number theorist known for her research on elliptic-curve cryptography and software obfuscation. She is a professor in the Division of Electrical, Electronic and Information Engineering, at Osaka University.

== Education and career ==
Miyaji was born in Osaka Prefecture and became interested in mathematics as an elementary school student after learning of the Epimenides paradox. She studied mathematics as an undergraduate at Osaka University, and chose to go into industry instead of continuing as a graduate student, working from 1990 to 1998 for Matsushita Electric Industrial.

During this time she returned to graduate school, and earned a doctorate from Osaka University in 1997. She became an associate professor at the Japan Advanced Institute of Science and Technology in 1998, and returned to Osaka University as a professor in 2015. She has also held short-term teaching or visiting positions at Osaka Prefecture University, the University of Tsukuba, the University of California, Davis, and Kyoto University.

== Book ==
Miyaji is the author of a 2012 Japanese language book on cryptography, "代数学から学ぶ暗号理論：整数論の基礎から楕円曲線暗号の実装まで".
