= Takako Shirai (singer) =

Japanese singer

Takako Shirai (白井 貴子, Shirai Takako; born 19 January 1959) is a Japanese singer. First performing solo and later with her band Crazy Boys (クレイジーボーイズ), she received some international attention as one of the Japanese acts in the Hurricane Irene Aid Concert.
