= Kasanui Station =

Railway station in Tawaramoto, Nara Prefecture, Japan

Kasanui Station 笠縫駅
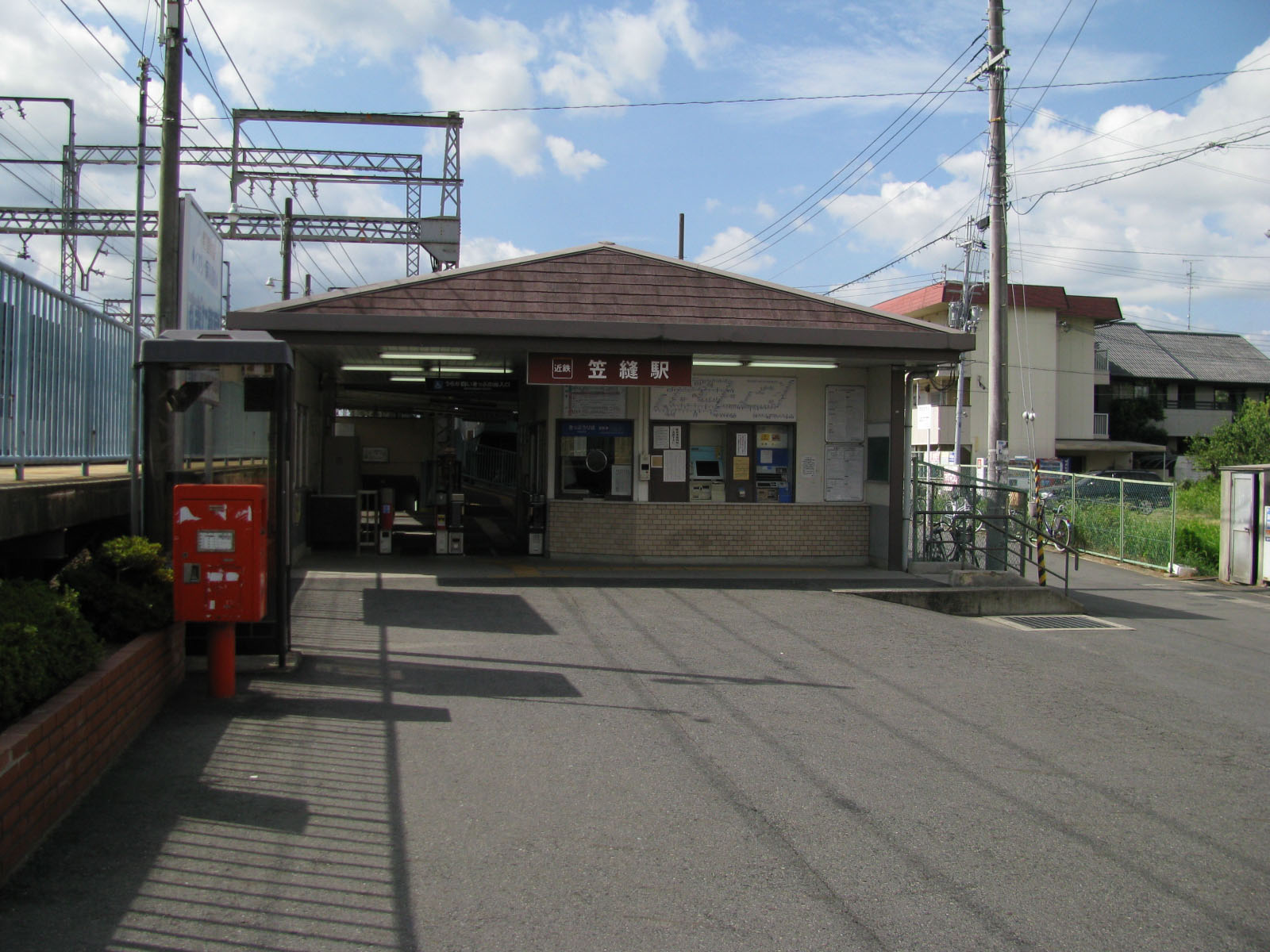
- The station building of Kasanui Station

General information
- Location: 330, Hatanoshō, Tawaramoto-chō, Shiki-gun, Nara-ken 636-0343; Japan
- Coordinates: 34°32′29″N 135°47′39″E
- System: Kintetsu Railway commuter rail station
- Owner: Kintetsu Railway
- Operator: Kintetsu Railway
- Line: B Kashihara Line
- Distance: 17.3 km (10.7 miles)
- Platforms: 2 side platforms
- Tracks: 2
- Train operators: Kintetsu Railway

Construction
- Structure type: At grade
- Parking: None
- Cycle facilities: Available
- Accessible: Yes (slopes for each platform)

Other information
- Station code: B37
- Website: www.kintetsu.co.jp/station/station_info/en_station06016.html

History
- Opened: 21 March 1923

Passengers
- 2019: 13815 daily
Services
Preceding station	Kintetsu Railway	Following station
B Kashihara Line
Tawaramoto towards Kyōto, Shin-Tanabe or Yamato-Saidaiji	Local	Ninokuchi towards Kashiharajingū-mae
Location
- Location within Nara Prefecture Location within Japan

Kasanui Station (笠縫駅, Kasanui-eki) is a passenger railway station located in the town of Tawaramoto, Nara Prefecture, Japan. It is operated by the private transportation company, Kintetsu Railway.

== Line ==
Kasanui Station is served by the Kashihara Line and is 17.3 kilometers from the starting point of the line at Yamato-Saidaiji and 51.9 kilometers from Kyoto

== Layout ==
The station is an above-ground station with two opposing side platforms and two tracks. The station building is on the platform 2 side, and there is also a temporary ticket gate on the platform 1 side for rush hour use only. This ticket gate was left as a temporary ticket gate at the request of local residents, as the station building was located on this side until the underground passage connecting the two platforms was completed. The station is unattended.

== Platforms and tracks ==
1	■ Kashihara Line	for Yamato-Yagi and Kashihara-Jingumae
2	■ Kashihara Line	for Yamato-Saidaiji and Kyoto

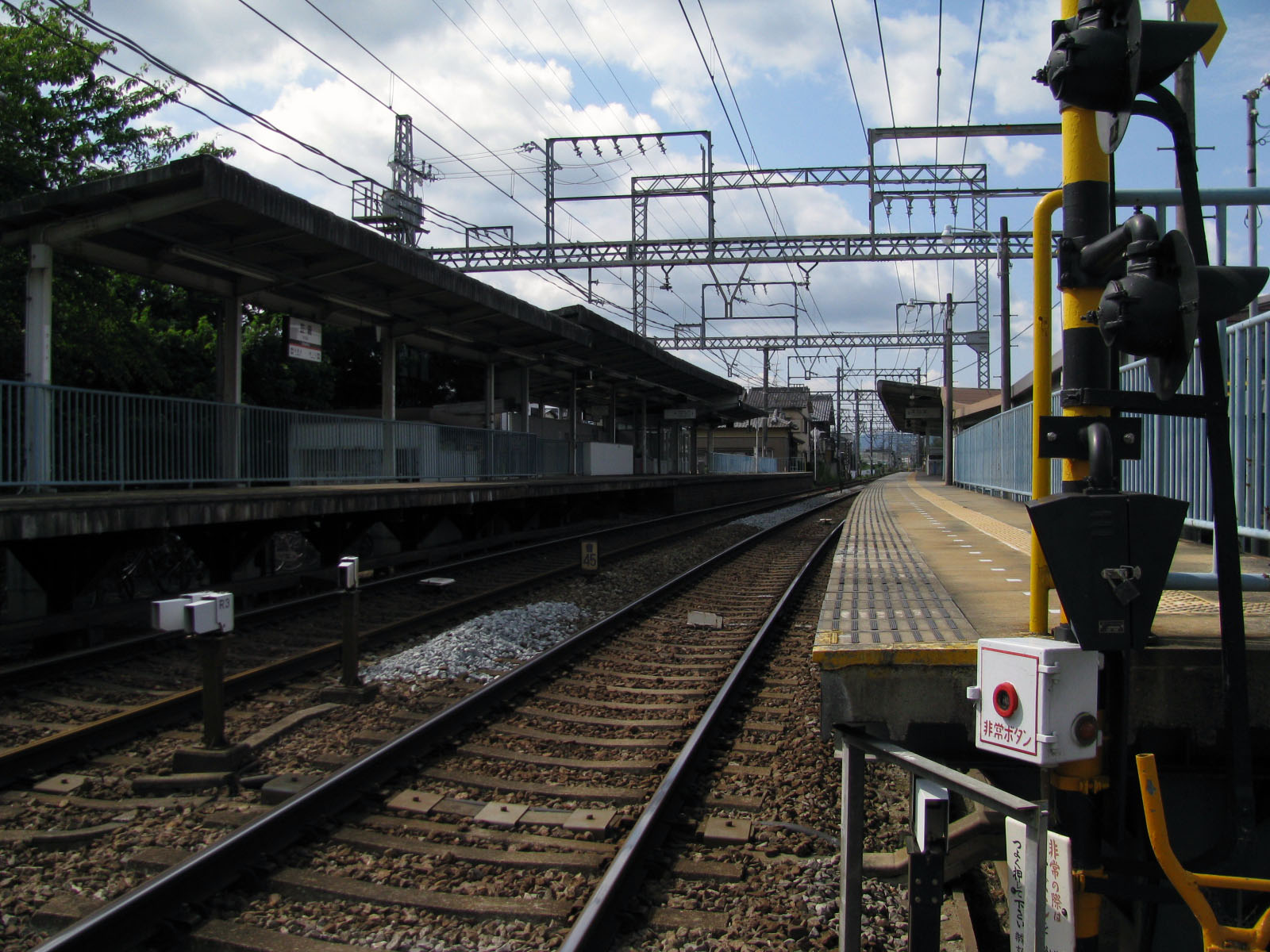
Platform

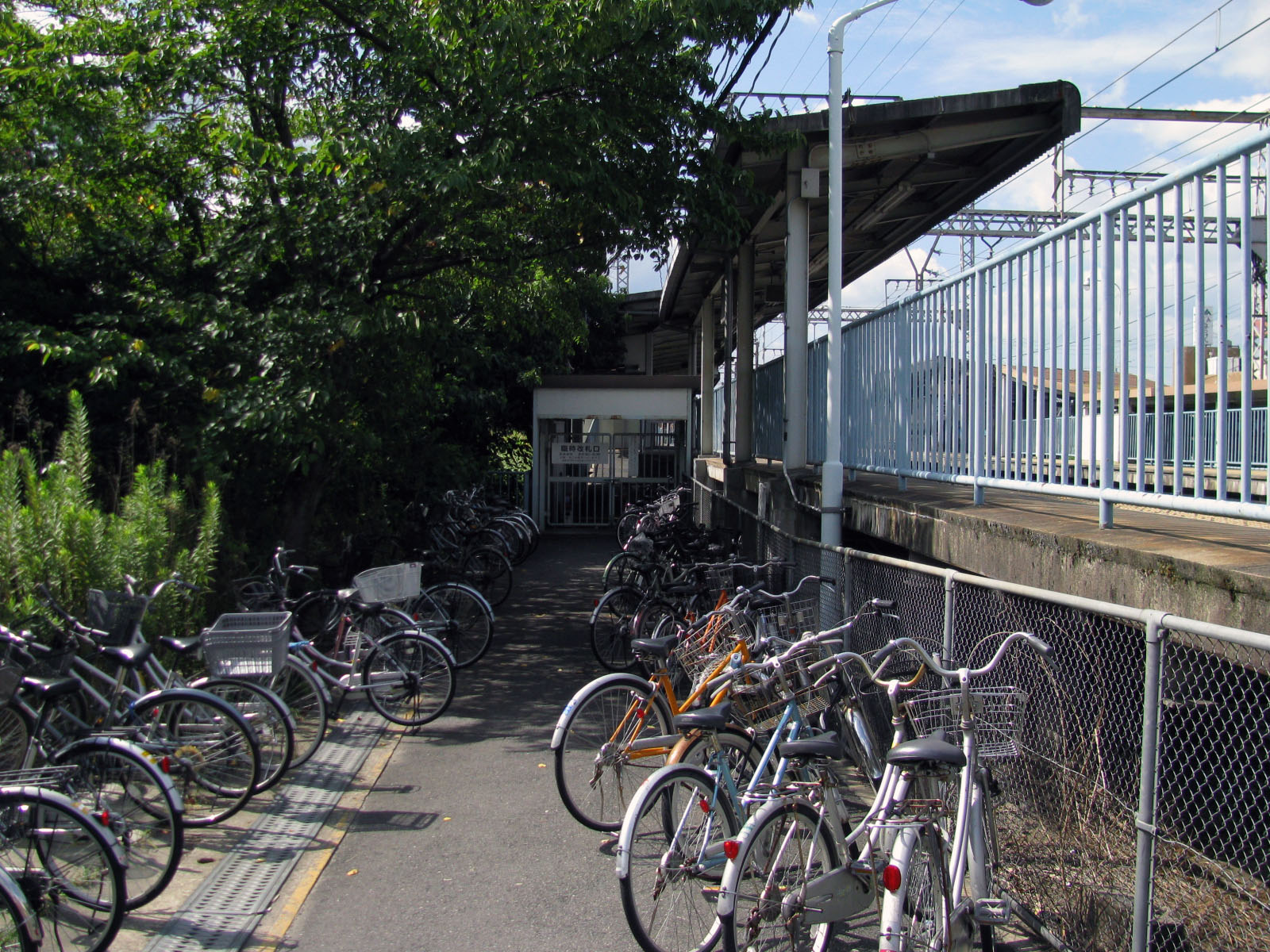
Temporary ticket gate on Platform 1

== History ==
Kasanui Station opened on 21 March 1923 on the Osaka Electric Tramway Unebi Line.

== Passenger statistics ==
In fiscal 2019, the station was used by an average of 1381 passengers daily (boarding passengers only).

== Surrounding area ==
- Jinraku-ji

== See also ==
- List of railway stations in Japan
