= Ninokuchi Station =

Railway station in Kashihara, Nara Prefecture, Japan

Ninokuchi Station 新ノ口駅
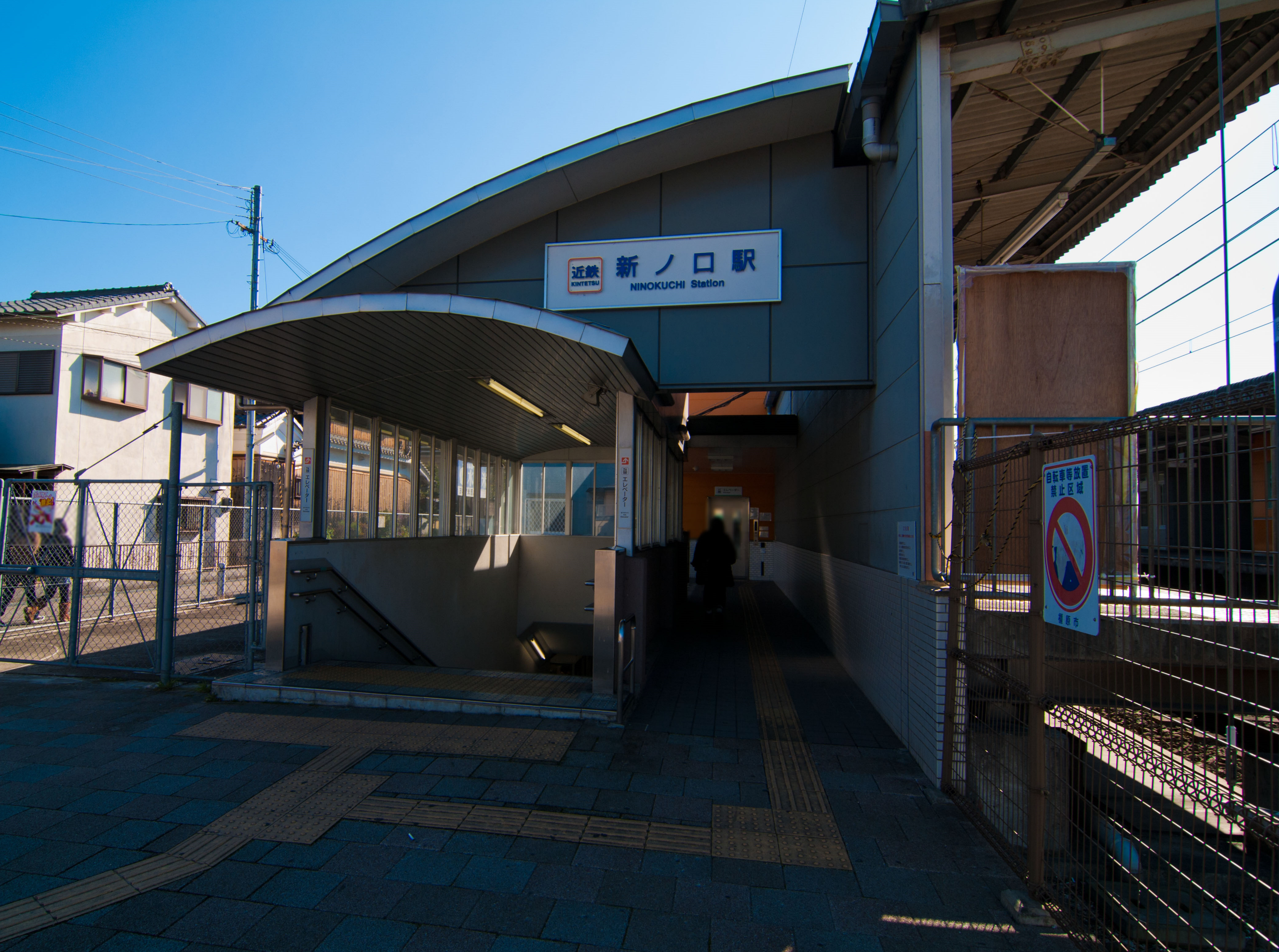
- The station building of Ninokuchi Station

General information
- Location: 127, Ninokuchichō, Kashihara-shi, Nara-ken 634-0802; Japan
- Coordinates: 34°31′31″N 135°47′41″E
- System: Kintetsu Railway commuter rail station
- Owner: Kintetsu Railway
- Operator: Kintetsu Railway
- Line: B Kashihara Line
- Distance: 19.1 km (11.9 miles)
- Platforms: 2 side platforms
- Tracks: 2
- Train operators: Kintetsu Railway
- Connections: Nara Kotsu Bus Lines 64

Construction
- Structure type: At grade
- Parking: None
- Cycle facilities: Available
- Accessible: Yes (2 elevators for the ticket gate and 2 for each platform)

Other information
- Station code: B38
- Website: www.kintetsu.co.jp/station/station_info/en_station06017.html

History
- Opened: 21 March 1923
- Rebuilt: 2003

Passengers
- 2019: 2159 daily
Services
Preceding station	Kintetsu Railway	Following station
B Kashihara Line
Kasanui towards Kyōto, Shin-Tanabe or Yamato-Saidaiji	Local	Yamato-Yagi towards Kashiharajingū-mae
Location

Ninokuchi Station (新ノ口駅, Ninokuchi-eki) is a passenger railway station located in the city of Kashihara, Nara Prefecture, Japan. It is operated by the private transportation company, Kintetsu Railway.

== Line ==
Ninokuchi Station is served by the Kashihara Line and is 19.1 kilometers from the starting point of the line at Yamato-Saidaiji and 53.7 kilometers from Kyoto.

== Layout ==
The station is an above-ground station with two opposed side platforms and two tracks. The effective length of the platform is enough for four cars. The ticket gates and concourse are underground, while the platform is above ground. There are two station entrances and ticket gates. The station is unattended.

== Platforms ==
1	■ B Kashihara Line	for Kashiharajingū-mae
2	■ B Kashihara Line	for Yamato Saidaiji and Kyoto

== History ==
Ninokuchi Station was opened 21 March 1923 as a station on the Osaka Electric Tramway Unebi Line. It became a Kansai Express Railway station due to a company merger with Sangu Express Railway on 15 March 1941, and through a subsequent merger became a station on the Kintetsu Railway on 1 July 1944.

== Passenger statistics ==
In fiscal 2019 the station was used by an average of 2159 passengers daily (boarding passengers only).

== Surrounding area ==
- Nara Prefecture Driver's License Center
- Japan National Route 24
- Kashihara Municipal Miminari Nishi Elementary School
- Kashihara Municipal Kashihara Junior High School

== See also ==
- List of railway stations in Japan
