= List of cultural properties of Japan – paintings (Nara) =

This list is of the cultural properties of Japan designated in the category of paintings (絵画, kaiga) for the Prefecture of Nara.

== National Cultural Properties ==
As of 1 July 2019, one hundred and sixty Important Cultural Properties have been designated (including eighteen *National Treasures), being of national significance.

Property	Date	Municipality	Ownership	Comments	Image	Dimensions	Coordinates	Ref.
*Amida Triad with Boy Attendant, colour on silk 絹本著色阿弥陀三尊及童子像 kenpon chakushoku Amida sanzon oyobi dōji zō	Heian period	Nara	Hokke-ji	three scrolls			34°41′32″N 135°48′15″E	
*Riding an Ox, colour on silk, by Li Di 絹本著色帰牧図〈李迪筆／（騎牛）〉 kenpon chakushoku kiboku zu (Li Di hitsu kigyū)	Southern Song	Nara	Kintetsu (kept at the Yamato Bunkakan)			24.2 centimetres (9.5 in) by 23.8 centimetres (9.4 in)	34°41′43″N 135°45′24″E	
*Kusha Mandala, colour on silk 絹本著色倶舎曼荼羅図 kenpon chakushoku Kusha mandara zu	Heian period	Nara	Tōdai-ji				34°41′20″N 135°50′24″E	
*Jion Daishi, colour on silk 絹本著色慈恩大師像 kenpon chakushoku Jion Daishi zō	Heian period	Nara	Yakushi-ji			161.2 centimetres (63.5 in) by 129.2 centimetres (50.9 in)	34°40′07″N 135°47′04″E	
*Jūichimen Kannon, colour on silk 絹本著色十一面観音像 kenpon chakushoku jūichimen Kannon zō	Heian period	Nara	National Institutes for Cultural Heritage (kept at Nara National Museum)			168.8 centimetres (66.5 in) by 89.6 centimetres (35.3 in)	34°40′59″N 135°50′17″E	
*Twelve Devas, colour on silk 絹本著色十二天像 kenpon chakushoku jūniten zō	Heian period	Nara	Saidai-ji	twelve scrolls		160.0 centimetres (63.0 in) by 134.5 centimetres (53.0 in)	34°41′37″N 135°46′46″E	
*Wall Paintings of Takamatsuzuka Kofun 高松塚古墳壁画; Takamatsuzuka kofun hekiga	c.700	Asuka	MEXT	four walls			34°27′44″N 135°48′23″E	
*Mandala of the Two Realms, gold and silver paint on indigo ground (Kojima Mandala) 紺綾地金銀泥絵両界曼荼羅図〈／（子島曼荼羅）〉 konayaji kingin dei-e ryōkai mandara zu (Kojima mandara)	Heian period	Nara	Kojima-dera (子島寺) (kept at Nara National Museum)	pair of scrolls		351.3 centimetres (138.3 in) by 297.0 centimetres (116.9 in), 349.1 centimetres (137.4 in) by 307.9 centimetres (121.2 in)	34°40′59″N 135°50′17″E	
*Manners and Customs, colour on paper with gold ground, byōbu 紙本金地著色風俗図〈／六曲屏風〉 shihon kinji chakushoku fūzoku zu (rokkyoku byōbu)	Edo period	Nara	Kintetsu (kept at the Yamato Bunkakan)	pair of screens		155.6 centimetres (61.3 in) by 361.6 centimetres (142.4 in)	34°41′43″N 135°45′24″E	
*Sudhana's Pilgrimage to Fifty-five Spiritual Teachers as described in the Flower Garland Sutra, colour on paper 紙本著色華厳五十五所絵巻 shihon chakushoku kegon gojūgosho emaki	Heian period	Nara	Tōdai-ji			29.8 centimetres (11.7 in) by 1,287.0 centimetres (42 ft 2.7 in)	34°41′20″N 135°50′24″E	
*Shigisan-engi, colour on paper 紙本著色信貴山縁起 shihon chakushoku Shigisan-engi	Heian period	Heguri	Chōgosonshi-ji (朝護孫子寺)	three scrolls		31.5 centimetres (12.4 in) by 827 centimetres (27 ft 2 in), 31.25 centimetres (12.30 in) by 1,270.3 centimetres (41 ft 8.1 in), 31.5 centimetres (12.4 in) by 1,416 centimetres (46 ft 5 in)	34°41′20″N 135°50′24″E	
*Nezame Monogatari, colour on paper with gold ground, emaki 紙本著色寝覚物語絵巻 shihon chakushoku Nezame Monogatari emaki	Heian period	Nara	Kintetsu (kept at the Yamato Bunkakan)			26 centimetres (10 in) by 533 centimetres (17 ft 6 in)	34°41′43″N 135°45′24″E	
*Hell Scroll, colour on paper 紙本著色地獄草紙 shihon chakushoku jigoku sōshi	Kamakura period	Nara	National Institutes for Cultural Heritage (kept at Nara National Museum)			26.5 centimetres (10.4 in) by 454.7 centimetres (14 ft 11.0 in)	34°40′59″N 135°50′17″E	
*Extermination of Evil, colour on paper 紙本著色辟邪絵 shihon chakushoku hekija-e	Kamakura period	Nara	National Institutes for Cultural Heritage (kept at Nara National Museum)	five scrolls		25.8 centimetres (10.2 in) to 26.0 centimetres (10.2 in) by 39.2 centimetres (15.4 in) to 77.2 centimetres (30.4 in)	34°40′59″N 135°50′17″E	
*Landscape, ink and light colour on paper, attributed to Shūbun 紙本墨画淡彩山水図〈伝周文筆／〉 shihon bokuga tansai sansui zu (den-Shūbun hitsu)	1445	Nara	National Institutes for Cultural Heritage (kept at Nara National Museum)	dated to Bun'an 2 by the postscript to the third of the accompanying poems		108.0 centimetres (42.5 in) by 32.7 centimetres (12.9 in)	34°40′59″N 135°50′17″E	
*Taishakuten Mandala, colour on wooden boards 板絵著色伝帝釈天曼荼羅図（金堂来迎壁） ita-e chakushoku den-Taishakuten mandara zu (kondō raigō heki)	Heian period	Uda	Murō-ji	in the Kondō			34°32′16″N 136°02′26″E	
*Kichijōten, colour on hemp cloth 麻布著色吉祥天像 mafu chakushoku Kichijōten zō	Nara period	Nara	Yakushi-ji			53.0 centimetres (20.9 in) by 31.7 centimetres (12.5 in)	34°40′06″N 135°47′04″E	
*Wall Paintings of Kitora Kofun キトラ古墳壁画; Kitora kofun hekiga	c.700	Asuka	MEXT				34°27′06″N 135°48′18″E	
Former Jimon-in Partition Paintings, by Sakaki Hyakusen 旧慈門院障壁画〈彭城百川筆／宝暦元年四月の年記がある〉 kyū-Jimon-in shōhekiga	1751	Nara	private (kept at Nara National Museum)	37 panels			34°40′59″N 135°50′17″E	
Wall Paintings from the Outer Sanctuary of the Kondō 金堂外陣旧壁画（土壁） kondō gejin kyū-hekiga	Nara period	Ikaruga	Hōryū-ji	12 panels			34°36′52″N 135°44′14″E	
Wall Paintings from the Inner Sanctuary of the Kondō 金堂内陣旧壁画（土壁） kondō naijin kyū-hekiga	Nara period	Ikaruga	Hōryū-ji	20 panels			34°36′52″N 135°44′14″E	
Dream Journey to the Peach Blossom Land, light colour on silk, by An Gyeon 絹本淡彩夢遊桃源図〈安堅筆／〉 kenpon tansai muyū tōgen zu (An Gyeon hitsu)	1447	Tenri	Tenri Central Library	pair of Joseon hand scrolls; the painting is accompanied by poetry and prose by twenty-one leading writers; the inscription by Grand Prince Anpyeong (third son of Sejong the Great) reads "I am a person who dedicates his body to the palace day and night looking after affairs of state, so how is it that I went to the mountains and forests in my dreams?" Tao Yuanming's utopian Peach Blossom Spring provides the ideological underpinning to the dream			34°35′41″N 135°50′47″E	
Descent of Amida and his Retinue, colour on silk 絹本著色阿弥陀聖衆来迎図 kenpon chakushoku Amida shōjū raigō zu	Kamakura period	Yamatokōriyama	Matsuo-dera (松尾寺)				34°38′03″N 135°43′41″E	
Descent of Amida with Twenty-Five Bosatsu, colour on silk 絹本著色阿弥陀二十五菩薩来迎図 kenpon chakushoku Amida nijūgo bosatsu raigō zu	Kamakura period	Nara	Kōfuku-in (興福院)				34°41′42″N 135°49′21″E	
Descent of Amida, colour on silk 絹本著色阿弥陀来迎図 kenpon chakushoku Amida raigō zu	Heian period	Sakurai	Hase-dera				34°32′09″N 135°54′25″E	
Aizen Myōō, colour on silk 絹本著色愛染明王像 kenpon chakushoku Aizen Myōō zō	Heian period	Kyoto	Hosomi Art Foundation (kept at Hosomi Museum)				35°00′50″N 135°46′47″E	
Aizen Myōō, colour on silk 絹本著色愛染明王像 kenpon chakushoku Aizen Myōō zō	Kamakura period	Ikoma	Hōzan-ji			142.1 centimetres (55.9 in) by 87.5 centimetres (34.4 in)	34°41′04″N 135°41′12″E	
Andō En'e, colour on silk 絹本著色安東円恵像 kenpon chakushoku Andō Enne zō	1330	Nara	National Institutes for Cultural Heritage (kept at Nara National Museum)	warlord depicted as a Zen priest		119.5 centimetres (47.0 in) by 57.9 centimetres (22.8 in)	34°40′59″N 135°50′17″E	
Mandala of the One-Syllable Golden Wheel, colour on silk 絹本著色一字金輪曼荼羅図 kenpon chakushoku ichiji kinrin mandara zu	Kamakura period		private					
Mandala of the One-Syllable Golden Wheel, colour on silk 絹本著色一字金輪曼荼羅図 kenpon chakushoku ichiji kinrin mandara zu	Kamakura period	Takatori	Minami Hokke-ji (南法華寺)				34°25′35″N 135°48′35″E	
Mandala of the One-Syllable Golden Wheel, colour on silk 絹本著色一字金輪曼荼羅図 kenpon chakushoku ichiji kinrin mandara zu	Heian period (C12)	Nara	National Institutes for Cultural Heritage (kept at Nara National Museum)	Dainichi Kinrin seated on a lion pedestal with a treasure wheel and the seven treasures of a universal ruler		79.0 centimetres (31.1 in) by 49.5 centimetres (19.5 in)	34°40′59″N 135°50′17″E	
Kashō Daishi, colour on silk Jōei Daishi, colour on silk 絹本著色嘉祥大師像 絹本著色浄影大師像 kenpon chakushoku Kashō Daishi zō kenpon chakushoku Jōei Daishi zō	Kamakura period	Nara	Tōdai-ji				34°41′20″N 135°50′24″E	
Spiritual Teachers of the Kegon Ocean Assembly, colour on silk 絹本著色華厳海会善知識曼荼羅図 kenpon chakushoku Kegon kai-e zenchishiki mandara zu	1294	Nara	Tōdai-ji				34°41′20″N 135°50′24″E	
Kasagi Mandala, colour on silk 絹本著色笠置曼荼羅図 kenpon chakushoku Kasagi mandara zu	Kamakura period	Nara	Kintetsu (kept at the Yamato Bunkakan)				34°41′43″N 135°45′24″E	
Daylilies and Dogs at Play, colour on silk, attributed to Mao Yi 絹本著色萱草遊狗図〈（伝毛益筆）／〉 kenpon chakushoku kanzō yūku zu (den-Mōeki hitsu)	Southern Song	Nara	Kintetsu (kept at the Yamato Bunkakan)			25.3 centimetres (10.0 in) by 25.7 centimetres (10.1 in)	34°41′43″N 135°45′24″E	
Kankyō Jūroku Kansō, colour on silk 絹本著色観経十六観相図 kenpon chakushoku kankyō jūroku kansō zu	Kamakura period	Nara	Amida-ji (阿弥陀寺)				34°40′40″N 135°49′36″E	
Yoshino Mandala, colour on silk 絹本著色吉野曼荼羅図 kenpon chakushoku Yoshino mandara zu	Kamakura period	Nara	Saidai-ji (kept at Nara National Museum)				34°40′59″N 135°50′17″E	
Kokūzō Bosatsu, colour on silk 絹本著色虚空蔵菩薩像 kenpon chakushoku kokūzō bosatsu zō	Kamakura period (C14)	Nara	National Institutes for Cultural Heritage (kept at Nara National Museum)	the cloud arising from the bodhisattva's head and the landscape below are unusual features		77.0 centimetres (30.3 in) by 38.5 centimetres (15.2 in)	34°40′59″N 135°50′17″E	
Nine Grades Raigō, colour on silk 絹本著色九品来迎図 kenpon chakushoku kubon raigō zu	Kamakura period	Shimoichi	Ryujō-ji (滝上寺)	three scrolls			34°21′31″N 135°47′38″E	
Sword with the Dragon Kurikara and Two Child Acolytes, colour on silk Mandala of the Two Realms, colour on silk 絹本著色倶利伽羅竜剣二童子像 絹本著色両界曼荼羅図 kenpon chakushoku Kurikara-ryū ni dōji zō kenpon chakushoku ryōgai mandara zu	Kamakura period	Nara	National Institutes for Cultural Heritage (kept at Nara National Museum)	from Sefuku-ji (施福寺)			34°40′59″N 135°50′17″E	
Kumano Mandala, colour on silk 絹本著色熊野曼荼羅図 kenpon chakushoku Kumano mandara zu	Kamakura period	Nara	Agency for Cultural Affairs (kept at Nara National Museum)			113.8 centimetres (44.8 in) by 50.6 centimetres (19.9 in)	34°40′59″N 135°50′17″E	
Five-Letter Monju, colour on silk 絹本著色五字文殊像 kenpon chakushoku goji Monju zō	1334	Nara	National Institutes for Cultural Heritage (kept at Nara National Museum)	by Shingon priest Monkanbō Kōshin (文観房弘真) (1278-1357)		90.8 centimetres (35.7 in) by 41.6 centimetres (16.4 in)	34°40′59″N 135°50′17″E	
Gohonzon, colour on silk 絹本著色五尊像 kenpon chakushoku goson zō	Kamakura period	Ikaruga	Hōryū-ji				34°36′51″N 135°44′08″E	
Five Great Myōō, colour on silk 絹本著色五大明王像 kenpon chakushoku go dai Myōō zō	Kamakura period	Nara	National Institutes for Cultural Heritage (kept at Nara National Museum)	Fudō in the centre, with Gōzanze to the bottom right (East) and, clockwise, Gundari, Daiitoku, and Kongōyasha		125.5 centimetres (49.4 in) by 86.7 centimetres (34.1 in)	34°40′59″N 135°50′17″E	
Kujaku Myōō, colour on silk 絹本著色五尊像 kenpon chakushoku Kujaku Myōō zō	Heian period	Ikaruga	Hōryū-ji				34°36′51″N 135°44′08″E	
Fazang, colour on silk 絹本著色香象大師像 kenpon chakushoku Kōzō Daishi zō	Kamakura period	Nara	Tōdai-ji				34°41′20″N 135°50′24″E	
Four Saintly Persons, colour on silk 絹本著色四聖御影 kenpon chakushoku shi shō no miei	1256/1377	Nara	Tōdai-ji	key figures in the history of Tōdai-ji: Emperor Shōmu (rear left), Rōben (front left), Bodhisena (rear right), and Gyōki (front right); by Hokkyō Kanjō (法橋観盛) from Mino Province; 1377 copy of the 1256 version pictured			34°41′20″N 135°50′24″E	
Jion Daishi, colour on silk 絹本著色慈恩大師像 kenpon chakushoku Jion Daishi zō	Heian period	Nara	Kōfuku-ji	from the Daijō-in (大乗院)		242.2 centimetres (7 ft 11.4 in) by 124.2 centimetres (4 ft 0.9 in)	34°40′58″N 135°49′56″E	
Jion Daishi, colour on silk 絹本著色慈恩大師像 kenpon chakushoku Jion Daishi zō	Heian period	Nara	Kōfuku-ji	from the Ichijō-in (一乗院); dated by the temple to the Kamakura period		179.5 centimetres (70.7 in) by 80.6 centimetres (31.7 in)	34°40′58″N 135°49′56″E	
Shaka Triad, colour on silk 絹本著色釈迦三尊像 kenpon chakushoku Shaka sanzon zō	Kamakura period (C14)	Nara	National Institutes for Cultural Heritage (kept at Nara National Museum)	three scrolls; Shaka Nyorai flanked by Monju Bosatsu and Fugen Bosatsu, showing strong Chinese influence; from Shōjuraigō-ji (聖衆来迎寺) in Ōtsu		117.0 centimetres (46.1 in) by 58.2 centimetres (22.9 in)	34°40′59″N 135°50′17″E	
Shaka Triad, colour on silk 絹本著色釈迦三尊像（仁王会本尊） kenpon chakushoku Shaka sanzon zō (Ninnō-e honzon)	Kamakura period	Nara	Saidai-ji	Ninno-e honzon			34°41′37″N 135°46′46″E	
Shaka with Eight Great Bodhisattvas, colour on silk 絹本著色釈迦八大菩薩像 kenpon chakushoku Shaka hachi dai bosatsu zō	1320	Yamatokōriyama	Matsuo-dera (松尾寺)	Goryeo Buddhist painting		177.3 centimetres (69.8 in) by 91.2 centimetres (35.9 in)	34°38′03″N 135°43′41″E	
Shaka Preaching at Vulture Peak, colour on silk 絹本著色釈迦霊鷲山説法図 kenpon chakushoku Shaka Ryōjusen seppō	Kamakura period	Nara	National Institutes for Cultural Heritage (kept at Nara National Museum)	with a blue-green landscape setting		157.8 centimetres (62.1 in) by 78.2 centimetres (30.8 in)	34°40′59″N 135°50′17″E	
Jūichimen Kannon, colour on silk 絹本著色十一面観音像 kenpon chakushoku jūichimen Kannon zō	Kamakura period	Nara	Tōdai-ji				34°41′20″N 135°50′24″E	
Ten Kings of Hell, colour on silk, by Riku Shinchū 絹本著色十王図〈陸信忠筆／〉 kenpon chakushoku jūō zu (Riku Shinchū hitsu)	Yuan dynasty	Nara	National Institutes for Cultural Heritage (kept at Nara National Museum)	ten scrolls; alternatively dated to the Southern Song		83.2 centimetres (32.8 in) by 47.0 centimetres (18.5 in)	34°40′59″N 135°50′17″E	
Ten Kings of Hell, colour on silk, by Riku Chūen 絹本著色十王像〈陸忠淵筆／閻羅王、泰山王、五道転輪王〉 kenpon chakushoku jūō zu (Riku Chūen hitsu)	Yuan dynasty	Nara	National Institutes for Cultural Heritage (kept at Nara National Museum)	three scrolls		85.9 centimetres (33.8 in) by 50.8 centimetres (20.0 in)	34°40′59″N 135°50′17″E	
Twelve Devas, colour on silk, by Riku Chūen 絹本著色十二天像 kenpon chakushoku jūniten zō	Kamakura period	Nara	National Institutes for Cultural Heritage (kept at Nara National Museum)	twelve scrolls; Bonten pictured		122.7 centimetres (48.3 in) by 41.8 centimetres (16.5 in)	34°40′59″N 135°50′17″E	
Sixteen Arhats, colour on silk 絹本著色十六羅漢像 kenpon chakushoku jūroku rakan zō	Kamakura period	Nara	Tōshōdai-ji				34°40′32″N 135°47′05″E	
Sixteen Arhats, colour on silk, eight-panel byōbu 絹本著色十六羅漢像 〈／八曲屏〉 kenpon chakushoku jūroku rakan zō	Kamakura period	Ikaruga	Hōryū-ji	pair of screens			34°36′52″N 135°44′14″E	
Kasuga Mandala, colour on silk 絹本著色春日曼荼羅図 kenpon chakushoku Kasuga mandara zu	Kamakura period	Sakurai	Nōman-in				34°32′12″N 135°54′27″E	
Kasuga Mandala, colour on silk 絹本著色春日曼荼羅図 kenpon chakushoku Kasuga mandara zu	Nanboku-chō period	Ikoma	Hōzan-ji			122.7 centimetres (48.3 in) by 54.3 centimetres (21.4 in)	34°41′04″N 135°41′12″E	
Pure Land Mandala, colour on silk 絹本著色浄土曼荼羅図 kenpon chakushoku jōdo mandara zu	Kamakura period	Sakurai	Hase-dera				34°32′09″N 135°54′25″E	
Pure Land Mandala, colour on silk 絹本著色浄土曼荼羅図 〈（伝清海曼荼羅）／〉 kenpon chakushoku jōdo mandara zu (den-Seikai mandara)	Heian period (C12)	Nara	National Institutes for Cultural Heritage (kept at Nara National Museum)	formerly identified known as the Seikai Mandala		162.1 centimetres (63.8 in) by 134.0 centimetres (52.8 in)	34°40′59″N 135°50′17″E	
Shinran Shōnin, colour on silk 絹本著色親鸞聖人像 kenpon chakushoku Shinran Shōnin zō	Nanboku-chō period	Nara	National Institutes for Cultural Heritage (kept at Nara National Museum)	in the top right corner is the poem 行者宿報設女犯 我成玉女身被犯 一生之間能莊嚴 臨終引導生極樂 and at the end of the scroll the inscription 信房御影［四句文尊円親王／繪浄賀法橋］naming the painter as Jōga (1275-1356); from Jōfuku-ji (常福寺) in Kyoto		120.2 centimetres (47.3 in) by 81.1 centimetres (31.9 in)	34°40′59″N 135°50′17″E	
Star Mandala, colour on silk 絹本著色星曼荼羅図 kenpon chakushoku hoshi mandara zu	Heian period	Ikaruga	Hōryū-ji				34°36′52″N 135°44′14″E	
Star Mandala, colour on silk 絹本著色星曼荼羅図 kenpon chakushoku hoshi mandara zu	Heian period	Ikaruga	Hōryū-ji				34°36′52″N 135°44′14″E	
Ikoma Mandala, colour on silk 絹本著色生駒曼荼羅図 kenpon chakushoku Ikoma mandara zu	Kamakura period	Nara	National Institutes for Cultural Heritage (kept at Nara National Museum)	depicting seven Buddhas above Ikoma Jinja, an example of the honji suijaku paradigm		105.3 centimetres (41.5 in) by 41.9 centimetres (16.5 in)	34°40′59″N 135°50′17″E	
Shōkō Mandala, colour on silk, by Gyōson 絹本著色聖皇曼荼羅図〈尭尊筆／〉 kenpon chakushoku Shōkō mandara zu (Gyōson hitsu)	1255	Ikaruga	Hōryū-ji				34°36′52″N 135°44′14″E	
Descent of the Heavenly Multitude, colour on silk 絹本著色聖衆来迎図 kenpon chakushoku shōjū raigō zu	Kamakura period	Kashiba	Anichi-ji (阿日寺)			95.0 centimetres (37.4 in) by 53.8 centimetres (21.2 in)	34°31′57″N 135°42′22″E	
Shōtoku Taishi Lecturing on the Shoman-kyō, colour on silk 絹本著色聖徳太子勝鬘経講讃図 kenpon chakushoku Shōtoku Taishi Shōman-kyō kōsan zu	Kamakura period (C13)	Ikaruga	Hōryū-ji			210.5 centimetres (82.9 in) by 177.4 centimetres (69.8 in)	34°36′52″N 135°44′14″E	
Shōtoku Taishi, colour on silk 絹本著色聖徳太子像 kenpon chakushoku Shōtoku Taishi zō	Kamakura period	Ikaruga	Hōryū-ji				34°36′52″N 135°44′14″E	
Senju Kannon, colour on silk 絹本著色千手観音像 kenpon chakushoku Senju Kannon zō	Kamakura period (C14)	Nara	National Institutes for Cultural Heritage (kept at Nara National Museum)	at the bottom of the image a dragon holding a sacred jewel rises from the waters		100.8 centimetres (39.7 in) by 41.0 centimetres (16.1 in)	34°40′59″N 135°50′17″E	
Senju Sengen Kannon, colour on silk 絹本著色千手千眼観音像 kenpon chakushoku Senju Sengen Kannon zō	Kamakura period	Yoshino	Kimpusen-ji				34°22′07″N 135°51′29″E	
Sonshō Mandala, colour on silk 絹本著色尊勝曼荼羅図 kenpon chakushoku sonshō mandara zu	Kamakura period	Nara	National Institutes for Cultural Heritage (kept at Nara National Museum)	from Myōō-in (明星院)		133.8 centimetres (52.7 in) by 82.3 centimetres (32.4 in)	34°40′59″N 135°50′17″E	
Pictorial Biography of Shōtoku Taishi, colour on silk, attributed to Tosa Mitsunobu 絹本著色太子絵伝〈（伝土佐光信筆）／〉 kenpon chakushoku Taishi e-den (den-Tosa Mitsunobu hitsu)	Muromachi period	Asuka	Tachibana-dera	eight scrolls			34°28′12″N 135°49′03″E	
Daiitoku Myōō, colour on silk 絹本著色大威徳明王像 kenpon chakushoku Daiitoku Myōō zō	Heian period	Sakurai	Tanzan Jinja				34°27′57″N 135°51′42″E	
Daiitoku Myōō, colour on silk 絹本著色大威徳明王像 kenpon chakushoku Daiitoku Myōō zō	Kamakura period	Nara	Tōshōdai-ji				34°40′32″N 135°47′05″E	
Daibutchō Mandala, colour on silk 絹本著色大仏頂曼荼羅図 kenpon chakushoku Daibutchō mandara zu	Heian period (C12)	Nara	National Institutes for Cultural Heritage (kept at Nara National Museum)	devotional use of the Daibutchō mandala seems to have begun in the eleventh century		125.5 centimetres (49.4 in) by 88.5 centimetres (34.8 in)	34°40′59″N 135°50′17″E	
Jizō and the Ten Kings of Hell, colour on silk 絹本著色地蔵十王像 kenpon chakushoku Jizō jūō zō	Kamakura period	Sakurai	Hase-dera				34°32′09″N 135°54′25″E	
Jizō Bosatsu, colour on silk 絹本著色地蔵菩薩像 kenpon chakushoku Jizō Bosatsu zō	Kamakura period (C13)	Nara	National Institutes for Cultural Heritage (kept at Nara National Museum)	with a shakujō in his right hand and hōju or sacred gem in his left, standing upon a lotus pedestal atop a flying cloud		101.0 centimetres (39.8 in) by 36.3 centimetres (14.3 in)	34°40′59″N 135°50′17″E	
Jizō Bosatsu, colour on silk 絹本著色地蔵菩薩像 kenpon chakushoku Jizō Bosatsu zō	Kamakura period (C14)	Nara	National Institutes for Cultural Heritage (kept at Nara National Museum)	with a landscape background; from Chuzō-in (中蔵院) in Tamano, Okayama		92.1 centimetres (36.3 in) by 38.1 centimetres (15.0 in)	34°40′59″N 135°50′17″E	
Nakamura Kuranosuke, colour on silk, by Ogata Kōrin 絹本著色中村内蔵助像〈尾形光琳筆／〉 kenpon chakushoku Nakamura Kuranosuke zō (Ogata Kōrin hitsu)	Edo period	Nara	Kintetsu (kept at the Yamato Bunkakan)	with poetic inscriptions dated to 1704			34°41′43″N 135°45′24″E	
So-called Kakinomoto Miya Mandala, colour on silk 絹本著色伝柿本曼荼羅図 kenpon chakushoku den-Kakinomoto Miya mandara zu	Kamakura period	Nara	Kintetsu (kept at the Yamato Bunkakan)	designation includes a related document dating to 1476			34°41′43″N 135°45′24″E	
Legends of the Taima Mandala, colour on silk 絹本著色当麻曼荼羅縁起 kenpon chakushoku Chūjō-hime zō	Nanboku-chō period	Katsuragi	Taima-dera	pair of scrolls			34°30′58″N 135°41′40″E	
Daoxuan, colour on silk 絹本著色道宣律師像 kenpon chakushoku Dōsen Risshi zō	Kamakura period (C14)	Nara	National Institutes for Cultural Heritage (kept at Nara National Museum)	wearing a black kesa		112.5 centimetres (44.3 in) by 56.2 centimetres (22.1 in)	34°40′59″N 135°50′17″E	
White Path between Two Rivers, colour on silk 絹本著色二河白道図 kenpon chakushoku niga byakudō zu	Kamakura period (C14)	Nara	National Institutes for Cultural Heritage (kept at Nara National Museum)	a Pure Land allegory		71.0 centimetres (28.0 in) by 26.3 centimetres (10.4 in)	34°40′59″N 135°50′17″E	
Two Heavenly Kings, colour on silk 絹本著色二天王像 kenpon chakushoku ni tennō zō	Kamakura period	Nara	Kōfuku-ji	Jikoku-ten pictured and Zōchō-ten		135.5 centimetres (53.3 in) by 96.0 centimetres (37.8 in)	34°40′58″N 135°49′56″E	
Hiei Sannō Miya Mandala, colour on silk 絹本著色日吉山王宮曼荼羅図 kenpon chakushoku Hie Sannō miya mandara zu	Nanboku-chō period	Nara	National Institutes for Cultural Heritage (kept at Nara National Museum)	with the twenty-one enshrined kami, and corresponding honjibutsu and seed syllables above		120.7 centimetres (47.5 in) by 68.1 centimetres (26.8 in)	34°40′59″N 135°50′17″E	
Hiei Sannō Miya Mandala, colour on silk 絹本著色日吉山王宮曼荼羅図 kenpon chakushoku Hie Sannō miya mandara zu	Kamakura period	Nara	Kintetsu (kept at the Yamato Bunkakan)				34°41′43″N 135°45′24″E	
Nyoirin Kannon, colour on silk 絹本著色如意輪観音像 kenpon chakushoku Nyoirin Kannon zō	late Kamakura period	Nara	National Institutes for Cultural Heritage (kept at Nara National Museum)	with six arms and a gold body, as described in the Kanjizai Nyoi Bosatsu Yuga Hōyō (観自在菩薩如意輪瑜伽法要)		101.7 centimetres (40.0 in) by 41.6 centimetres (16.4 in)	34°40′59″N 135°50′17″E	
White-Robed Kannon, colour on silk 絹本著色白衣観音図 kenpon chakushoku Byakue Kannon zu	1377	Nara	National Institutes for Cultural Heritage (kept at Nara National Museum)	white-robed and seated on a grass-covered rock; according to the fifth chapter of the Mahavairocana Sutra, the white is the "whiteness of the pure aspiration of enlightenment"; ink inscription in the upper right corner: 稽首淨聖甘露除焔 | 眞大依怙普施福縁 | 丁巳仲夏 | 壽峯海燁謹題; stylistic considerations date 丁巳 (Yin Fire Snake according to the Sexagenary cycle) to 1377; of Goryeo, Yuan or Ming origin		99.1 centimetres (39.0 in) by 40.3 centimetres (15.9 in)	34°40′59″N 135°50′17″E	
Bishamon-ten, colour on silk 絹本著色毘沙門天像 kenpon chakushoku Bishamon-ten zō	Kamakura period	Nara	Kairyūō-ji (海龍王寺)				34°41′34″N 135°48′20″E	
Bishamon-ten, colour on silk 絹本著色毘沙門天像 kenpon chakushoku Bishamon-ten zō	Kamakura period	Ikaruga	Hōryū-ji				34°36′52″N 135°44′14″E	
Fudō Myōō and Eight Child Acolytes, colour on silk 絹本著色不動明王八大童子像 kenpon chakushoku Fudō Myōō hachidai dō zō	Kamakura period	Nara	National Institutes for Cultural Heritage (kept at Nara National Museum)	from Shakamon-in (釈迦文院) on Mount Kōya		129.6 centimetres (51.0 in) by 89.3 centimetres (35.2 in)	34°40′59″N 135°50′17″E	
Fugen Enmei, colour on silk 絹本著色普賢延命像 kenpon chakushoku Fugen Enmei zō	Kamakura period	Nara	National Institutes for Cultural Heritage (kept at Nara National Museum)	from Shōren-in in Kyoto		91.3 centimetres (35.9 in) by 41.9 centimetres (16.5 in)	34°40′59″N 135°50′17″E	
Fugen and the Ten Rasetsunyō, colour on silk 絹本著色普賢十羅刹女像 kenpon chakushoku Fugen jū rasetsunyō zō	Kamakura period	Nara	National Institutes for Cultural Heritage (kept at Nara National Museum)	the Rasetsunyō wear jūnihitoe		112.0 centimetres (44.1 in) by 55.0 centimetres (21.7 in)	34°40′59″N 135°50′17″E	
Fugen Bosatsu, colour on silk 絹本著色普賢菩薩像 kenpon chakushoku Fugen Bosatsu zō	Heian period (C12)	Nara	National Institutes for Cultural Heritage (kept at Nara National Museum)	the episode where Fugen appears on a white elephant to protect the followers of the Lotus Sutra is from its Fugen Bosatsu kanhotsu hon (普賢菩薩勧発品)		62.0 centimetres (24.4 in) by 30.7 centimetres (12.1 in)	34°40′59″N 135°50′17″E	
Buddha’s Parinirvana, colour on silk 絹本著色仏涅槃図 kenpon chakushoku Butsu nehan zu	Heian period	Uda	Sōyū-ji (宗祐寺)	three scrolls			34°31′54″N 135°57′32″E	
Buddha’s Parinirvana, colour on silk 絹本著色仏涅槃図 kenpon chakushoku Butsu nehan zu	Heian period	Nara	Shin-Yakushi-ji				34°40′33″N 135°50′46″E	
Buddha’s Parinirvana, colour on silk 絹本著色仏涅槃図 kenpon chakushoku Butsu nehan zu	Yuan dynasty	Nara	National Institutes for Cultural Heritage (kept at Nara National Museum)	by Riku Shinchū (陸信忠); alternatively dated to the Southern Song		157.1 centimetres (61.9 in) by 82.9 centimetres (32.6 in)	34°40′59″N 135°50′17″E	
Monju Bosatsu, colour on silk 絹本著色文殊菩薩像 kenpon chakushoku Monju Bosatsu zō	1302	Nara	Saidai-ji				34°41′37″N 135°46′46″E	
Hokke Mandala, colour on silk 絹本著色法華曼荼羅図 kenpon chakushoku Hokke mandara zu	Kamakura period	Nara	Tōshōdai-ji			122.3 centimetres (48.1 in) by 86.2 centimetres (33.9 in)	34°40′32″N 135°47′05″E	
Hokke Mandala, colour on silk 絹本著色法華曼荼羅図 kenpon chakushoku Hokke mandara zu	Heian period	Ikaruga	Hōryū-ji				34°36′52″N 135°44′14″E	
Musō Soseki, colour on silk Mukyoku Shigen, colour on silk 絹本著色夢窓疎石像 絹本著色無極志玄像 kenpon chakushoku Musō Soseki zō kenpon chakushoku Mukyoku Shigen zō	Nanboku-chō period		Jissai-in (慈済院)			112.3 centimetres (44.2 in) by 56.3 centimetres (22.2 in), 115.3 centimetres (45.4 in) by 61.1 centimetres (24.1 in)		
Myōkū, colour on silk 絹本著色明空法師像 kenpon chakushoku Myōkū hōshi zō	Kamakura period	Nara	National Institutes for Cultural Heritage (kept at Nara National Museum)	from Busshin-ji (仏心寺) in Shiga Prefecture		168.5 centimetres (66.3 in) by 100.2 centimetres (39.4 in)	34°40′59″N 135°50′17″E	
Miroku Bosatsu, colour on silk 絹本著色弥勒菩薩像 kenpon chakushoku Miroku bosatsu zō	Kamakura period	Ikoma	Hōzan-ji			164.2 centimetres (64.6 in) by 88.8 centimetres (35.0 in)	34°41′04″N 135°41′12″E	
Legends of Yata Jizō, colour on silk 絹本著色矢田地蔵縁起 kenpon chakushoku Yata Jizō engi	Kamakura period	Yamatokōriyama	Kongōsen-ji (金剛山寺)	pair of scrolls			34°41′04″N 135°41′12″E	
Illustrated Legends of Yūzū Nenbutsu, colour on paper 紙本著色融通念仏縁起絵 shihon chakushoku yūzū nenbutsu engi-e	Kamakura period	Tawaramoto	Anraku-ji (安楽寺)				34°32′37″N 135°46′51″E	
Mandala of the Two Realms, colour on silk 絹本著色両界曼荼羅図〈厨子入／〉 kenpon chakushoku ryōgai mandara zu (zushi iri)	Kamakura period	Nara	National Institutes for Cultural Heritage (kept at Nara National Museum)	two paintings inside a portable shrine with doors to front and rear; from Shōjuraigō-ji (聖衆来迎寺) in Ōtsu		18.3 centimetres (7.2 in) by 18.5 centimetres (7.3 in)	34°40′59″N 135°50′17″E	
Lotus Pond, colour on silk, two-panel byōbu 絹本著色蓮池図〈（旧舎利殿須弥壇後壁貼付）／二曲屏風〉 kenpon chakushoku renchi zu	Kamakura period	Ikaruga	Hōryū-ji	from the real wall of the shumidan (altar) in the Shariden			34°36′52″N 135°44′14″E	
Shishū Daishi, colour on silk 絹本著色泗州大師像 kenpon chakushoku Shishū Daishi zō	Kamakura period	Nara	Kōfuku-ji			149.0 centimetres (58.7 in) by 124.2 centimetres (48.9 in)	34°40′58″N 135°49′56″E	
Buddha’s Parinirvana, colour on silk 絹本著色涅槃図 kenpon chakushoku nehan zu	Heian period	Ōji	Daruma-ji (達磨寺)				34°35′23″N 135°42′25″E	
Hollyhocks and Cats at Play, colour on silk, attributed to Mao Yi 絹本著色蜀葵遊猫図〈（伝毛益筆）／〉 kenpon chakushoku shokki yūbyō zu (den-Mōeki hitsu)	Southern Song	Nara	Kintetsu (kept at the Yamato Bunkakan)			25.3 centimetres (10.0 in) by 25.8 centimetres (10.2 in)	34°41′43″N 135°45′24″E	
Water Moon Kannon, colour on silk 絹本墨画水月観音像 kenpon chakushoku suigetsu Kannon zō	Nanboku-chō period	Nara	National Institutes for Cultural Heritage (kept at Nara National Museum)	with poetic inscription by Tennan Myōju (天庵妙受)		88.0 centimetres (34.6 in) by 36.7 centimetres (14.4 in)	34°40′59″N 135°50′17″E	
Landscape, ink and light colour on silk 絹本墨画淡彩山水図〈伝趙大年筆／〉 kenpon bokuga tansai sansui zu	Southern Song	Nara	Kintetsu (kept at the Yamato Bunkakan)				34°41′43″N 135°45′24″E	
White-Robed Kannon, ink on silk 絹本墨画白衣観音図 kenpon bokuga Byakue Kannon zu	Kamakura period	Nara	National Institutes for Cultural Heritage (kept at Nara National Museum)	the willow in a vase and water under a rock are iconographically similar to the Yōryū (Willow) Kannon and Suigetsu (Water Moon) Kannon		100.3 centimetres (39.5 in) by 41.4 centimetres (16.3 in)	34°40′59″N 135°50′17″E	
Wall paintings of the Hōryū-ji Five-Storey Pagoda 五重塔初層旧壁画（土壁） gojū-no-tō shosō kyū-hekiga	Nara period	Ikaruga	Hōryū-ji	18 panels on earthen render			34°36′52″N 135°44′14″E	
Defenders of the Law, door paintings 護法善神図絵扉; Gohō zenshin zue tobira	Kamakura period	Nara	Kōfuku-ji	from a six-sided miniature shrine (厨子)		88.4 centimetres (34.8 in) by 30.2 centimetres (11.9 in)	34°40′58″N 135°49′56″E	
Lotus Sutra Hōtō Mandala, gold and silver paint on blue paper 紺紙金銀泥法華経宝塔曼荼羅図〈（開結共）／〉 konshi kingin dei Hokke-kyō hōtō mandara zu	Heian period	Sakurai	Tanzan Jinja	ten scrolls			34°27′57″N 135°51′42″E	
Fine Ox, light colour on paper 紙本淡彩駿牛図断簡 shihon tansai sungyū zu dankan	Kamakura period		private					
Matamata Ichiraku jō, light colour on paper, by Tanomura Chikuden 紙本淡彩亦復一楽帖〈田能村竹田筆／〉 shihon Matamata Ichiraku jō (Tanomura Chikuden hitsu)	1831	Nara	Neiraku Museum	one album			34°41′10″N 135°50′14″E	
Ippen Shōnin, light colour on paper 紙本著色一遍上人絵巻 shihon chakushoku Ippen Shōnin emaki	Kamakura period		private	four scrolls				
Sudhana's Pilgrimage to Fifty-five Spiritual Teachers as described in the Flower Garland Sutra, colour on paper 紙本著色華厳五十五所絵 shihon chakushoku kegon gojūgosho e	Heian period	Nara	Tōdai-ji	ten scrolls			34°41′20″N 135°50′24″E	
Sudhana's Pilgrimage to Fifty-five Spiritual Teachers as described in the Flower Garland Sutra, colour on paper 紙本著色華厳五十五所絵 shihon chakushoku kegon gojūgosho e	Heian period	Nara	National Institutes for Cultural Heritage (kept at Nara National Museum)	one scroll; part of a set dispersed across Tōdai-ji, the Nezu Museum, and the Fujita Art Museum		74.7 centimetres (29.4 in) by 44.7 centimetres (17.6 in)	34°40′59″N 135°50′17″E	
Illustrated Sutra of Cause and Effect, colour on paper 紙本著色絵因果経断簡〈巻第二上／（六十二行）〉 shihon chakushoku e-inga-kyō dankan	Nara period	Nara	National Institutes for Cultural Heritage (kept at Nara National Museum)	one scroll		16.4 centimetres (6.5 in) by 115.9 centimetres (45.6 in)	34°40′59″N 135°50′17″E	
Thirty-Six Immortals of Poetry, colour on paper (Kodai no Kimi) 紙本著色三十六歌仙切〈（小大君）／佐竹家伝来〉 shihon chakushoku sanjūrokkasen setsu (Koōkimi / Satake-ke denrai)	Kamakura period	Nara	Kintetsu (kept at the Yamato Bunkakan)	one scroll from the Satake Family Collection			34°41′43″N 135°45′24″E	
Ten Spiritual Realms, colour on paper, six-panel byōbu 紙本著色十界図〈／六曲屏風〉 shihon chakushoku jikkai zu (rokkyoku byōbu)	Muromachi period	Katsuragi	Oku-no-in	pair of screens			34°31′00″N 135°41′37″E	
Five Pure Land Patriarchs, colour on paper 紙本著色浄土五祖絵〈（曇鸞巻、善導巻）／〉 shihon chakushoku jōdo goso-e	Nanboku-chō period		private	Donran and Zendō				
Sesson, self-portrait, colour on silk 紙本著色雪村自画像 shihon chakushoku Sesson jigazō	Muromachi period	Nara	Kintetsu (kept at the Yamato Bunkakan)				34°41′43″N 135°45′24″E	
Sutra fan, colour on paper 紙本著色扇面古写経 shihon chakushoku senmen koshakyō	Heian period	Ikaruga	Hōryū-ji				34°36′52″N 135°44′14″E	
Hell of Boiling Excrement, colour on paper 紙本著色地獄草紙断簡（沸屎地獄） shihon chakushoku jigoku zōshi dankan (Fusshi Jikoku)	late Heian period	Nara	National Institutes for Cultural Heritage (kept at Nara National Museum)	one scroll		26.3 centimetres (10.4 in) by 104.4 centimetres (41.1 in)	34°40′59″N 135°50′17″E	
The Eastern Journeys of Ganjin, colour on paper, by Rengyō 紙本著色東征絵巻〈蓮行筆／〉 shihon chakushoku tōsei emaki (Rengyō hitsu)	1298	Nara	Tōshōdai-ji	five handscrolls			34°40′32″N 135°47′05″E	
Legends of the Tōdai-ji Daibutsu, colour on paper 紙本著色東大寺大仏縁起〈芝琳賢筆／〉 shihon chakushoku Tōdaiji daibutsu engi (Shiba Rinken hitsu)	1536	Nara	Tōdai-ji	three scrolls			34°41′20″N 135°50′24″E	
Legends of Taima-dera, colour on paper 紙本著色当麻寺縁起 shihon chakushoku Taima-dera engi	1629		private	three scrolls				
Legends of Taima-dera, colour on paper, by Tosa Mitsumochi 紙本著色当麻寺縁起〈絵土佐光茂筆／詞後奈良天皇等九筆〉 shihon chakushoku Taima-dera engi (e Tosa Mitsumochi hitsu / shi Go-Nara tennō tō kyū hitsu〉	1531	Katsuragi	Taima-dera	with poetic text in the hand of Emperor Go-Nara among others			34°30′58″N 135°41′40″E	
Portrait of a Lady, colour on silk 紙本著色婦人像 shihon chakushoku fujin zō	Momoyama period	Nara	Kintetsu (kept at the Yamato Bunkakan)				34°41′43″N 135°45′24″E	
Deeds of Hōnen, colour on paper, emaki 紙本著色法然上人行状絵巻 shihon chakushoku Hōnen jōnin gyōjō emaki	Kamakura period	Katsuragi	Oku-no-in	forty-eight scrolls			34°31′00″N 135°41′37″E	
Aristocratic Gathering in Kempo 6, monochrome ink on paper 紙本白描建保六年中殿御会図 hakubyō Kenpo rokunen chūden gyokai zu	Muromachi period		private					
Genji Monogatari (Ukifune scroll), monochrome ink on paper 紙本白描源氏物語絵（浮舟巻残巻） shihon hakubyō Genji monogatari e (Ukifune maki zankan)	Kamakura period	Nara	Kintetsu (kept at the Yamato Bunkakan)	one fragmentary scroll bound in a book			34°41′43″N 135°45′24″E	
Iconographic Drawings of the Takao Mandala, monochrome ink on paper 紙本白描高雄曼荼羅図像（胎蔵界巻第一、三、四、五 金剛界巻第一、二） shihon hakubyō Takao mandara zuzō	Heian period	Sakurai	Hase-dera	six scrolls (Diamond Realm scrolls 1, 2; Womb Realm scrolls 1, 3, 4, 5)			34°32′09″N 135°54′25″E	
Iconographic Drawings of Kannon, monochrome ink on paper 紙本白描諸観音図像 shihon hakubyō sho Kannon zuzō	Heian period	Nara	National Institutes for Cultural Heritage (kept at Nara National Museum)	contains six forms of Kannon (Shō Kannon, Senju Kannon, Batō Kannon, Fukukenjaku Kannon, Byakue Kannon, and Nyoirin Kannon)		30.3 centimetres (11.9 in) by 1,064.3 centimetres (34 ft 11.0 in)	34°40′59″N 135°50′17″E	
Drawings of door paintings from the Tōdai-ji Kaidan-in, monochrome ink on paper 紙本白描東大寺戒壇院扉絵図 shihon hakubyō Tōdaiji Kaidan-in tobira-e zu	C12	Nara	National Institutes for Cultural Heritage (kept at Nara National Museum)	thought to be a copy of the paintings on the doors of a portable shrine (厨子) dedicated in 755 and lost to the fires of 1180		28.9 centimetres (11.4 in) by 1,114.0 centimetres (36 ft 6.6 in)	34°40′59″N 135°50′17″E	
Iconographic Drawings of Fudō Myōō, monochrome ink on paper 紙本白描不動明王図像 shihon hakubyō Fudō Myōō zuzō	1245	Nara	National Institutes for Cultural Heritage (kept at Nara National Museum)	includes images of Fudō Myōō, his acolytes, and his avatars		30.5 centimetres (12.0 in) by 1,232.6 centimetres (40 ft 5.3 in)	34°40′59″N 135°50′17″E	
Vimalakirti, colour on paper, by Bunsei 紙本墨画維摩居士像〈文清筆／長禄元年祖黙賛〉 shihon chakushoku Yuima Kōji zō (Bunsei hitsu)	1457	Nara	Kintetsu (kept at the Yamato Bunkakan)				34°41′43″N 135°45′24″E	
Flowers and Birds, ink on paper, six-fold byōbu, by Sesson 紙本墨画花鳥図〈雪村筆／六曲屏風〉 shihon bokuga kachō zu (Sesson hitsu rokkyoku byōbu)	C16	Nara	Kintetsu (kept at the Yamato Bunkakan)	pair of screens			34°41′43″N 135°45′24″E	
Landscape, ink on paper, six-fold byōbu 紙本墨画山水図〈／六曲屏風〉 shihon bokuga sansui zu (rokkyoku byōbu)	Muromachi period	Nara	Kintetsu (kept at the Yamato Bunkakan)	pair of screens			34°41′43″N 135°45′24″E	
Iconographic Drawings of the Womb Realm, ink on paper 紙本墨画胎蔵図像（智証大師本） shihon bokuga Taizō zuzō	1194	Nara	National Institutes for Cultural Heritage (kept at Nara National Museum)	pair of scrolls by Zenkaku (禅覚)		30.3 centimetres (11.9 in) by 1,409.7 centimetres (46 ft 3.0 in), 30.3 centimetres (11.9 in) by 1,333.0 centimetres (43 ft 8.8 in)	34°40′59″N 135°50′17″E	
Daidō Ichii, ink on paper 紙本墨画大道和尚図〈伝明兆筆／〉 shihon bokuga Daidō oshō zu (den-Minchō hitsu)	1394	Nara	National Institutes for Cultural Heritage (kept at Nara National Museum)	attributed to Kichizan Minchō (吉山明兆)		47.0 centimetres (18.5 in) by 16.2 centimetres (6.4 in)	34°40′59″N 135°50′17″E	
Bamboo with a Sparrow, ink on paper 紙本墨画竹雀図 shihon bokuga chikujaku zu	Nanboku-chō period	Nara	Kintetsu (kept at the Yamato Bunkakan)				34°41′43″N 135°45′24″E	
Lü Dongbin, ink on paper, by Sesson 紙本墨画呂洞賓図〈雪村筆／〉 shihon bokuga Ryo Dōhin zu (Sesson hitsu)	C16	Nara	Kintetsu (kept at the Yamato Bunkakan)				34°41′43″N 135°45′24″E	
Jūichimen Kannon 十一面向観音像（三十三身） jūichimen muki kannon-zō (sanjūsan-shin)	Kamakura period	Sakurai	Nōman-in				34°32′12″N 135°54′27″E	
Pure Land Mandala, colour on silk 浄土曼荼羅絹本著色掛幅〈（伝法橋慶舜筆）／〉 jōdo mandara kenpon chakushoku kakefuku (den-hokkyō keishun hitsu)	Muromachi period	Katsuragi	Taima-dera				34°30′58″N 135°41′40″E	
Chikō Mandala, colour on wooden boards 著色智光曼荼羅図〈／（板絵）〉 chakushoku Chikō mandara zu (ita-e)	Kamakura period	Nara	Gangō-ji			217.0 centimetres (85.4 in) by 195.0 centimetres (76.8 in)	34°40′40″N 135°49′53″E	
Decorative Paintings of the Octagonal Hall, colour on wooden boards 八角堂内陣装飾画（板絵著色） hakkakudō naijin sōshoku ga (ita-e chakushoku)	Heian period	Gojō	Eizan-ji (栄山寺)				34°21′21″N 135°43′14″E	
Boats reaching port, colour on wooden boards 板絵著色廻船入港図額 ita-e chakushoku kaisen nyūkō zu gaku	1661	Yoshino	Kimpusen-ji				34°22′07″N 135°51′29″E	
Shoson Mandala, colour on wooden boards 板絵著色諸尊曼荼羅図 ita-e chakushoku shoson mandara zu	Heian period	Katsuragi	Taima-dera	two panels			34°30′58″N 135°41′40″E	
Images of Kami, colour on wooden boards 板絵著色神像〈永仁三年三月尭儼筆／〉 ita-e chakushoku shinzō	1295	Nara	Yakushi-ji	six panels			34°40′06″N 135°47′04″E	
Senju Kannon, colour on silk 絹本著色千手観音像（像内納入品） kenpon chakushoku Senju Kannon zō	Heian period (C12)	Nara	National Institutes for Cultural Heritage (kept at Nara National Museum)	found inside a 53 cm high wooden statue of Kannon		93.8 centimetres (36.9 in) by 39.5 centimetres (15.6 in)	34°40′59″N 135°50′17″E	
Kasuga Shrine Mandala 春日宮曼荼羅図; Kasuga Miya mandara zu	Kamakura period							

== Prefectural Cultural Properties ==
As of 1 April 2018, forty-three properties have been designated at a prefectural level.

Property	Date	Municipality	Ownership	Comments	Image	Dimensions	Coordinates	Ref.
Pure Land of Amida, colour on silk 絹本著色阿弥陀浄土図(伝智光曼荼羅) kenpon chakushoku Amida jōdo zu (den-Chikō mandara)	Muromachi period	Nara	Gangō-ji				34°40′40″N 135°49′53″E	for all refs see
Mandala of the Two Realms, gold paint on indigo paper 紺紙金泥両界曼荼羅図 konshi kindei ryōkai mandara zu	Kamakura period	Nara	Saidai-ji (kept at Nara National Museum)				34°40′59″N 135°50′17″E	
Shaka Triad with Sixteen Benevolent Deities, colour on silk 絹本著色釈迦三尊十六善神図 kenpon chakushoku Shaka sanzon jūroku zenjin zu	Kamakura period	Nara	Saidai-ji (kept at Nara National Museum)				34°40′59″N 135°50′17″E	
Yakushi and the Twelve Heavenly Generals, colour on silk 絹本著色薬師十二神将像 kenpon chakushoku Yakushi jūni shinshō zō	Kamakura period	Nara	Tōshōdai-ji				34°40′32″N 135°47′05″E	
Nigatsu-dō Mandala 二月堂曼荼羅図; Nigatsudō mandara zu	Muromachi period	Nara	Tōdai-ji				34°41′21″N 135°50′39″E	
Legends of Tōdai-ji, colour on silk 絹本著色東大寺縁起図 kenpon chakushoku Tōdaiji engi zu	Kamakura period	Nara	Tōdai-ji	pair of scrolls			34°41′21″N 135°50′39″E	
Buddha's Parinirvana, colour on silk 絹本著色仏涅槃図 kenpon chakushoku Butsu nehan zu	Kamakura period	Nara	Shōryaku-ji				34°38′41″N 135°52′06″E	
Ise Mandala, ink and light colour on paper 紙本墨画淡彩伊勢曼荼羅図 shihon bokuga tansai Ise mandara zu	Nanboku-chō period	Nara	Shōryaku-ji				34°38′41″N 135°52′06″E	
Yakushi and the Twelve Heavenly Generals, colour on silk 絹本著色薬師十二神将像 kenpon chakushoku Yakushi jūni shinshō zō	Kamakura period	Nara	Yakushi-ji				34°40′07″N 135°47′04″E	
Hossō Mandala, colour on silk 絹本著色法相曼荼羅図 kenpon chakushoku Hossō mandara zu	Nanboku-chō period	Nara	Kōfuku-ji			126.5 centimetres (49.8 in) by 79.4 centimetres (31.3 in)	34°40′58″N 135°49′56″E	
Kasuga Shrine and Temple Mandala, colour on silk 絹本著色春日社寺曼荼羅図 kenpon chakushoku Kasuga shaji mandara zu	Kamakura period	Nara	Kōfuku-ji			116.0 centimetres (45.7 in) by 42.5 centimetres (16.7 in)	34°40′58″N 135°49′56″E	
Horse Race, colour on paper, six-fold byōbu 紙本著色競馬図 六曲屏風 shihon chakushoku kurabe-uma zu (rokkyoku byōbu)	Muromachi period	Nara	Kasuga Taisha				34°40′53″N 135°50′54″E	
Kasuga Deities Departing from Kashima Shrine, colour on silk 絹本著色鹿島立神影図 kenpon chakushoku Kashima-tachi shin-ei zu	1383	Nara	Kasuga Taisha	when designated as a municipal property the designation included the wooden rod or jikugi around which the bottom of the hanging scroll was wound, until its removal during restoration work in 1891, and which bears an ink inscription naming the artist - Nijō Eiin - and dating the work to the 30th day of the 9th month of Eitoku 3: 永徳三年九月三十日 八月十三日春日ハシラタテノ日筆ハシメナリ 二條英印筆		107.1 centimetres (42.2 in) by 36.2 centimetres (14.3 in)	34°40′53″N 135°50′54″E	
A Beauty, by Soga Shōhaku, colour on silk 絹本著色美人図 曾我蕭白筆 kenpon chakushoku bijin zu Soga Shōhaku hitsu	C18	Nara	Nara Prefectural Museum of Art			39.4 centimetres (15.5 in) by 107.3 centimetres (42.2 in)	34°41′09″N 135°49′58″E	
Buddha’s Parinirvana, colour on silk 絹本著色仏涅槃図 kenpon chakushoku Butsu nehan zu	Kamakura period	Nara	Kairyūō-ji (海龍王寺)				34°41′34″N 135°48′20″E	
Hokke Mandala, colour on silk 絹本著色法華曼荼羅図 kenpon chakushoku Hokke mandara zu	Kamakura period	Nara	Oribe Jinja (下部神社)			107 centimetres (42 in) by 74 centimetres (29 in)	34°34′24″N 135°57′51″E	
Arrival of the Nanban - Horse Race, colour on paper with gold ground 紙本金地著色南蛮人渡来図・競馬図 shihon kinji chakushoku Nanban-jin torai zu・kurabe-uma zu	Edo period	Nara	Tōshōdai-ji	pair of screens			34°40′32″N 135°47′05″E	
Six Paths, colour on paper 紙本著色六道絵 shihon chakushoku rokudō-e	Momoyama period	Tenri	Chōgaku-ji				34°33′40″N 135°51′07″E	
En no Gyōja, colour on silk 絹本著色役行者像 kenpon chakushoku En no Gyōja zō	Kamakura period	Tenri	Kaminyūta District (上入田区)				34°36′22″N 135°54′25″E	
Pictorial Biography of Shōtoku Taishi, colour on silk 絹本著色聖徳太子絵伝 kenpon chakushoku Shōtoku Taishi e-den	Muromachi period	Sakurai	Tanzan Jinja	four scrolls			34°27′57″N 135°51′42″E	
Legends of Tōnomine, colour on silk 絹本著色多武峰縁起 kenpon chakushoku Tōnomine engi	Muromachi period	Sakurai	Tanzan Jinja	four handscrolls; designation includes storage cases with wisteria in maki-e		48.2 centimetres (19.0 in) by 384.3 centimetres (12 ft 7.3 in) to 562.3 centimetres (18 ft 5.4 in)	34°27′57″N 135°51′42″E	
Kōgyō Daishi, colour on silk 絹本著色興教大師像 kenpon chakushoku Kōgyō Daishi zō	Kamakura period	Sakurai	Hase-dera				34°32′09″N 135°54′25″E	
Jūichimen Kannon, colour on silk 紙本著色本尊十一面観音御影 kenpon chakushoku honzon Jūichimen Kannon mikage	Muromachi period	Sakurai	Hase-dera				34°32′09″N 135°54′25″E	
Kasuga Mandala, colour on silk 絹本著色春日曼荼羅図 kenpon chakushoku Kasuga Mandala zu	Muromachi period	Sakurai	Hase-dera				34°32′09″N 135°54′25″E	
Legends of Hase-dera, colour on paper 紙本著色長谷寺縁起 shihon chakushoku Hasedera engi	Muromachi period	Sakurai	Hase-dera	six handscrolls			34°32′09″N 135°54′25″E	
Fudō Myōō-Aizen Myōō, monochrome ink on paper 紙本白描 不動明王図像/愛染明王図像 shihon hakubyō Fudō Myōō zu zō/Aizen Myōō zu zō	Kamakura period	Sakurai	Hase-dera	pair of handscrolls			34°32′09″N 135°54′25″E	
Pure Land of Amida, colour on silk (Chikō Mandala) 絹本著色阿弥陀浄土図(伝智光曼荼羅) kenpon chakushoku Amida jōdo zu (den-Chikō mandara)	Muromachi period	Sakurai	Nōman-in				34°32′12″N 135°54′27″E	
Fugen and the Ten Rasetsunyo, colour on silk 絹本著色普賢十羅刹女像 kenpon chakushoku Fugen jū rasetsunyo zō	Kamakura period	Sakurai	Nōman-in				34°32′12″N 135°54′27″E	
Tenkawa Benzaiten Mandala, colour on silk, by Shiba Rinken 絹本著色天川弁才天曼荼羅図 芝琳賢筆 kenpon chakushoku Tenkawa Benzaiten mandara zu Shiba Rinken hitsu	1546	Nara	Nōman-in (kept at Nara National Museum)			99.4 centimetres (39.1 in) by 39.4 centimetres (1 ft 3.5 in)	34°40′59″N 135°50′17″E	
Fujiwara no Muchimaro, colour on silk 絹本著色藤原武智麿像 kenpon chakushoku Fujiwara no Muchimaro zō	Muromachi period	Gojō	Eizan-ji (榮山寺)				34°21′21″N 135°43′14″E	
Descent of Amida Triad with the Six Aspects of Jizō, colour on silk 絹本著色阿弥陀三尊六地蔵来迎図 kenpon chakushoku Amida sanzon roku Jizō raigō zu	Kamakura period	Gojō	Kissho-ji (吉祥寺)				34°19′33″N 135°41′52″E	
Ikoma Mandala, colour on silk 絹本著色生駒曼荼羅 kenpon chakushoku Ikoma mandara	1456	Ikoma	Ikoma Jinja				34°40′41″N 135°42′13″E	
Jukkanshō, ink on paper 紙本墨画十巻抄 shihon bokuga jukkanshō	1226	Ikoma	Hōzan-ji	ten handscrolls; a copy of the late-Heian Esoteric Buddhist iconography			34°41′05″N 135°41′12″E	
Taima Mandala, colour on silk 絹本著色當麻曼荼羅図 kenpon chakushoku Taima mandara zu	1674	Katsuragi	Oku-no-in				34°31′00″N 135°41′37″E	
Chūjō-hime, colour on silk 絹本著色中将姫像 kenpon chakushoku Chūjō-hime zō	Kamakura period	Katsuragi	Nakanobō			142.5 centimetres (56.1 in) by 66.3 centimetres (26.1 in)	34°30′56″N 135°41′44″E	
Pictorial Biography of Shōtoku Taishi, colour on silk 絹本著色聖徳太子絵伝 kenpon chakushoku Shōtoku Taishi e-den	Muromachi period	Nara	National Institutes for Cultural Heritage (kept at Nara National Museum)	pair of scrolls; formerly in the possession of Ōkura-ji (大蔵寺) and kept at the Nara National Museum; acquired by NICH for the Museum in 2017 for ¥40,000,000		157.8 centimetres (5 ft 2.1 in) to 86.5 centimetres (2 ft 10.1 in) and 157.2 centimetres (5 ft 1.9 in) to 86.7 centimetres (2 ft 10.1 in)	34°40′59″N 135°50′17″E	
Descent of Amida and the Heavenly Retinue, colour on silk 絹本著色阿弥陀聖衆来迎図 kenpon chakushoku Amida shōju raigō zu	Kamakura period	Nara	National Institutes for Cultural Heritage (kept at Nara National Museum)	formerly in the possession of Ōkura-ji (大蔵寺) and kept at the Nara National Museum; acquired by NICH for the Museum in 2017 for ¥50,000,000		123.1 centimetres (4 ft 0.5 in) to 84.0 centimetres (2 ft 9.1 in)	34°40′59″N 135°50′17″E	
Eight Patriarchs of Shingon, colour on silk 絹本著色真言八祖像 kenpon chakushoku Shingon hasso zō	Kamakura period	Uda	Murō-ji	eight scrolls			34°32′16″N 136°02′26″E	
Zennyo Ryūō, colour on silk 絹本著色善女龍王図 kenpon chakushoku Zennyo Ryūō zu	Muromachi period	Tawaramoto	Rakuden-ji (楽田寺)				34°33′10″N 135°47′39″E	
Mandala of the Two Realms, gold and silver paint on indigo ground 紺地金銀泥両界曼荼羅図 konji kingin dei ryōkai mandara zu	Kamakura period	Takatori	Minami Hokke-ji (南法華寺)	pair of scrolls			34°26′40″N 135°47′50″E	
Buddha’s Parinirvana, colour on silk 絹本着色仏涅槃図 kenpon chakushoku butsu nehan zu	1380	Asuka	Tachibana-dera			280.5 centimetres (110.4 in) by 206.4 centimetres (81.3 in)	34°28′12″N 135°49′03″E	
Mandala of the Two Realms, colour on wooden boards 板絵著色両界曼荼羅図 ita-e chakushoku ryōkai mandara zu	1424	Kōryō	Daifuku-ji (大福寺)	pair of paintings			34°33′59″N 135°45′08″E	
Yoshino Mandala, colour on paper 紙本著色吉野曼荼羅 shihon chakushoku Yoshino mandara	Muromachi period	Yoshino	Nyoirin-ji (如意輪寺)				34°21′52″N 135°52′04″E	

== Municipal Cultural Properties ==
Properties designated at a municipal level include:

Property	Date	Municipality	Ownership	Comments	Image	Dimensions	Coordinates	Ref.
Kasuga Deities Departing from Kashima Shrine, colour on silk 絹本著色鹿島立神影図 kenpon chakushoku Kashima dachi shin-ei zu	Nanboku-chō/Muromachi period	Nara	Kasuga Taisha			107.6 centimetres (42.4 in) by 39.0 centimetres (15.4 in)	34°40′53″N 135°50′54″E	
Taima Mandala, colour on silk 絹本著色当麻曼荼羅図 kenpon chakushoku Taima mandara zu	Kamakura period	Nara	Raikō-ji (来迎寺)			166.3 centimetres (65.5 in) by 152.9 centimetres (60.2 in)	34°35′36″N 135°56′48″E	
Tosō Tenjin, colour on silk 絹本著色渡宋天神像 kenpon chakushoku Tosō Tenjin zō	early/mid-C15	Nara	Sugawara Tenmangū (菅原天満宮) (kept at Nara National Museum)	holding a branch of plum blossoms; with gasan or accompanying text by Gukyoku Reisai (愚極礼才) (1370-1452)		88.6 centimetres (34.9 in) by 33.0 centimetres (13.0 in)	34°40′59″N 135°50′17″E	
Eison (Kōshō Bosatsu), colour on silk 絹本著色興正菩薩像 kenpon chakushoku Kōshō Bosatsu zō	Kamakura period	Nara	Saidai-ji (kept at Nara National Museum)				34°40′59″N 135°50′17″E	
Eison (Kōshō Bosatsu), colour on silk 絹本著色興正菩薩像 kenpon chakushoku Kōshō Bosatsu zō	Kamakura period	Nara	Tōshōdai-ji				34°40′32″N 135°47′05″E	
Shinkū, colour on silk 絹本著色慈真和尚像 kenpon chakushoku Jishin oshō zō	Kamakura period	Nara	Hokke-ji				34°41′33″N 135°48′15″E	
Legends of Yata Jizō, colour on paper 紙本著色矢田地蔵縁起 shihon chakushoku Yata Jizō engi	Muromachi period	Nara	private	one scroll			34°42′17″N 135°44′03″E	
Kasuga Gongen Genkidai 春日権現験記台; Kasuga Gongen genkidai	Kamakura period	Nara	Kasuga Taisha	six panels			34°40′53″N 135°50′48″E	
Tsutsui Junkei, colour on silk 絹本著色筒井順慶像 kenpon chakushoku Tsutsui Junkei zō	Momoyama period	Nara	Denkō-ji (伝香寺)			110.4 centimetres (43.5 in) by 41.1 centimetres (16.2 in)	34°40′50″N 135°49′33″E	
Town and Country, emaki 絹本著色都鄙図巻 kenpon chakushoku tohizu maki	Edo period	Nara	Konbu-in (興福院) (kept at Nara National Museum)	1 scroll			34°40′59″N 135°50′17″E	
Congratulating Empress Meishō on her 70th Birthday, colour on paper with gold ground, byōbu 紙本金地著色明正院七十賀月次絵屏風 shihon kinji chakushoku Meishō-in nanajū ga getsuji e byōbu	Edo period	Nara	Enshō-ji	pair of six-panel screens			34°38′37″N 135°50′44″E	
Grazing in Springtime and Autumn Fields, colour on paper, byōbu 紙本著色春郊放牧・田園秋色図屏風 shihon chakushoku shunkō hōboku denen shūshoku zu byōbu	Edo period	Nara	Enshō-ji	pair of six-panel screens			34°38′37″N 135°50′44″E	
Tamaya Partition Paintings 霊屋障壁画; Tamaya shōhekiga	mid-Edo period	Kyoto	Konbu-in (興福院) (kept at Kyoto National Museum)	20 panels by Watanabe Shikō (渡辺始興)			34°59′24″N 135°46′23″E	
Former Fukuju-in Partition Paintings, by Nagasawa Rosetsu 旧福寿院障壁画 長沢芦雪筆 kyū Fukuju-in shōhekiga Nagasawa Rosetsu hitsu	late-C18	Nara	Yakushi-ji (kept at Nara National Museum)	29 panels			34°40′59″N 135°50′17″E	
Ema with Storage Box 絵馬板附収納箱 ema-ban tsuketari shūnōbako	Muromachi period	Nara	Kasuga Taisha	5 ema			34°40′50″N 135°50′37″E	
Toyotomi Hidenaga 豊臣秀長画像; Toyotomi Hidenaga gazō	Edo period	Yamatokōriyama	Shungakuin (春岳院)			118 centimetres (46 in) by 55 centimetres (22 in)	34°39′03″N 135°47′03″E	
Yanagisawa Yoshiyasu 柳澤吉保画像; Yanagisawa Yoshiyasu gazō	Edo period	Yamatokōriyama	private					
Rikugi-en, emaki 六義園絵巻; Rikugi-en, emaki	Edo period	Yamatokōriyama	Yanagisawa Bunko (柳沢文庫)	3 scrolls			34°39′04″N 135°46′49″E	
View of Kōriyama Castle 郡山城の図(享保9年); Kōriyama-jō no zu (Kyōhō 9-nen)	1724	Yamatokōriyama	Yanagisawa Bunko (柳沢文庫)				34°39′04″N 135°46′49″E	
View of Kōriyama Castle 郡山城の図(安政年間); Kōriyama-jō no zu (Ansei nenkan)	1854-60	Yamatokōriyama	Yanagisawa Bunko (柳沢文庫)				34°39′04″N 135°46′49″E	
Maps of the Town Divisions 町割図 machi wari zu	Edo period	Yamatokōriyama	Yanagisawa Bunko (柳沢文庫)	29 items			34°39′04″N 135°46′49″E	
Map of Residences with Roads and Names 御家中屋敷小路割名前図; Gokachū Nakayashiki kōji wari namae-zu	Edo period	Yamatokōriyama	Yanagisawa Bunko (柳沢文庫)				34°39′04″N 135°46′49″E	
Old View of Kōriyama Castle 郡山城古図; Kōriyama-jō kozu	Edo period	Yamatokōriyama	Hatsushi-in (発志院)				34°38′50″N 135°45′39″E	
Kasuga Akadōji, colour on silk 絹本著色春日赤童子画像 kenpon chakushoku Kasuga Akadōji gazō	1488	Yamatokōriyama	Uetsuki Jinja (植槻神社)			73.9 centimetres (29.1 in) by 31.5 centimetres (12.4 in)	34°39′14″N 135°46′54″E	
Occurrences of Kasuga Festival 春日御祭之次第(上下巻); Kasuga omatsuri no shidai (jōgekan)	Edo period	Yamatokōriyama	Yanagisawa Bunko (柳沢文庫)	two scrolls			34°39′04″N 135°46′49″E	
Illustrated Legends of Uetsuki Dōjō, emaki 植槻道場縁起絵巻; Uetsuki dōjō engi emaki	Edo period	Yamatokōriyama	Uetsuki Jinja (植槻神社)	1 scroll			34°39′14″N 135°46′54″E	
Chinese Lions, fusuma 唐獅子図戸襖絵 karajishi zu to fusuma-e	1761	Yamatokōriyama	Yakuon Hachiman Jinja (薬園八幡神社)	8 panels		180 centimetres (71 in) by 97 centimetres (38 in)	34°38′48″N 135°47′13″E	

== See also ==
- Cultural Properties of Japan
- List of National Treasures of Japan (paintings)
- Japanese painting
- List of Historic Sites of Japan (Nara)
- List of Cultural Properties of Japan - historical materials (Nara)
