= Tachibana-dera =

Buddhist temple in Asuka, Nara, Japan

- 橘寺
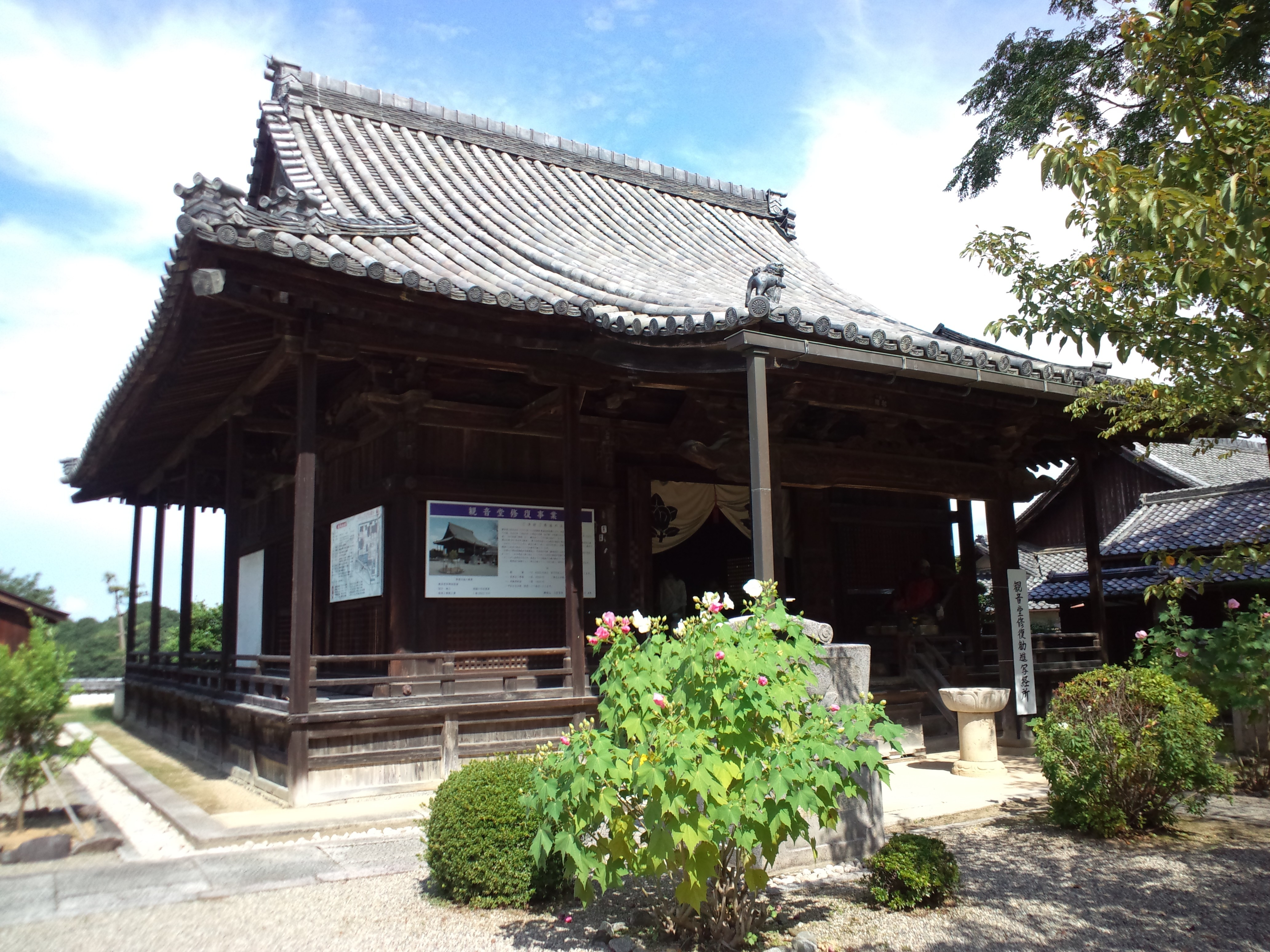
- Kannon-do of Tachibana-dera

- Location within Nara Prefecture Location within Japan

Religion
- Affiliation: Buddhist
- Deity: Prince Shōtoku
- Rite: Tendai
- Status: active

Location
- Location: 32 Tachibana, Asuka, Takaichi District, Nara 634-0142
- Country: Japan
- Interactive map of Tachibana-dera
- Coordinates: 34°28′12″N 135°49′5″E

Architecture
- Completed: c.606
- National Historic Site }

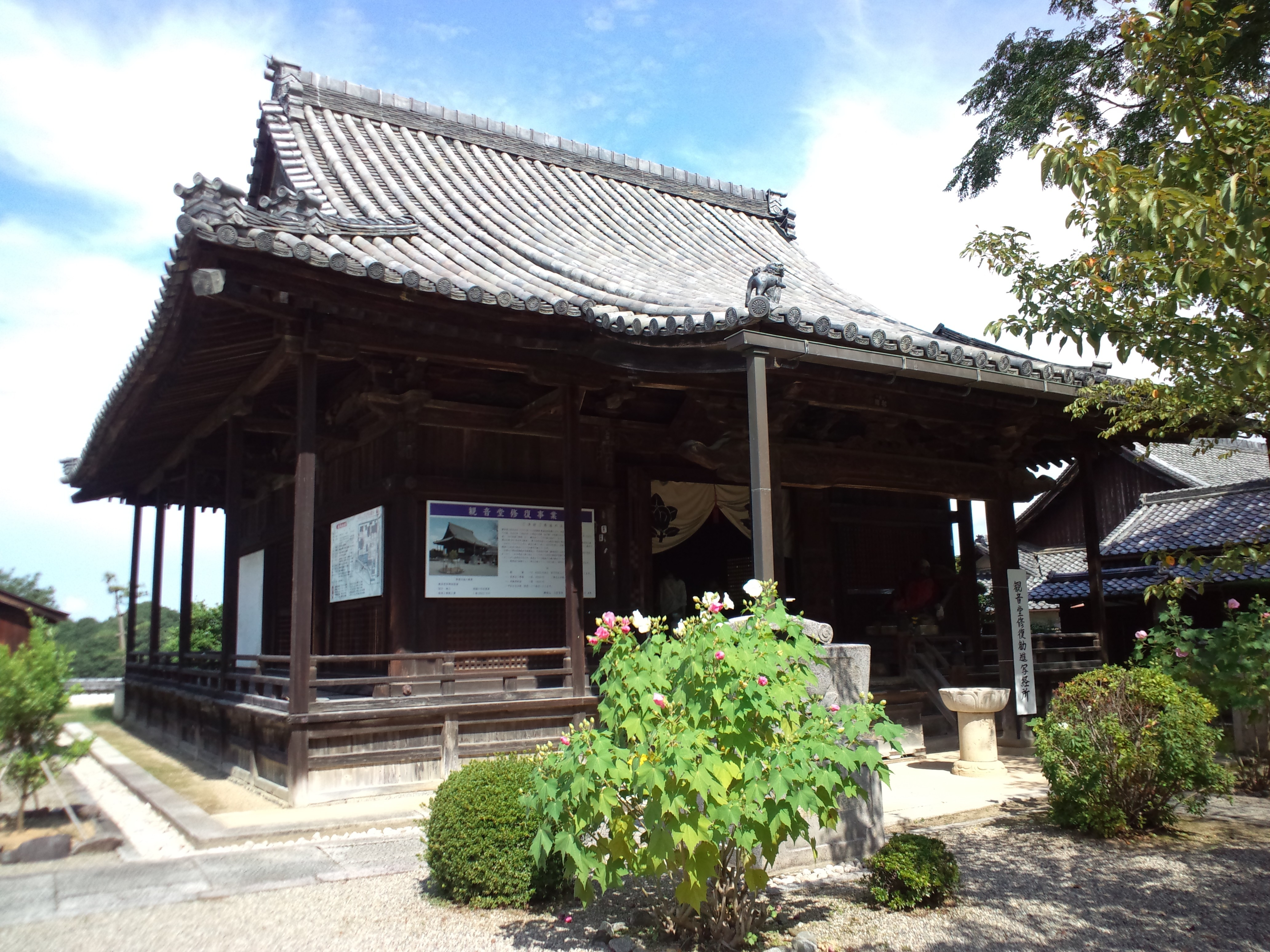
Kannon-do

Tachibana-dera (橘寺) is a Buddhist temple located in the village of Asuka, Nara Prefecture, Japan. It belongs to the Tendai sect and its honzon is a statue of Prince Shōtoku. The temple's full name is Butsuzan Jogū Koin Bodaiji (仏頭山上宮皇院菩提寺).The name "Tachibana-dera" comes from a legend that a sapling of the tachibana fruit of immortality that Tajimamori brought back the from the magical land of Tokoyo no kuni during the reign of Emperor Suinin was planted at this location.The precincts of the temple have been protected as a designated a National Historic Site since 1966.

== History ==
Tachibana-dera is located near the place where Prince Shōtoku is said to have been born, and is one of the seven great temples built by Prince Shōtoku during his lifetime. According to legend, Prince Shōtoku converted a branch palace of his father, Emperor Yōmei, into a temple. Historically, the founding date of the temple is uncertain, but the first documented reference to it is in the "Nihon Shoki", in the entry for April of the 9th year of Emperor Tenmu's reign (680), which states, "A fire broke out in the nunnery of Tachibana-dera, burning ten rooms."

Archaeologically, among the ancient roof tiles unearthed at the temple, a round tile with a multi-petaled lotus motif, which is thought to be from the temple's foundation is dated to the first quarter of the 7th century,. However, few tiles from this period have been unearthed, and it is believed that full-scale construction began after the mid-7th century. To the north of Tachibana-dera is Kawara-dera, a nationally-sponsored temple. As the roof tiles excavated from Tachibana-dera are identical to those used at Kawara-dera, and because the central axis of the Kawara-dera temple complex coincides with that of the north gate of Tachibana-dera, it is possible that Tachibana-dera was built as a convent, which agrees with the Nihon Shoki entry. Excavations have further revealed that the original buildings were arranged in a Shitennō-ji or Yamada-dera layout, with the main gate, pagoda, main hall, and lecture hall lined up in a straight line from east to west. Excavations have uncovered a row of stones just before the remains of the lecture hall, which suggests that the lecture hall was located outside the corridor in which case the layout would be in the Yamada-dera style. However, because the length of the discovered stone row was short and the stone row was close to the remains of the lecture hall, it is unclear whether there was a corridor in front of the lecture hall.

In the 8th century, Tachibana-dera flourished with 66 buildings under the patronage of the imperial family and aristocracy, but in 1148 during the late Heian period, the five-story pagoda was burned down by lightning. In the Bunji era (1185-1189), it was rebuilt as a three-story pagoda. In 1506, during the late Muromachi period, when Akazawa Chokei, a vassal of the Muromachi shogunate's regent Hosokawa Masamoto, attacked Myoraku-ji, the armed monks of that temple retaliated by burning down Tachibana-dera. The temple never regained its former prosperity, dwindling down to a small chapel, and surviving largely due to its association with Prince Shōtoku. The current main hall was built in 1864.

== Cultural Properties ==
=== National Important Cultural Properties ===
- Wooden statue of seated Prince Shotoku (木造聖徳太子坐像), Muromachi period, dated 1515.
- Wooden statue of standing priest Nichira (木造日羅立像), Heian period.
- Wooden statue of seated Nyoirin Kannon (木造如意輪観音坐像), Heian period.
- Wooden statue of standing Jizo Bosatsu (木造地蔵菩薩立像), Heian period.
- Wooden frame for taiko drum (鼉太鼓縁), Kamakura period,
- Silk paintings of life of Prince Shōtoku, 8 scrolls (絹本著色太子絵伝 8幅), Nanboku-cho period, attributed to Tosa Mitsunobu
- Stone lantern (石燈籠), Kamakura period.

== See also ==
- Historical Sites of Prince Shōtoku
- List of Historic Sites of Japan (Nara)
