= Nara Prefectural Museum of Art =

- 奈良県立美術館
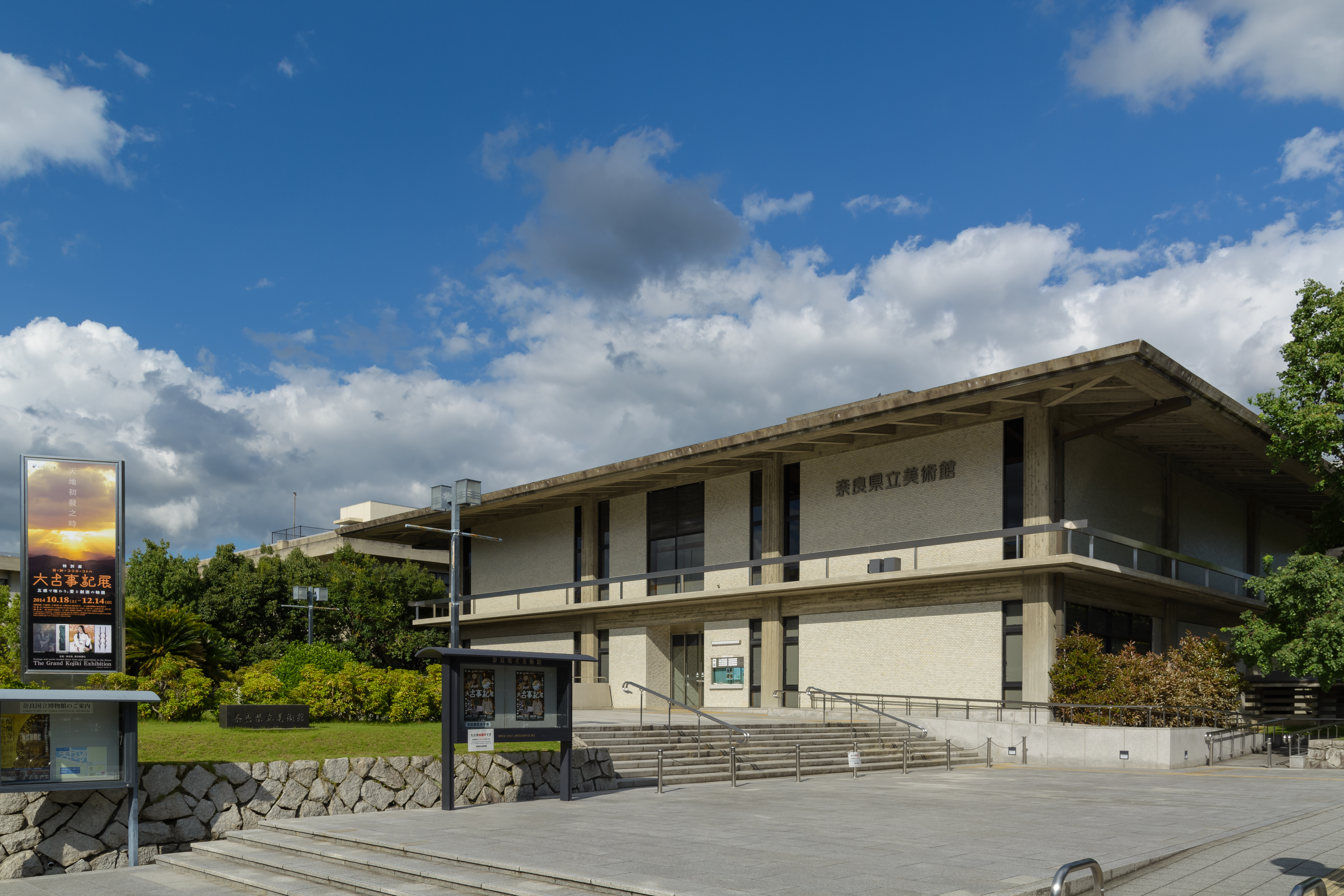
- Interactive map of the Nara Prefectural Museum of Art area

General information
- Location: 10-6 Noboriōji-chō, Nara, Nara Prefecture, Japan
- Coordinates: 34°41′09″N 135°49′58″E
- Opened: March 1973

Website
- Official website

Nara Prefectural Museum of Art (奈良県立美術館, Nara kenritsu bijutsukan) opened in Nara, Japan in 1973. The collection numbers some 4,100 items and special exhibitions are also held.

== See also ==
- Yamato Bunkakan
- Nara National Museum
- List of Cultural Properties of Japan - paintings (Nara)
