= Sefuku-ji =

Buddhist temple in Izumi, Osaka, Japan

- 施福寺
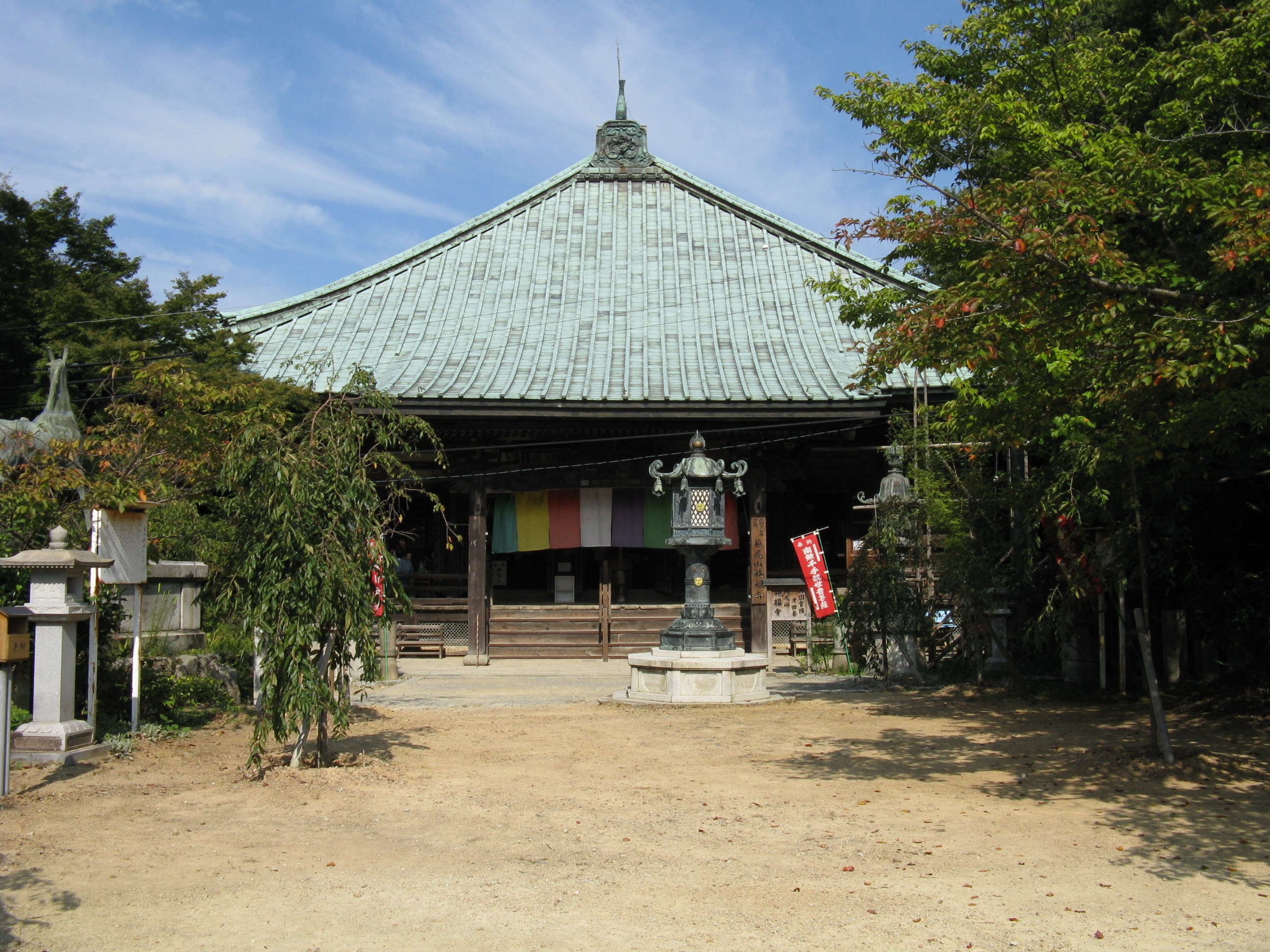
- Sefuku-ji Hondō

- Location within Osaka Prefecture Location within Japan

Religion
- Affiliation: Buddhist
- Deity: Miroku Bosatsu.
- Rite: Tendai
- Status: functional

Location
- Location: 136 Makioysanchō, Izumi-shi, Osaka-fu 594-1131
- Interactive map of Sefuku-ji
- Coordinates: 34°23′34.47″N 135°30′41.68″E

Architecture
- Founder: c. Gyōman, Emperor Kinmei
- Completed: c.Kofun period
- National Important Cultural Property

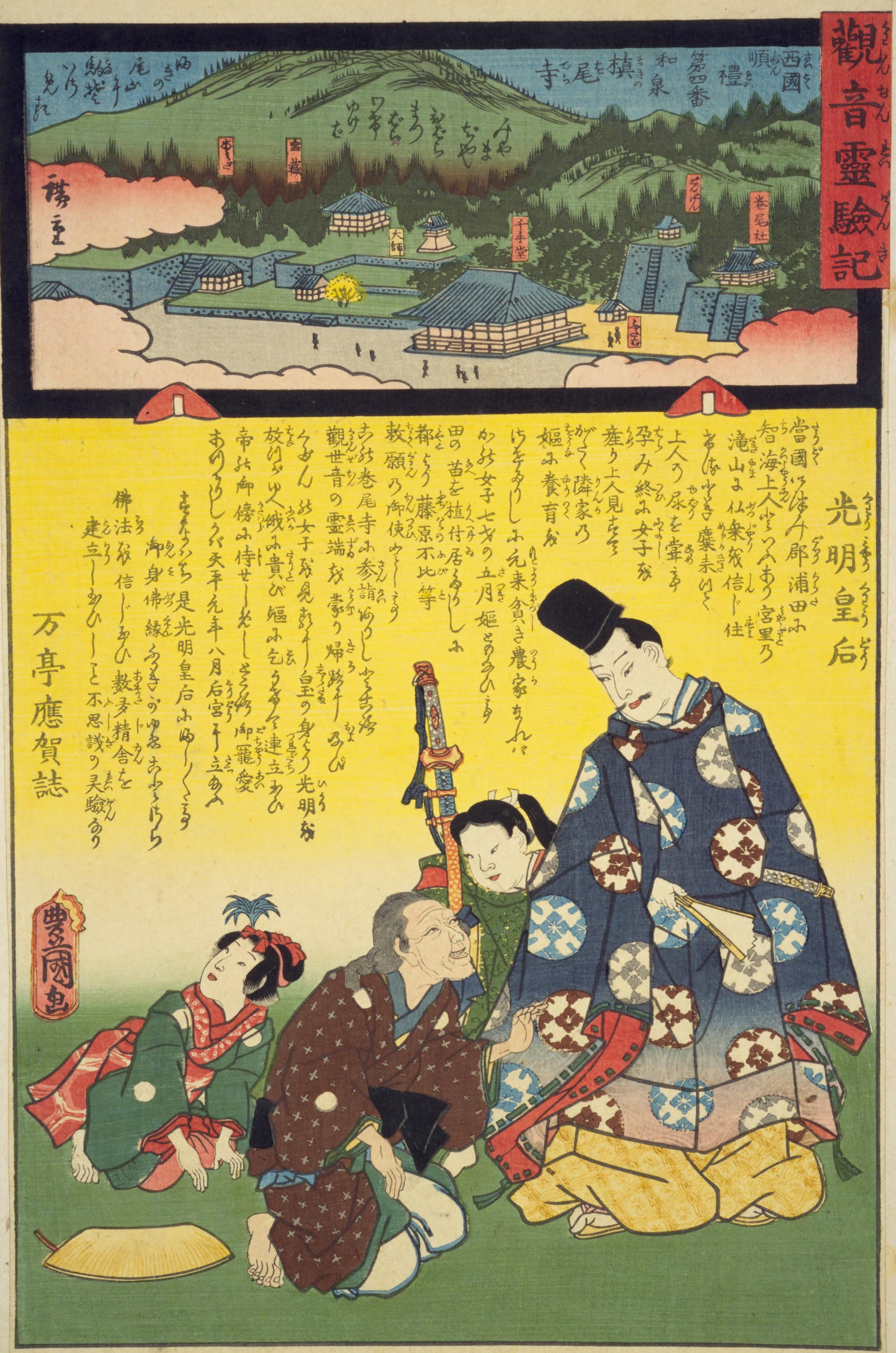
from the picture album "Kannon Reigen ki"

Sefuku-ji (施福寺) is a Buddhist temple located in the Makiosan, neighborhood of the city of Izumi, Osaka Prefecture Japan. It belongs to the Tendai sect of Japanese Buddhism and its honzon is a statue of Miroku Bosatsu.The temple's full name is Makio-san Sefuku-ji (槇尾山 施福寺). The temple is the 4th stop on the Saigoku Kannon Pilgrimage route. The main image of Miroku Bosatsu is flanked by a Jūichimen Kannon Bosatsu to the right and a Monjū Bosatsu to the left. It is also commonly known as "Makio-dera."

== Overview ==
The origin of this temple is uncertain. Formerly known as Makiosan-ji (槇尾山寺), is believed to have been founded as a temple connected with the Mount Katsuragi Shugendō mountain worship practices. According to the Makio-san Daiengi (1360), a temple history compiled during the Nanboku-chō period, Sefuku-ji was founded by the monk Gyōman of Kako County, Harima Province, during the reign of Emperor Kinmei (539-571). According to legend, in 771, a shabbily dressed monk appeared before Hōkai, a monk from Settsu Province who was residing at Makiosan-ji at the time, and asked to stay at the temple during his summer retreat. He was accepted as a guest monk, and devoted himself to his training. When leaving the temple after his scheduled stay, he asked for money for his return journey, but the temple monks refused. The guest monk then became enraged and yelled, "What a shame! This temple may look impressive, but there are no true monks here. A temple like this will eventually perish and become a den of evil spirits." Astonished, Hōkai followed him and found the monk walking unsinkingly across the ocean in the distance. Upon seeing this, Hōkai realized that the monk was an incarnation of Kannon who had appeared to admonish them, so he carved a statue of the Jūichimen Kannon and enshrined it. The legend further embellishes the story with stories related to En no Gyōja, Gyōki, and Kūkai The legend states that En no Gyōja buried the volumes of the Lotus Sutra he had personally copied in secret locations throughout Mount Katsuragi, and that the last one to be buried was on this mountain. It also states that Kūkai, at the age of 20, was tonsured at this temple in 793. While there are no historical documents suggesting he was tonsured at this location, it is likely that he may have stayed at the temple around 809 en route to Heian-kyō during his return trip from Tang China. According to the Engi, the Sefuku-ji was designated a Jogaku-ji temple (a private temple within the Ritsuryō system that received treatment from the Imperial Court equivalent to official temples) in 916, but as the historical records of Sefuku-ji have been lost over the centuries due to repeated fires, even this cannot be verified, but it is clear that this was a prominent temple by the first half of the 9th century. The subsequent history of the temple also has many gaps. It is known that Emperor Go-Shirakawa donated a Lotus Sutra and a Buddhist statue during the Shōka era (1257-1259). During the Ninji era (1240-1243), a Kanjō-dō (a hall for the esoteric Buddhist master-succession ceremony) was built by Gyōhen, a monk from Ninna-ji(s Bodai-in, and later the temple came under the control of Ninna-ji itself. At its peak, it is said to have had as many as 1,000 sub-temples.

During the Nanboku-chō period (1400-1533), Sefuku-ji became one of the bases for the Southern Court. As a result, the temple was frequently caught up in wars and fell into decline. In 1581, the entire temple was burned down by Oda Nobunaga. However, with the assistance of Toyotomi Hideyori, the temple's buildings, including the Niōmon Gate, were rebuilt in 1603. During the Edo period, the temple gained the support of the Tokugawa shogunate, and converted from Shingon to the Tendai sect around the Kan'ei era (1624-1645) and became a branch temple of Kan'ei-ji in Edo. In 1845, a forest fire destroyed all but the Niōmon Gate. The Main Hall was rebuilt during the Ansei era (1854-1860).

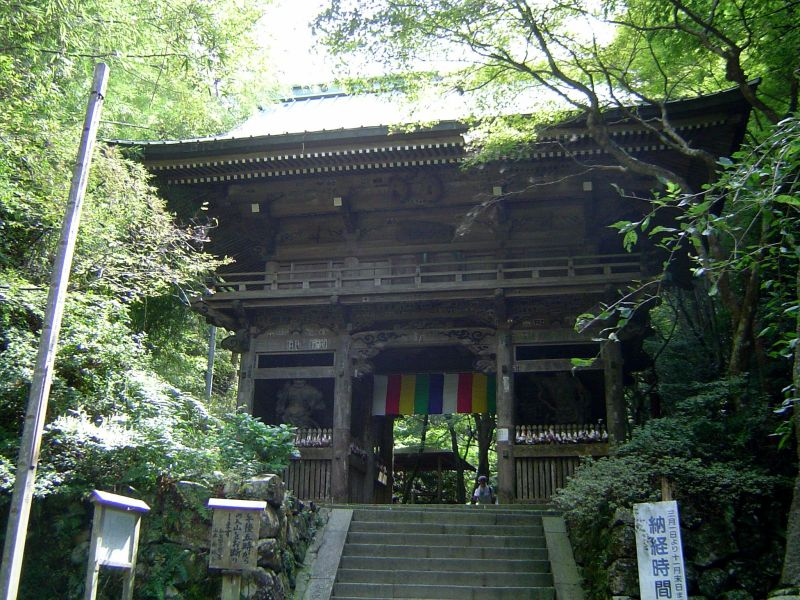
Sanmon

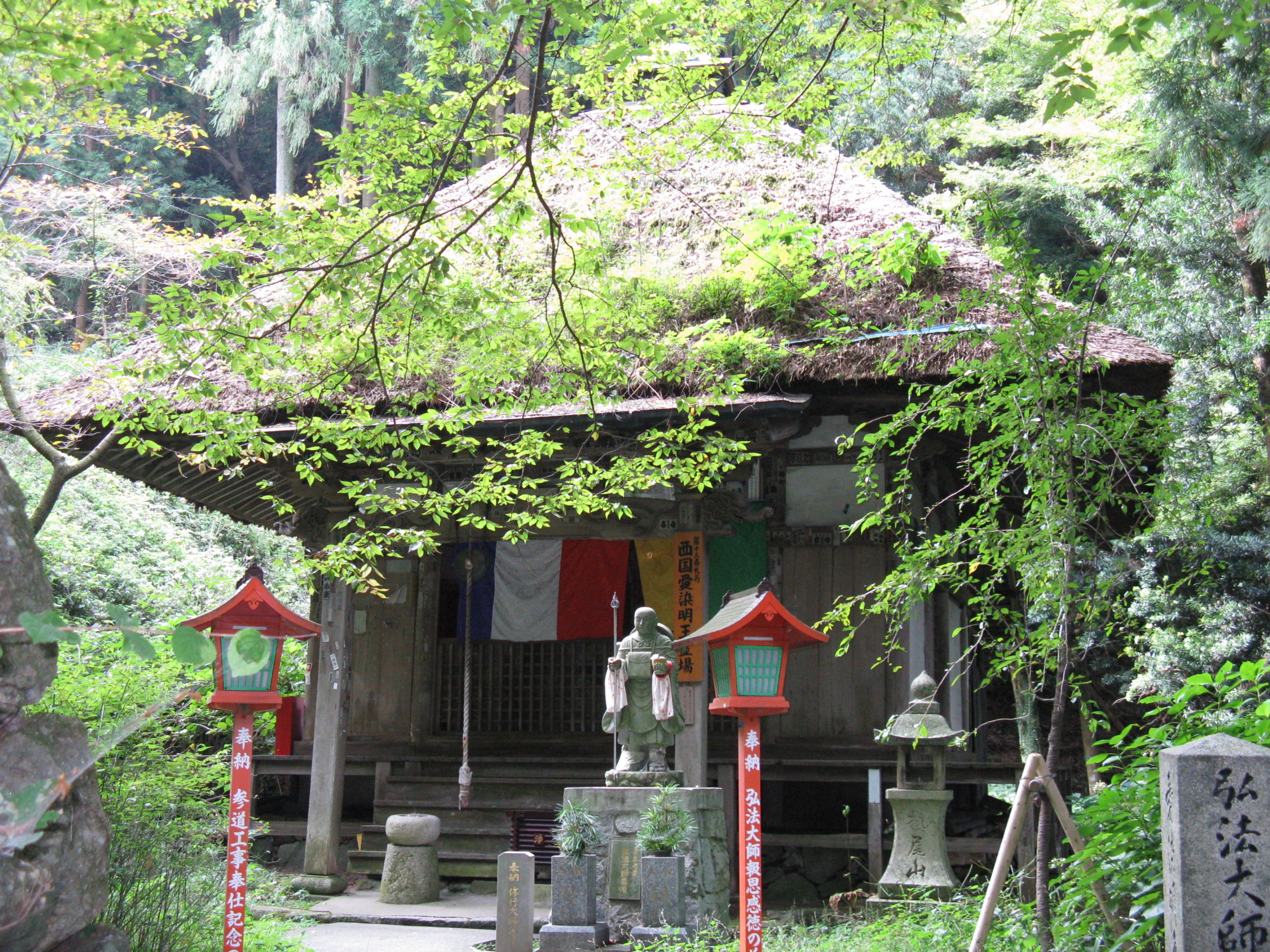
Aizen-dō

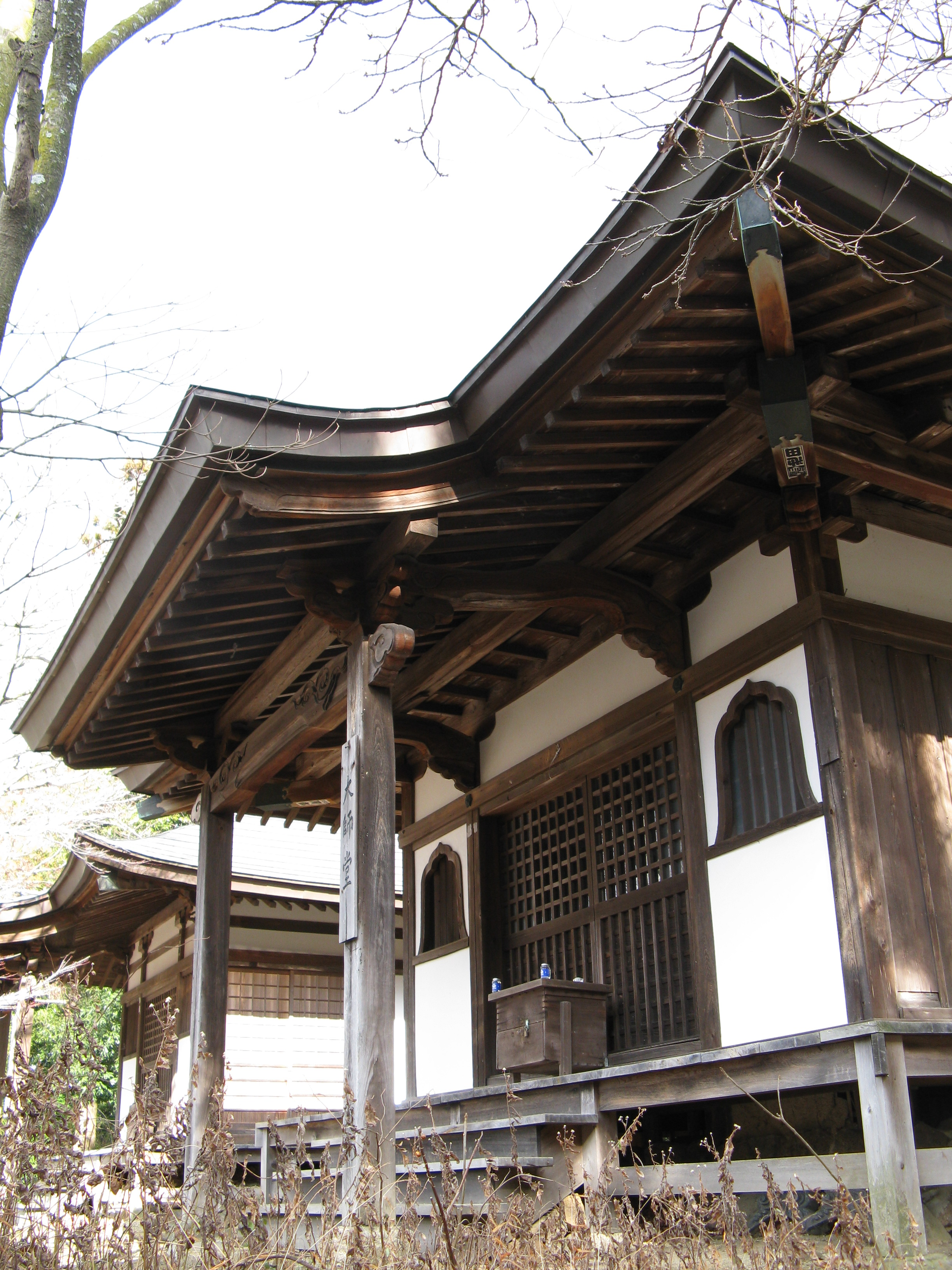
Daishi-dō

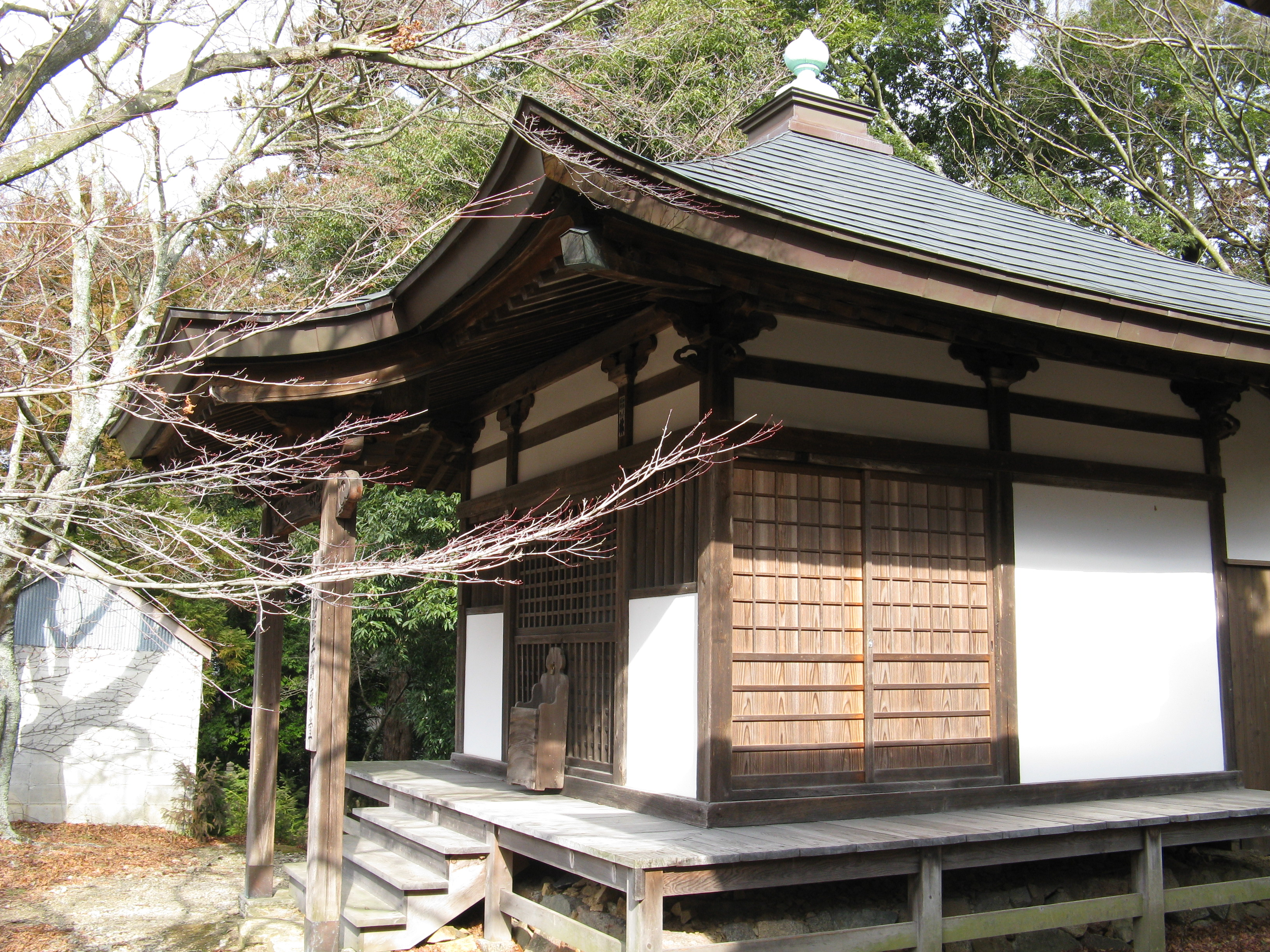
Goma-dō

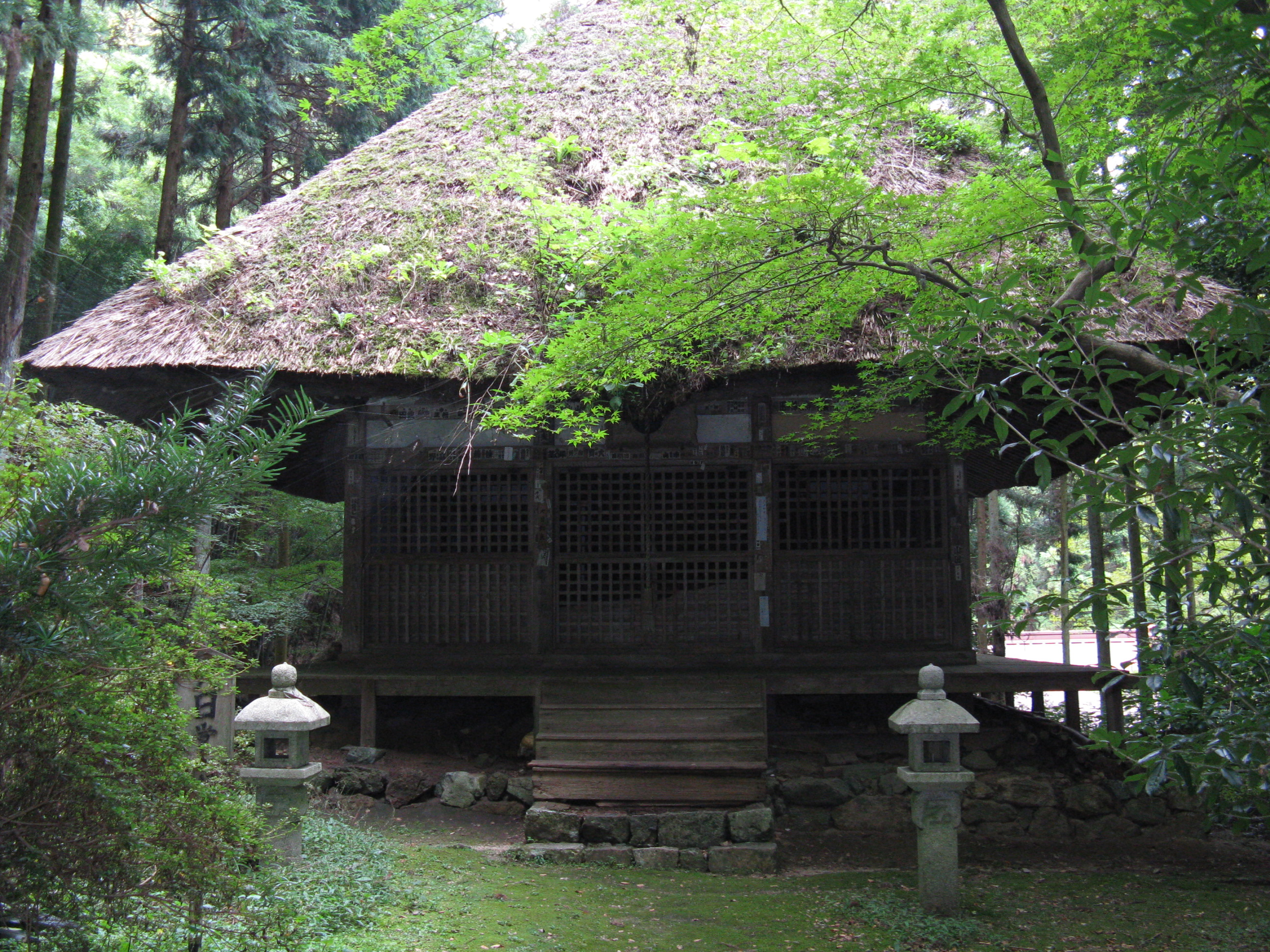
Dainichi-dō

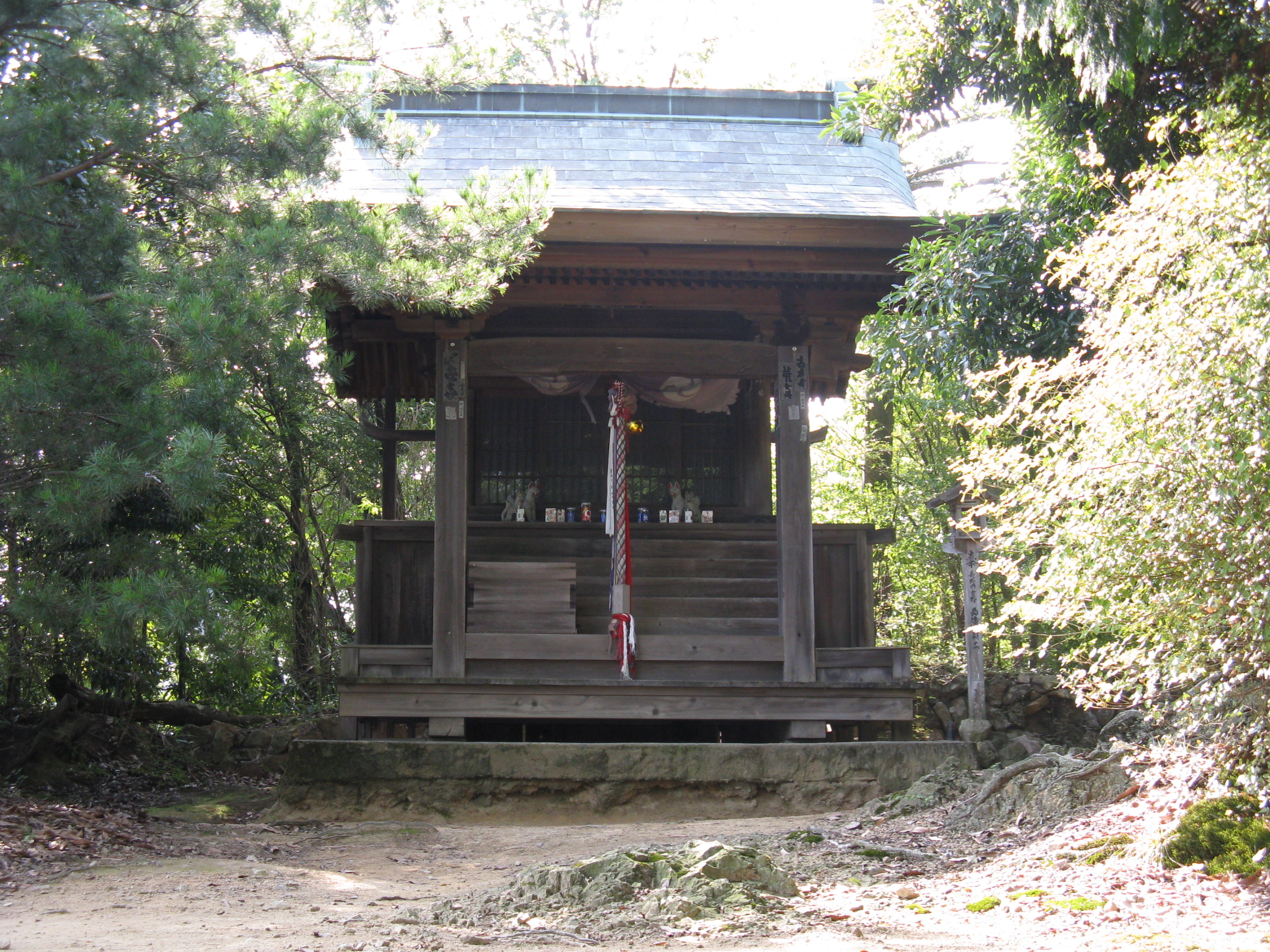
Makio Myōjin

The temple is approximately a 30-minute walk from Makioyama bus stop, only accessible by an on-demand bus service.

== Cultural Properties ==
=== National Important Cultural Properties ===
- Makioyama-ji Dai-Engi (槇尾山大縁起（正平十五年筆写)), Nanboku-cho period; now at Osaka City Art Museum

=== Osaka Prefecture Designated Tangible Cultural Properties ===
- Wooden Statues of Fudō-Myōō and Two Doji (不動明王及び二童子), Heian-Kamakura period; now at Izumi-no-kuni History Museum
- Sefuku-ji Pilgrimage Mandala (施福寺参詣曼荼羅図（甲本）1幅), Muromachi period; now at Kyoto National Museum

=== Izumi City Designated Tangible Cultural Properties ===
- Wooden Standing Statue of Jizō Bosatsu (地蔵菩薩立像), Heian period; now at Izumi-no-kuni History Museum
- Wooden Standing Statue of Senjū Kannon (千手観音立像), Kamakura period; now at Izumi-no-kuni History Museum
- Wooden Standing Statue of Jizō Bosatsu (地蔵菩薩立像), Kamakura period; now at Izumi-no-kuni History Museum
- Wooden Standing Statue of Ryōgen (慈恵大師坐像), Kamakura period; now at Izumi-no-kuni History Museum
- Wooden Seated Statue of Dainichi Nyorai (大日如来坐像), Heian period; now at Izumi-no-kuni History Museum
- Peony arabesque three-legged incense burner (牡丹唐草文三足香炉), Yuan China; now at Izumi-no-kuni History Museum
- Paulownia snow-holding bamboo patterned kosode (Karaori woven short sleeve) (桐雪持ち笹文様唐織小袖), Azuchi-Momoyama period; now at Izumi-no-kuni History Museum
