= Ikoma Shrine =

Shinto shrine in Nara Prefecture, Japan

Ikoma Shrine 往馬坐伊古麻都比古神社
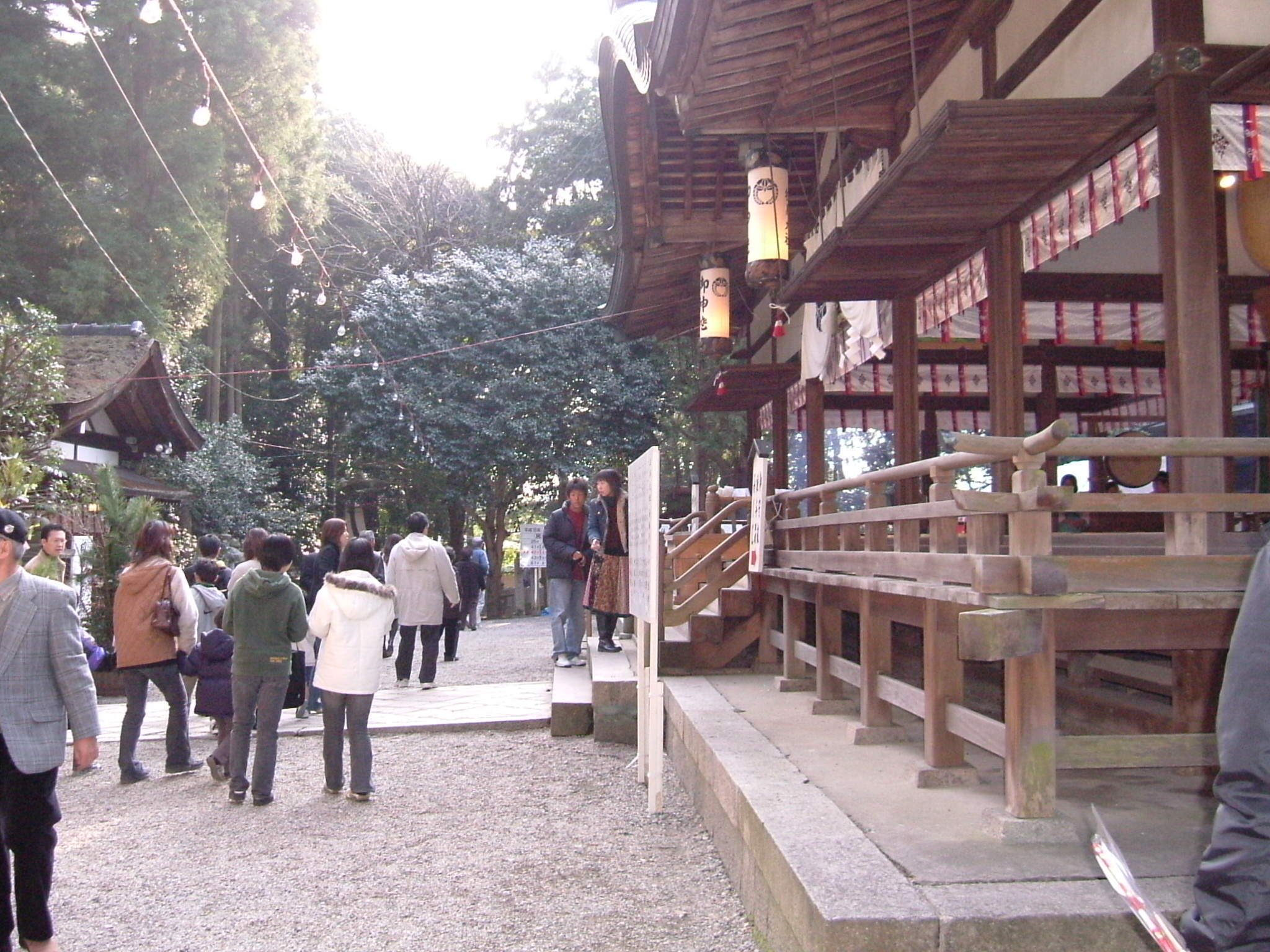
- Ikoma Shrine at Nara in Japan.

- Location within Japan

Religion
- Affiliation: Shinto
- Deity: Ikomatsu-Hikono-Kami; Ikomatsu-Himeno-Kami; Okinaga-Tarashihimeno-Mikoto; Tarashinakatsu-Hikono-Mikoto; Hondawakeno-Mikoto; Katsuragi-Takanukahimeno-Mikoto; Okinaga-Sukuneono-Mikoto
- Festival: 10 October

Location
- Location: 1527-1 Ichibu-chō; Ikoma; Nara prefecture
- Coordinates: 34°40′41″N 135°42′13″E

Architecture
- Style: Kasuga-zukuri

Website
- www.ikomataisha.com

Ikoma Jinja (生駒神社) is a Shinto shrine in Ikoma, Nara, Japan. Generally called Ikoma Taisha (往馬大社). The formal name of the shrine is "Ikomaniimasu-Ikomatsuhiko Jinja (往馬坐伊古麻都比古神社)". The shrine is also known as "Ikoma-Taisha", which means "great shrine of Ikoma".

== History ==
According to the Sokoku-Fudoki, an ancient record of Japan, this shrine was extant in 458. The original object of worship at the shrine was a mountain, Mount Ikoma, behind the shrine. The shrine has a long relationship with the Japanese royal family and the dynasty. In Engishiki, a formal record on shrines written in 972, this shrine was given the title of "Kanpei-dai", a very high rank among Japanese shrines.

== Patron deities ==
Today, the shrine is dedicated to seven gods, Ikomatsu-Hikono-Kami, Ikomatsu-Himeno-Kami, Okinaga-Tarashihimeno-Mikoto (Empress Jingū), Tarashinakatsu-Hikono-Mikoto (Emperor Chūai), Hondawakeno-Mikoto (Emperor Ōjin), and Katsuragi-Takanukahimeno-Mikoto (mother of Empress Jingū), Okinaga-Sukuneono-Mikoto (father of Empress Jingū). Ikomatsu-Hikono-Kami and Ikomatsu-Himeno-Mikoto are understood to be husband and wife, and are embodied by Mount Ikoma itself.

== Cultural Property ==
The shrine has the Ikoma-Mandara, or "Mandala of Ikoma", and the Mandala was selected as an Important Cultural Property by the Japanese government.

The shrine is also well known as a shrine of fire, and the Japanese royal family use the Shinboku or sacred woods of the shrine, as firewood at the Daijosai ceremony. In October, the shrine has the Hi-matsuri or the "festival of fire".

== Access ==
The entrance station to the shrine is Ichibu Station of Kintetsu Ikoma Line. About 5 minute walk from the station.

== Gallery ==
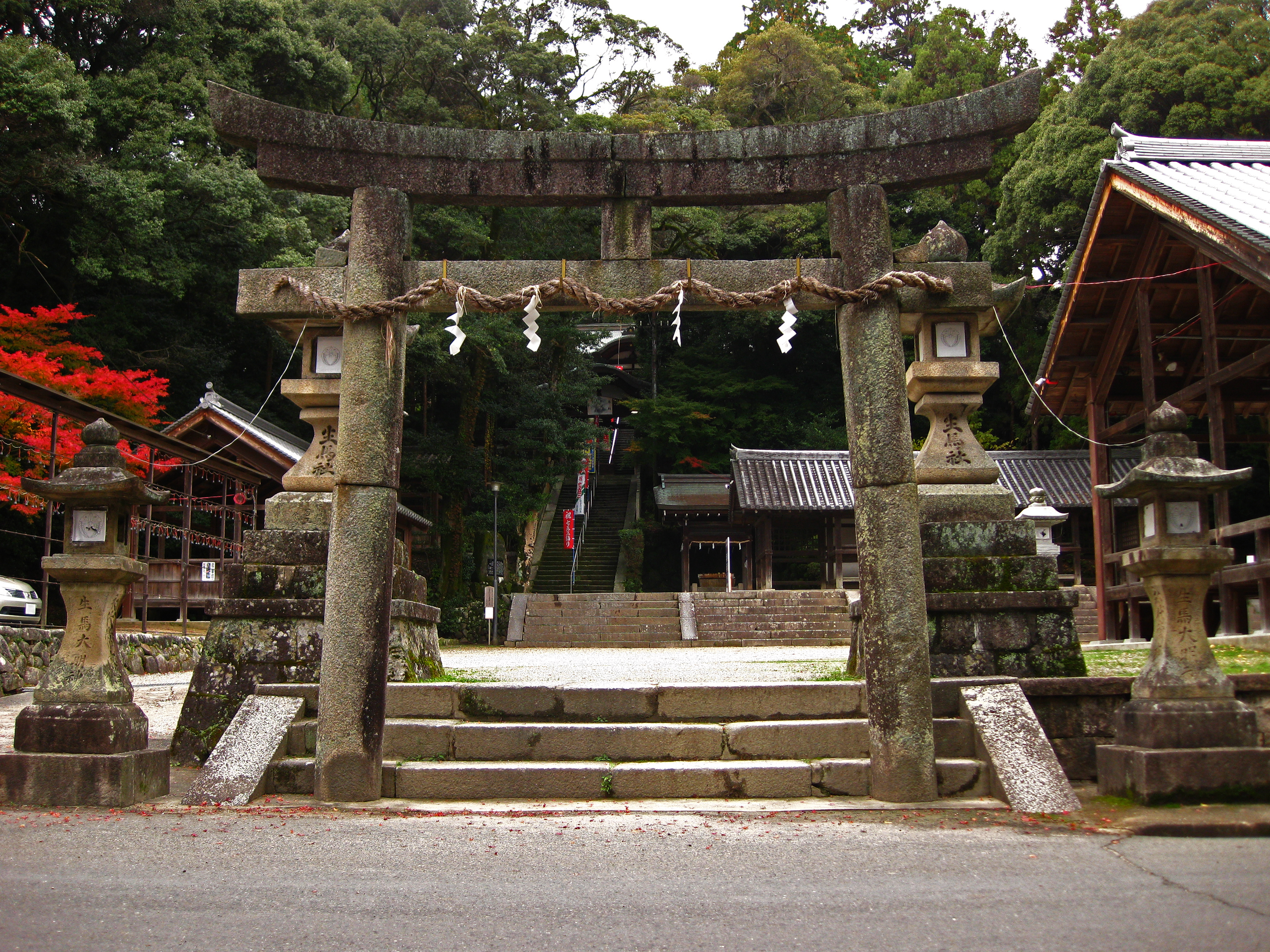
A torii at Ikoma Jinja
