= Tanzan Shrine =

Shinto shrine in Sakurai, Nara Prefecture, Japan

Tanzan Shrine 談山神社
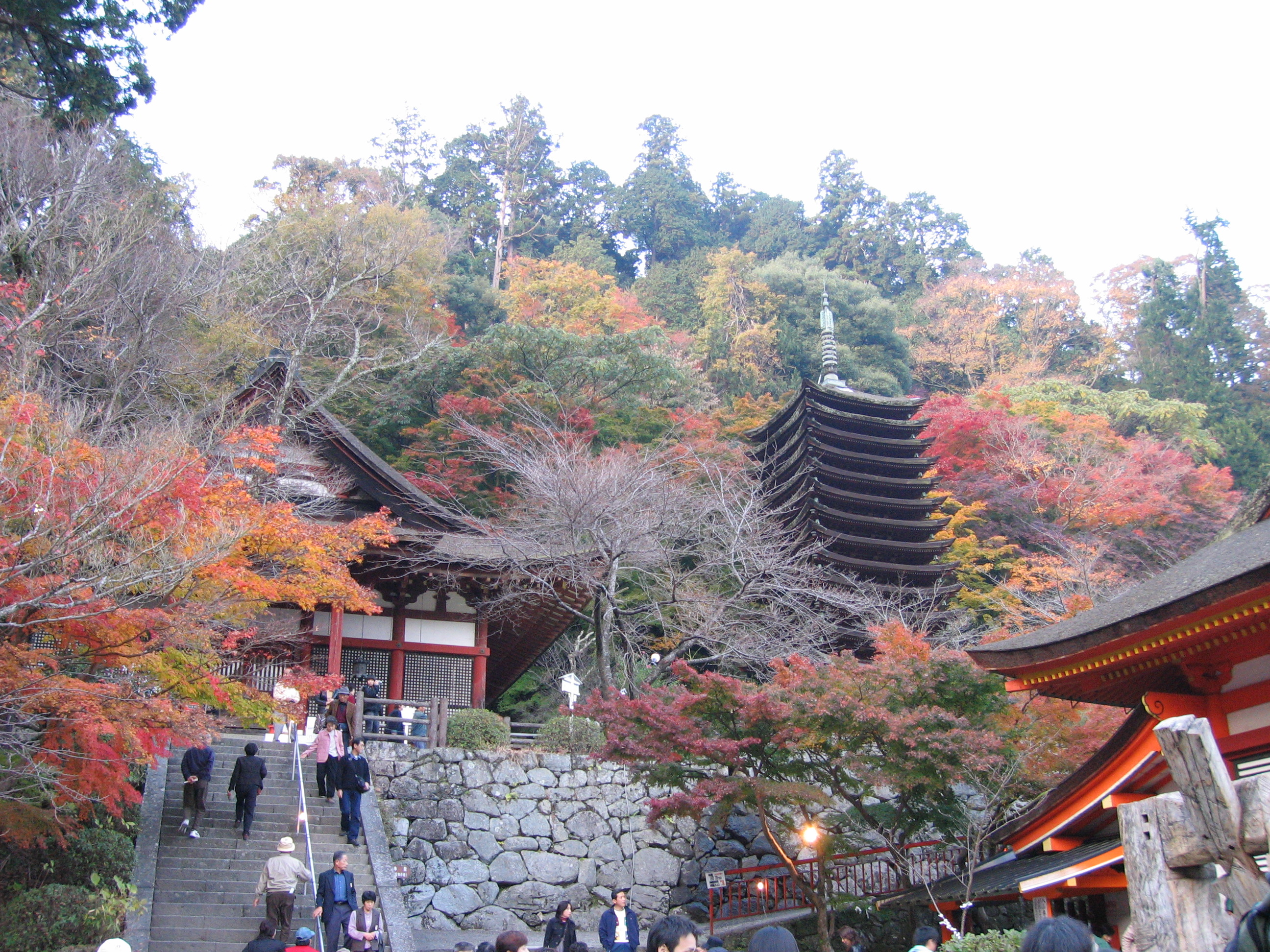
- Pagoda of Tanzan Shrine

- Location within Japan

Religion
- Affiliation: Shinto
- Deity: Fujiwara no Kamatari

Location
- Location: 319 Tōnomine, Sakurai-shi, Nara-ken 〒633-0032
- Interactive map of Tanzan Shrine 談山神社
- Coordinates: 34°27′57″N 135°51′42″E

Architecture
- Founder: Jo'e
- Established: 678

Website
- www.tanzan.or.jp

Tanzan Shrine (談山神社, Tanzan-jinja), also known as the Danzan Shrine, the Tōnomine Shrine (多武峯社, Tōnomine-sha) and the Tōnomine Temple (多武峯寺, Tōnomine-ji), is a Shinto shrine in Sakurai, Nara Prefecture, Japan. It is located 5 km from Ishibutai Kofun.

== History ==
The shrine traces its origin to a Tendai temple built in the Asuka period (538 – 710) called Tōnomine-ji, built by the monk Jo'e (643 – 666). Jo'e was the oldest son of Fujiwara no Kamatari (614 – 669), founder of the Fujiwara clan. Jo'e located the temple on Tōnomine, a peak of on the southern side of Mount Goharetsu (619 metres (2,031 ft)). Jo'e moved the remains of Kamatari to a 13-story pagoda on the site. During the Heian period, the temple developed together with the prosperity of the Fujiwara clan. The emperors Daigo (884 – 930) and Go-Hanazono (1419 – 1471) attached special reverence to the temple, and bestowed it with various honorifics.

Under shinbutsu-shūgō, a system of syncretism of Buddhism and kami worship, the site was both a Shinto shrine and a Buddhist temple. The Tanzan Shrine and Tōnomine-ji coexisted on the same site. Tōnomine-ji had two subtemples located within its precincts, Myōraku-ji (妙楽寺) and Shōryō-in (聖霊院). The shrine received significant financial support from the Tokugawa bakufu during the Edo period (1603 – 1868).

During the anti-Buddhist shinbutsu bunri movement after the Meiji Restoration of 1868, Tanzan Shrine was designated solely as a Shinto shrine dedicated to the worship of the kami of Fujiwara no Kamatari. The Buddhist structures of the shrine were rededicated as Shinto structures. Under the Modern system of ranked Shinto Shrines, the Tanzan Shrine was designated a bekkaku kanreisha in 1874, an Imperial shrine of special status. The shrine lost this designation after the abolition of the ranked shrine system after World War II.

== Structures ==
The present thirteen-story wooden pagoda was built in 1532, and is a reconstruction of the structure built by Jo'e in the Asuka Period. The pagoda is designated an Important Cultural Properties of Japan. The honden, or main hall, is built in the Kasuga-zukuri style. It is dedicated to Fujiwara no Kamatari.

== Kemari Matsuri ==
A Kemari Matsuri, or kickball festival, is held every year on April 29 and the second Sunday in November. On this day, people in ancient costumes and arranged in a circle play a form of football in which they kick a ball made of deerskin to each other.

== Gallery ==

Thirteen-storied pagoda

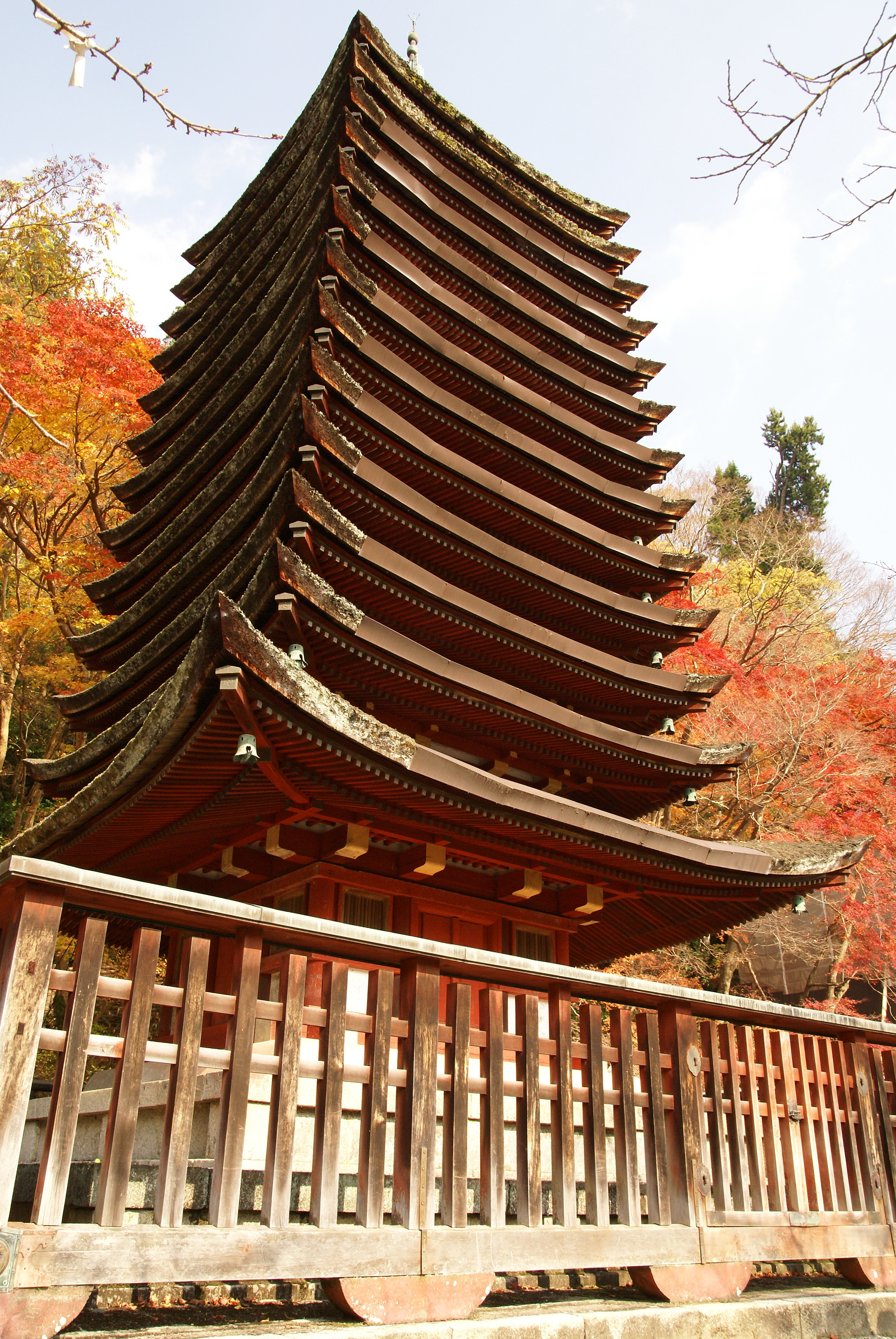

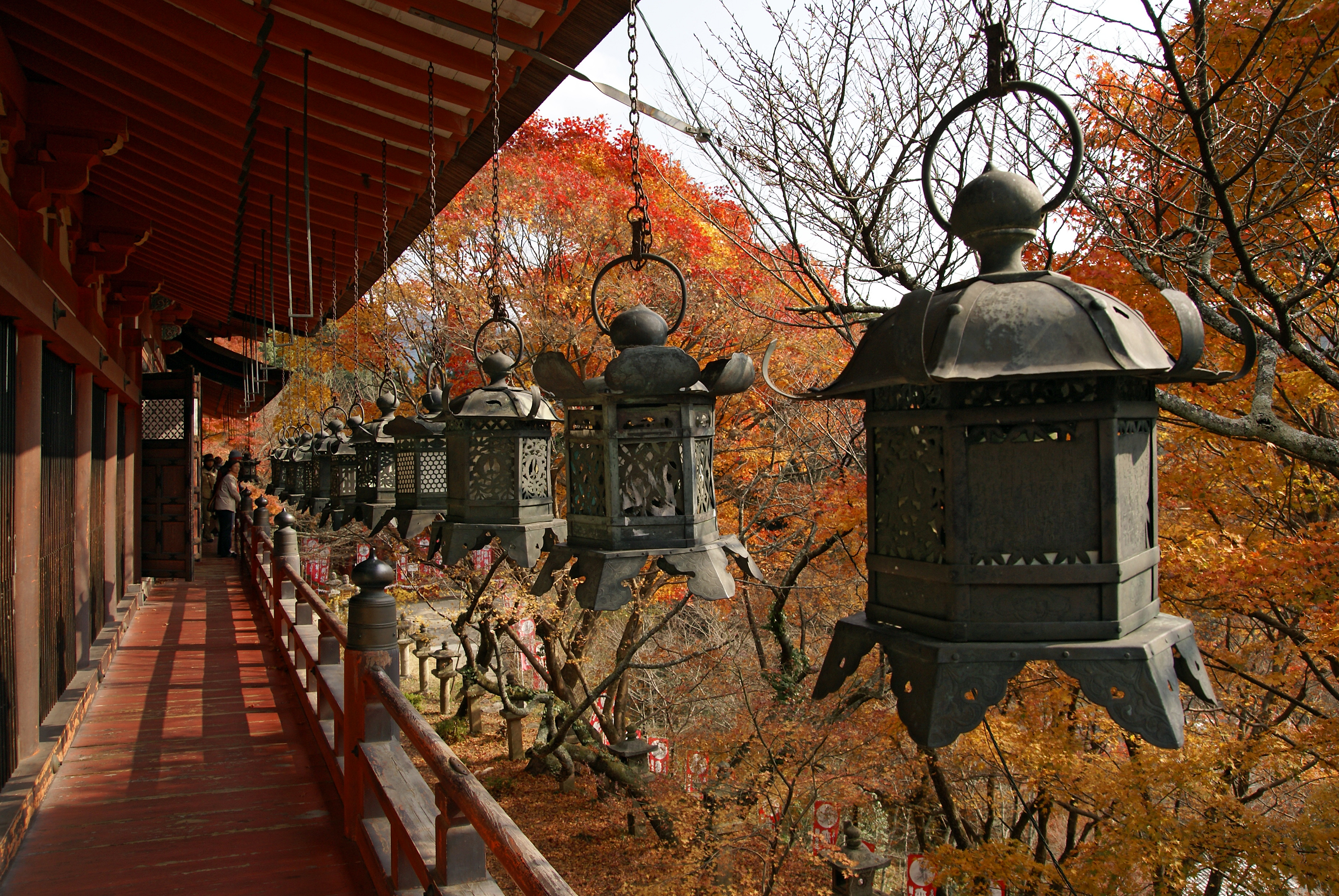
Lanterns

A secondary building at the shrine.

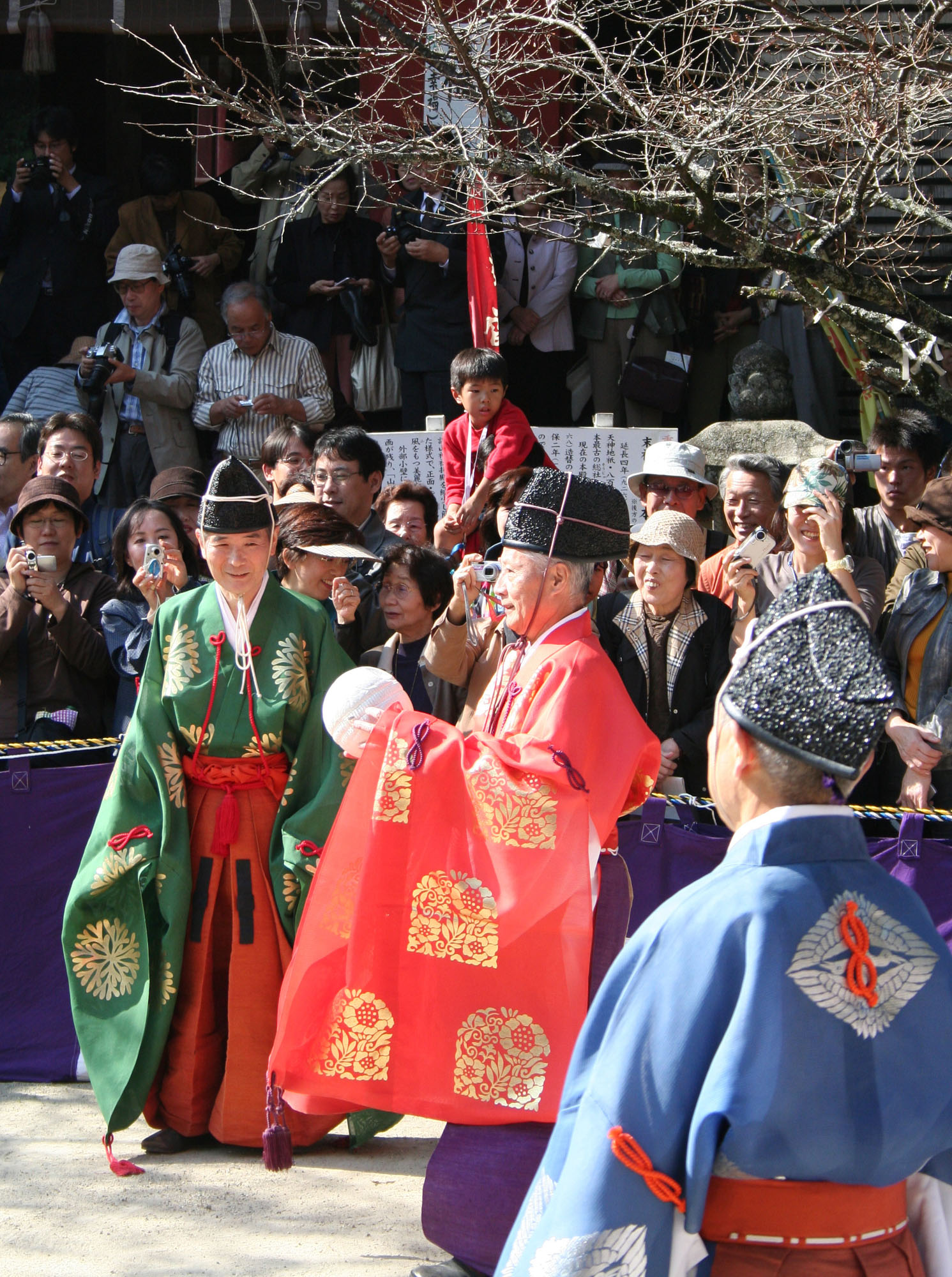
Kemari Matsuri at the shrine

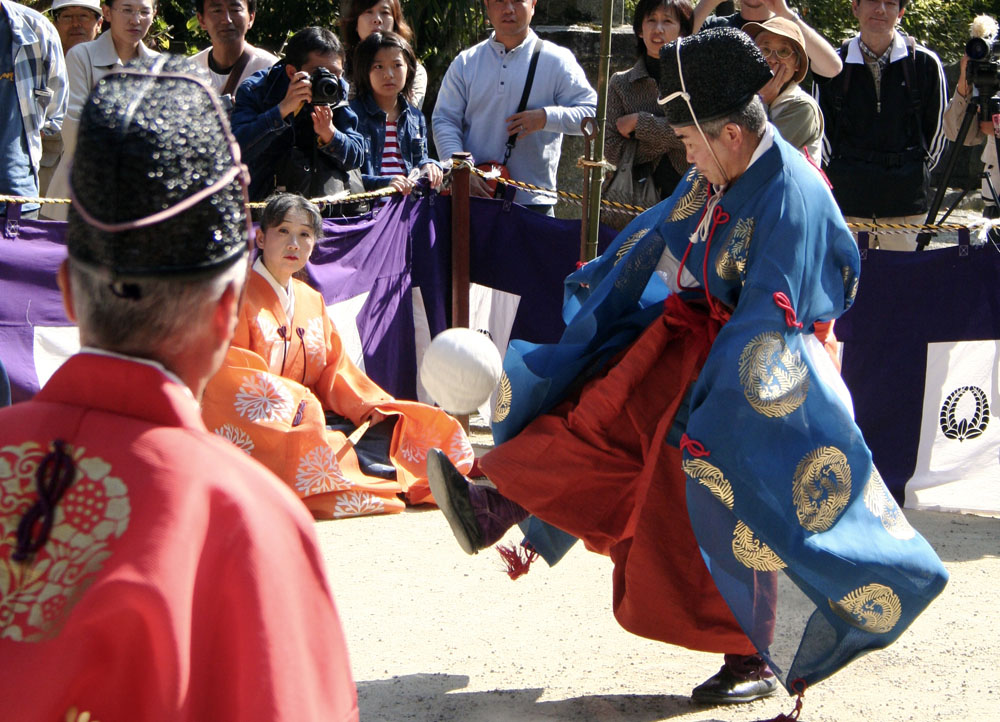
Kemari Matsuri at the shrine
