= List of cultural properties of Japan – archaeological materials (Nara) =

This list is of the cultural properties of Japan designated in the category of archaeological materials (考古資料, kōko shiryō) for the Prefecture of Nara.

== National Cultural Properties ==
As of 1 November 2015, forty-eight Important Cultural Properties (including seven *National Treasures) have been designated, being of national significance.

Property	Date	Municipality	Ownership	Comments	Image	Coordinates	Ref.
*Objects used in the consecration of the Kōfuku-ji Kondō 興福寺金堂鎮壇具; Kōfukuji kondō chindangu	c.710	Tokyo	Kōfuku-ji (kept at Tokyo National Museum)			35°43′07″N 139°46′27″E	
*Seven-Branched Sword 七支刀 shichi-shi tō	Kofun period	Tenri	Isonokami Jingū	replica pictured		34°35′52″N 135°47′35″E	
*Fukubachi from the Ōbara-dera three-storey pagoda, Yamato Province 大和国粟原寺三重塔伏鉢; Yamato no kuni Ōbaradera sanjūnotō fusebachi	715	Nara	Tanzan Jinja (kept at Nara National Museum)			34°40′59″N 135°50′17″E	
*Objects used in the consecration of the Tōdai-ji Kondō 東大寺金堂鎭壇具; Tōdaiji kondō chindangu	c.750	Nara	Tōdai-ji (kept at Nara National Museum)			34°40′59″N 135°50′17″E	
*Artefacts excavated from Fujinoki Kofun, Nara Prefecture 奈良県藤ノ木古墳出土品; Nara-ken Fujinoki kofun shutsudo-hin	Kofun period	Kashihara	Agency for Cultural Affairs (kept at The Museum, Archaeological Institute of Kashihara, Nara Prefecture)			34°29′32″N 135°47′29″E	
*Stone with Buddha footprint 仏足石; Bussokuseki	753	Nara	Yakushi-ji			34°40′07″N 135°47′04″E	
*Stele with verses in praise of the stone with Buddha footprint 仏足跡歌碑; Bussokuseki kahi	c.750	Nara	Yakushi-ji			34°40′07″N 135°47′04″E	
Artefacts excavated from the Hachigatamine Sutra Mound, Iki Province 壱岐形嶺経塚出土品; Iki Hachigatamine kyōzuka shutsudo-hin	1071	Nara	National Institutes for Cultural Heritage (kept at Nara National Museum)			34°40′59″N 135°50′17″E	
Kasatōba 笠塔婆 kasatōba	1261	Nara	Hannya-ji	pair of kasatōba		34°42′00″N 135°50′10″E	
Copper sutra container with talc outer container 滑石外筒／銅経筒／法華種子曼茶羅・真言等陰刻／伝福岡県出土 kasseki soto-zutsu dō kyōzutsu	1141	Nara	National Institutes for Cultural Heritage (kept at Nara National Museum)	incised with a Lotus Seed Mandala; said to have been excavated in Fukuoka Prefecture		34°40′59″N 135°50′17″E	
Gilt bronze epitaph for Yamashiro no Imiki Masaka 金銅山代忌寸真作墓誌 kondō Yamashiro no Imiki Masaka boshi	728	Nara	National Institutes for Cultural Heritage (kept at Nara National Museum)			34°40′59″N 135°50′17″E	
Gilt bronze sutra container in the shape of a hōtō Bronze Nyorai 金銅宝塔形経筒 銅造如来立像 kondō hōtō-gata kyōzutsu dōzō Nyorai ryū-zō	1116	Nara	National Institutes for Cultural Heritage (kept at Nara National Museum)			34°40′59″N 135°50′17″E	
Artefacts excavated from the platform of the Gangō-ji pagoda 元興寺塔址土壇出土品〈玉類銅銭其他一切／〉 Gangōji tō ato dodan shutsudo-hin (tamarui dōsen sonota issai)	Nara period	Nara	National Institutes for Cultural Heritage (kept at Nara National Museum)			34°40′59″N 135°50′17″E	
Artefacts excavated from Takamatsuzuka Kofun 高松塚古墳出土品; Takamatsuzuka kofun shutsudo-hin	Kofun period	Asuka	National Institutes for Cultural Heritage (kept at Asuka Historical Museum)			34°29′04″N 135°49′30″E	
Artefacts excavated from the tomb of priest Dōyaku at Sai-dera 佐井寺僧道薬墓出土品; Saidera no sō Dōyaku bo shutsudo-hin	714	Nara	National Institutes for Cultural Heritage (kept at Nara National Museum)			34°40′59″N 135°50′17″E	
Plaque with Buddhist Triad 三尊甎佛 sanzon senbutsu	Nara period	Nara	Ryōsen-ji			34°40′24″N 135°44′33″E	
Haniwa in the form of a cow 埴輪牛 haniwa ushi	Kofun period	Tawaramoto	Karako-Kagi Archaeological Museum			34°33′27″N 135°48′09″E	
Haniwa in the form of a falconer 埴輪鷹狩男子像 haniwa takagari danshi zō	Kofun period	Nara	Kintetsu (kept at Yamato Bunkakan)			34°41′43″N 135°45′24″E	
Haniwa in the form of a cross-legged boy 埴輪男子胡坐像 haniwa danshi koza-zō	Kofun period	Nara	Tenri University (kept at Tenri University Sankōkan Museum)			34°35′41″N 135°50′47″E	
Haniwa in the form of a standing male 埴輪男子立像 haniwa danshi ryū-zō	Kofun period	Nara	Kintetsu (kept at Yamato Bunkakan)			34°41′43″N 135°45′24″E	
Haniwa in the form of a standing armed boy 埴輪武装男子立像 haniwa busō danshi ryū-zō	Kofun period	Nara	Tenri University (kept at Tenri University Sankōkan Museum)			34°35′41″N 135°50′47″E	
Earthenware vessel in the form of a water jar 水注形土器 suichū-gata doki	Yayoi period	Kashihara	Nara Prefecture (kept at The Museum, Archaeological Institute of Kashihara, Nara Prefecture)			34°29′32″N 135°47′29″E	
Celadon bowl 青磁鉢／奈良県奈良市菩提山町正暦寺境内出土 seiji bachi	Kamakura period	Nara	Shōryaku-ji (正暦寺)	excavated from the precinct of Shōryaku-ji; from the Southern Song kilns at Longquan		34°38′41″N 135°52′06″E	
Artefacts excavated from the Isonokami Jingū kinsokuchi 石上神宮禁足地出土品; Isonokami Jingū kinsokuchi shutsudo-hin	Kofun period	Nara	National Institutes for Cultural Heritage (kept at Nara National Museum)			34°40′59″N 135°50′17″E	
Image of Zaō Gongen incised in a mirror 線刻蔵王権現鏡像 senkoku Zaō Gongen kyōzō	Heian period	Nara	Kimpusen-ji (kept at Nara National Museum)			34°40′59″N 135°50′17″E	
Epitaph of Ō no Yasumaro 太安萬侶墓誌／癸亥年七月六日在銘／奈良県奈良市此瀬町出土; Ō no Yasumaro boshi	723	Kashihara	Agency for Cultural Affairs (kept at The Museum, Archaeological Institute of Kashihara, Nara Prefecture)			34°29′32″N 135°47′29″E	
Artefacts dedicated in a gorintō from Kakuan-ji, Yamato Province 大和額安寺五輪塔納置品; Yamato Gakuanji gorintō nōchi-hin	1303/26	Yamatokōriyama	Agency for Cultural Affairs (kept at Kakuan-ji (額安寺))			34°36′03″N 135°46′20″E	
Artefacts excavated from Gobōyama No.3 Tumulus, Yamato Province 大和御坊山第三号墳出土品; Yamato Gobōyama daisan-gō fun shutsudo-hin	Kofun period	Kashihara	Nara Prefecture (kept at The Museum, Archaeological Institute of Kashihara, Nara Prefecture)			34°29′32″N 135°47′29″E	
Artefacts excavated from the Kimpusen Sutra Mound, Yamato Province 大和国金峯山経塚出土品; Yamato no kuni Kinpusen kyōzuka shutsudo-hin	1007	Nara	National Institutes for Cultural Heritage (kept at Nara National Museum)			34°40′59″N 135°50′17″E	
Artefacts excavated from Kengoshizuka Kofun, Takaichi District, Yamato Province 大和国高市郡牽牛子塚古墳出土品; Yamato no kuni Takaichi-gun Kengoshizuka kofun shutsudo-hin	Kofun period	Kashihara	Nara Prefecture (kept at The Museum, Archaeological Institute of Kashihara, Nara Prefecture)			34°29′32″N 135°47′29″E	
Artefacts excavated from Obitokeyamamura Haiji, Yamato Province 大和国帯解山村廃寺出土品; Yamato no kuni Obitokeyamamura haiji shutsudo-hin	Nara period	Nara	Enshō-ji			34°38′37″N 135°50′44″E	
Artefacts excavated from the tomb of Ninshō at Chikurin-ji, Yamato Province 大和竹林寺忍性墓出土品; Yamato Chikurinji Ninshō bo shutsudo-hin	Kamakura period	Nara	Chikurin-ji			34°40′21″N 135°42′12″E	
Artefacts excavated from the Karako Site, Yamato Province 大和唐古遺跡出土品; Yamato no kuni Karako iseki shutsudo-hin	Yayoi period	Kashihara	Nara Prefecture (kept at The Museum, Archaeological Institute of Kashihara, Nara Prefecture)			34°29′32″N 135°47′29″E	
Artefacts dedicated in the thirteen-storey stone pagoda at Hannya-ji, Yamato Province 大和般若寺石造十三重塔内納置品; Yamato Hannyaji sekizō jūsanjūnotō nai nōchi-hin	Nara to Meiji period	Nara	Hannya-ji			34°42′00″N 135°50′10″E	
Bronze vessel dedicated at the central foundation stone of the pagoda at Hōrin-ji, Yamato Province 大和法輪寺塔心礎納置銅壺; Yamato Hōrinji tō shinso nōchi dōko	Asuka period	Ikaruga	Hōrin-ji			34°42′00″N 135°50′10″E	
Iron shields 鉄盾 testsu tate	Kofun period	Tenri	Isonokami Jingū	pair of shields		34°35′52″N 135°47′35″E	
Tile with tennin design 天人文甎; Tennin-mon sen	Nara period	Kyoto	Oka-dera (kept at Kyoto National Museum)			34°59′24″N 135°46′23″E	
Artefacts excavated from Mesuriyama Kofun, Nara Prefecture 奈良県メスリ山古墳出土品; Nara-ken Mesuriyama kofun shutsudo-hin	Kofun period	Kashihara	Nara Prefecture (kept at The Museum, Archaeological Institute of Kashihara, Nara Prefecture)			34°29′32″N 135°47′29″E	
Artefacts excavated from the Kashihara Site, Nara Prefecture 奈良県橿原遺跡出土品; Nara-ken Kashihara iseki shutsudo-hin	Jōmon period	Kashihara	Nara Prefecture (kept at The Museum, Archaeological Institute of Kashihara, Nara Prefecture)			34°29′32″N 135°47′29″E	
Artefacts excavated an earthen grave in the old precinct of Kōfuku-ji, Nara Prefecture 奈良県興福寺旧境内土壙（一乗院宸殿跡下層）出土品; Nara-ken Kōfukuji kyū-keidai dokō (Ichijōin shinden ato kasō) shutsudo-hin	Nara period	Nara	National Institutes for Cultural Heritage (kept at Nara National Research Institute for Cultural Properties)	from the lower layer of the site of the Ichijō-in (一乗院) Shinden		34°29′32″N 135°47′29″E	
Artefacts excavated from Kurozuka Kofun, Nara Prefecture 奈良県黒塚古墳出土品; Nara-ken Kurozuka kofun shutsudo-hin	Kofun period	Kashihara	Agency for Cultural Affairs (kept at The Museum, Archaeological Institute of Kashihara, Nara Prefecture)			34°29′32″N 135°47′29″E	
Artefacts excavated from the site of Yamada-dera, Nara Prefecture 奈良県山田寺跡出土品; Nara-ken Yamadadera ato shutsudo-hin	Asuka to Heian period	Asuka	National Institutes for Cultural Heritage (kept at Asuka Historical Museum)			34°29′04″N 135°49′30″E	
Artefacts excavated from the Ōminesanchō Site, Nara Prefecture 奈良県大峯山頂遺跡出土品; Nara-ken Ōminesanchō iseki shutsudo-hin	Nara to Heian period	Kashihara	Kimpusen-ji (kept at The Museum, Archaeological Institute of Kashihara, Nara Prefecture)			34°29′32″N 135°47′29″E	
Artefacts excavated from Tenjinyama Kofun, Nara Prefecture 奈良県天神山古墳出土品; Nara-ken Tenjinyama kofun shutsudo-hin	Kofun period	Nara	National Institutes for Cultural Heritage (kept at Nara National Museum)			34°40′59″N 135°50′17″E	
Artefacts excavated from Shimanoyama Kofun, Nara Prefecture 奈良県島の山古墳出土品; Nara-ken Shimanoyama kofun shutsudo-hin	Kofun period	Kashihara	Agency for Cultural Affairs (kept at The Museum, Archaeological Institute of Kashihara, Nara Prefecture)			34°29′32″N 135°47′29″E	
Tile with phoenix design 鳳凰文甎 hōō-mon sen	Nara period	Takatori	Minami Hokke-ji (南法華寺)			34°25′34″N 135°48′37″E	
Wooden miniature hyakumantō Wooden pagoda with fragmentary lotus pedestal Wooden pagoda with lotus pedestal 木造百万小塔 木造十万節塔（残欠蓮座付） 木造一万節塔（蓮座付） mokuzō hyakumanshōtō mokuzō jūmansetsutō (zanketsu renge-zatsu ki) mokuzō ichimansetsutō (renge-zatsu ki)	770	Nara	Hōryū-ji	one hundred miniature wooden pagodas, with two further wooden pagodas		34°36′51″N 135°44′08″E	
Shibi fragments 鴟尾残闕 shibi zanketsu	Asuka period	Nara	Hōrin-ji (kept at Nara National Museum)			34°40′59″N 135°50′17″E	

== Prefectural Cultural Properties ==
As of 1 May 2015, fourteen properties have been designated at a prefectural level.

Property	Date	Municipality	Ownership	Comments	Image	Coordinates	Ref.
Old mirror 古鏡 ko-kyō	Nara period	Nara	private	one mirror			for all refs see
Wooden coffins excavated from the Mikuradō Pond 三倉堂池出土木棺; Mikuradō-ike shutsudo mokkan	late Kofun period	Yamatotakada	Yamatotakada City	six coffins			
Large Sue ware vessel 須恵大甕; Sue ō-kame	late Kofun period	Tenri	Isonokami Jingū			34°35′53″N 135°51′07″E	
Jewel-headed tachi 圭頭大刀; Keitō tachi	Asuka period	Kashihara	Nara Prefecture (kept at The Museum, Archaeological Institute of Kashihara, Nara Prefecture)	one item		34°29′32″N 135°47′29″E	
Dōtaku 銅鐸; Dōtaku	mid-Yayoi period	Kashihara	Nara Prefecture (kept at The Museum, Archaeological Institute of Kashihara, Nara Prefecture)	one item		34°29′32″N 135°47′29″E	
Artefacts excavated from Shimoikeyama Kofun 下池山古墳出土品; Shimoikeyama kofun shutsudo-hin	Kofun period	Kashihara	Nara Prefecture (kept at The Museum, Archaeological Institute of Kashihara, Nara Prefecture)			34°29′32″N 135°47′29″E	
Wooden coffin excavated from Yamato Tenjinyama Kofun 大和天神山古墳出土木棺; Yamato Tenjinyama kofun shutsudo mokkan	early Kofun period	Kashihara	Nara Prefecture (kept at The Museum, Archaeological Institute of Kashihara, Nara Prefecture)	fragments from one burial		34°29′32″N 135°47′29″E	
Artefacts excavated from Hokenoyama Kofun ホケノ山古墳出土品; Hokenoyama kofun shutsudo-hin	Kofun period	Kashihara	Nara Prefecture (kept at The Museum, Archaeological Institute of Kashihara, Nara Prefecture)			34°29′32″N 135°47′29″E	
Dōtaku with surplice design 袈裟襷文銅鐸; Kesadasuki-mon dōtaku	late Yayoi period	Sakurai	Sakurai City	one item			
Artefacts excavated from Kanmakikudo No.3 Tumulus 上牧久渡3号墳出土品; Kanmakikudo san-gō-fun shutsudo-hin	early Kofun period	Kanmaki	Kanmaki Town				
Stone tō and reliquary excavated from Daruma-ji 達磨寺出土石塔及び舎利容器; Darumaji shutsudo seki-tō oyobi shari yōki	Kamakura period	Ōji	Daruma-ji (達磨寺)			34°35′23″N 135°42′25″E	
Artefacts dedicated in a gorintō from Sugō-ji 菅生寺五輪塔納置品; Sugōji gorintō nōchi-hin	Yuan dynasty/Kamakura period	Yoshino	Yoshino Town				
Artefacts excavated from Miyataki Site 宮滝遺跡出土品; Miyataki iseki shutsudo-hin	Jōmon period	Yoshino	Yoshino Town	1,621 items			
Fragments of a hairline-engraved image of Zaō Gongen excavated from Mount Ōmine 大峯山出土蔵王権現毛彫像残欠; Ōminesan shutsudo Zaō Gongen kechōzō zanketsu	Heian period	Tenkawa	Ryūsen-ji (龍泉寺)			34°16′09″N 135°52′44″E	

== Municipal Cultural Properties ==
Properties designated at a municipal level include:

Property	Date	Municipality	Ownership	Comments	Image	Coordinates	Ref.
Mirror inscribed with a triangle pattern, deities, and beasts 三角縁吾作銘二神二獣鏡 sankaku buchi gosaku mei nishin nijū kyō	C3	Nara	Miroku-ji (弥勒寺)	designation includes accompanying two accompanying documents		34°40′18″N 135°44′54″E	
Artefacts excavated from Benshozuka Kofun ベンショ塚古墳出土品; Benshozuka kofun shutsudo-hin	Kofun period	Nara	Nara City (kept at Nara City Buried Cultural Properties Research Centre)			34°40′13″N 135°48′13″E	
House-shaped haniwa and haniwa fragments excavated from Sugiyama Kofun 杉山古墳出土家形埴輪 附 埴輪残欠一括; Sugiyama kofun shutsudo iegata haniwa tsuketari haniwa zanketsu ikkatsu	Kofun period	Nara	Nara City (kept at Nara City Buried Cultural Properties Research Centre)			34°40′13″N 135°48′13″E	
Copper vessel-shaped weight 銅製壷形分銅 dōsei tsubo katachi fundō	Nara period	Nara	Nara City (kept at Nara City Buried Cultural Properties Research Centre)	one item		34°40′13″N 135°48′13″E	
Jingū-kaihō casting equipment excavated from the Heijō-kyō Sakyō Rokujō Ichibō Jūroku Tsubo Site 平城京左京六条一坊十六坪出土神功開宝鋳銭遺物; Heijō-kyō Sakyō Rokujō Ichibō jūroku tsubo shutsudo jingū kaihō chūsen ibutsu	Nara period	Nara	Nara City (kept at Nara City Buried Cultural Properties Research Centre)	forty-seven items, including four crucibles		34°40′13″N 135°48′13″E	
Kōfuku-ji mandala stone 興福寺曼荼羅石; Kōfukuji mandara ishi	Kamakura period	Nara	Jūrin-in (十輪院)			34°40′35″N 135°50′00″E	
Earthenware with line-engraved human figures excavated from the Tsuboi Site 坪井遺跡出土 人物線刻画土器; Tsuboi iseki shutsudo jinbutsu senkoku-ga doki	mid-Yayoi period	Kashihara	Kashihara Museum of History (橿原市歴史に憩う橿原市博物館)			34°28′46″N 135°46′19″E	

== See also ==
- List of National Treasures of Japan (archaeological materials)
- Nara National Research Institute for Cultural Properties
