= Archaeological Institute of Kashihara, Nara Prefecture =

- 奈良県立橿原考古学研究所
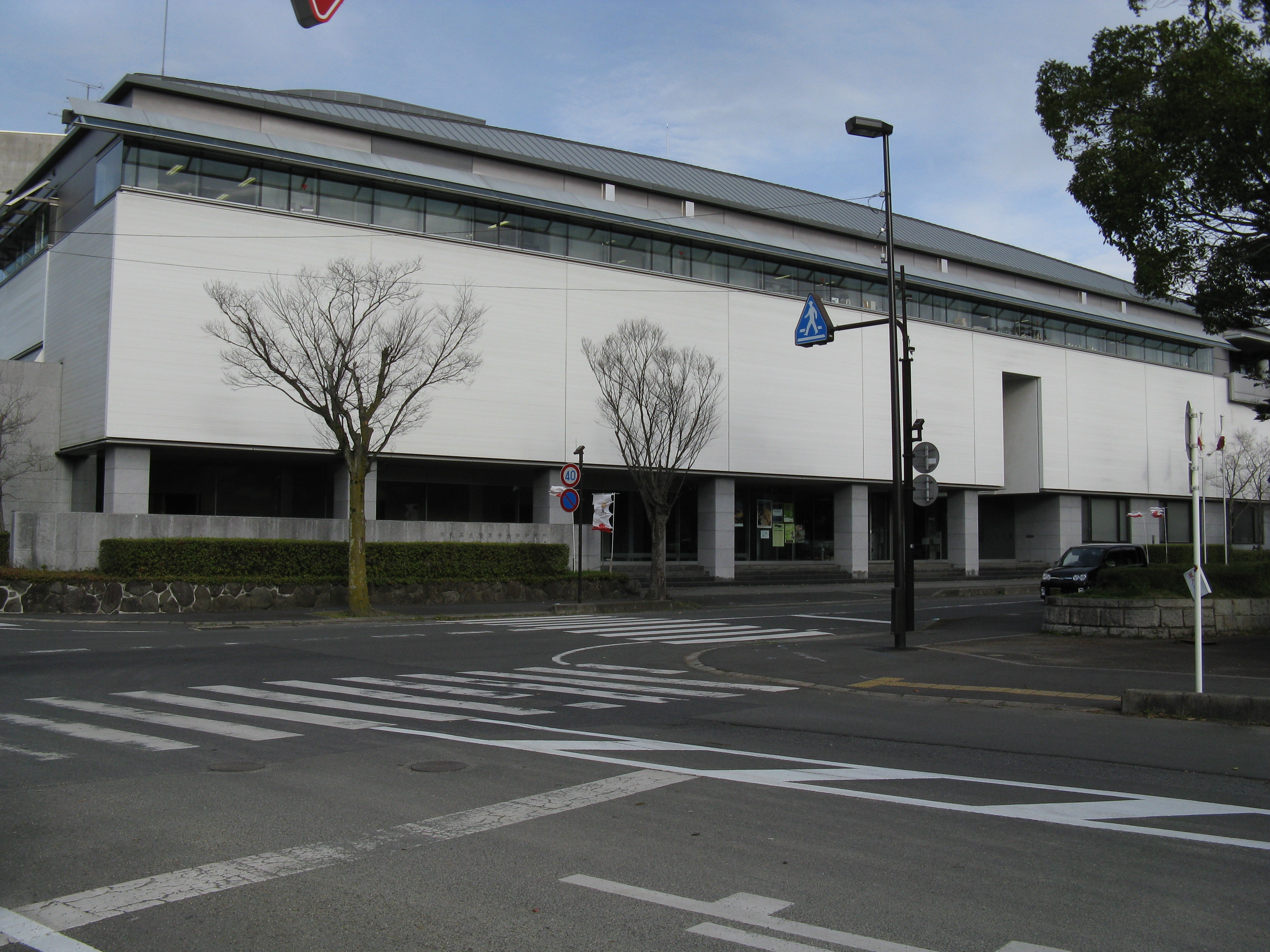

General information
- Location: 1 Unebi-chō, Kashihara, Nara Prefecture, Japan
- Coordinates: 34°29′32″N 135°47′29″E
- Opened: 1938

Website
- Official website

Archaeological Institute of Kashihara, Nara Prefecture (奈良県立橿原考古学研究, Nara Kenritsu Kashihara Kōkogaku Kenkyūsho) is archaeological institute in Kashihara, Nara Prefecture, Japan.

The Archaeological Institute of Kashihara was established in 1938 in connection with Kashihara Jingū's preparations for the 2,600th anniversary celebrations of the legendary foundation of Japan in 660 BC by Emperor Jimmu.

== Museum ==
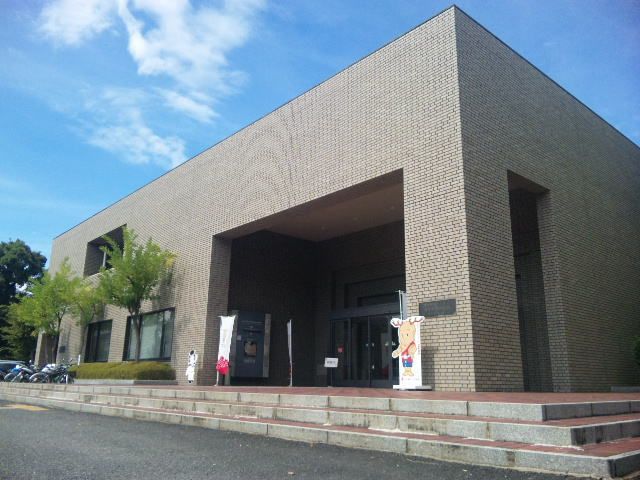
The Museum

The Museum, Archaeological Institute of Kashihara, Nara Prefecture (奈良県立橿原考古学研究所附属博物館, Nara Kenritsu Kashihara Kōkogaku Kenkyūsho Fuzoku Hakubutsukan) first opened under another name in Kashihara, Nara Prefecture, Japan, in 1940. The collection includes artefacts excavated from Fujinoki Kofun that have been designated a National Treasure. In addition to the permanent display, there are two special exhibitions each year, in spring and autumn.

=== History ===
In 1940, the Yamato Provincial Museum (大和国史館) opened and in 1949 this was renamed the Yamato History Museum (大和歴史館). With the Museum Act (博物館法) of 1951, it gained the status of a museum-equivalent facility. Its formal registration as a museum proper was in 1968, a year after the move to a new building. In 1970, it was renamed the Kashihara Park Archaeological Museum (橿原公苑考古博物館), and in 1973 the Nara Prefectural Museum of Archaeology (奈良県立考古博物館), becoming the Archaeological Institute Museum (研究所附属考古博物館) a year later. In April 1980, the Museum gained its current name. A new hall opened in October that year; this was renewed in 1997.

== See also ==
- List of National Treasures of Japan (archaeological materials)
- Nara National Research Institute for Cultural Properties
- List of Historic Sites of Japan (Nara)
- List of Cultural Properties of Japan - historical materials (Nara)
- List of Cultural Properties of Japan - archaeological materials (Nara)
- Nara National Museum
- Kashihara Shrine
