= Nara Municipal Buried Cultural Properties Research Centre =

- 奈良市埋蔵文化財調査センター
- Interactive map of the Nara Municipal Buried Cultural Properties Research Centre area

General information
- Location: 2-Chōme 281 Daianji-nishi, Nara, Nara Prefecture, Japan
- Coordinates: 34°40′13″N 135°48′13″E
- Opened: 1 September 1983

Website
- Official website

Nara Municipal Buried Cultural Properties Research Centre (奈良市埋蔵文化財調査センター, Nara-shi maizō bunkazai chōsa sentā) opened in Nara, Japan, in 1983. It moved to a new building in 1999. The Centre is involved in the excavation, investigation, preservation, and promotion of the area's archaeological heritage, and operates an exhibition hall.

== See also ==
- Nara National Museum
- Nara National Research Institute for Cultural Properties
- List of Historic Sites of Japan (Nara)
- List of Cultural Properties of Japan - historical materials (Nara)
- List of Cultural Properties of Japan - archaeological materials (Nara)
- Heijō Palace
