= Chikurinji =

Chikurinji may mean:

- 9153 Chikurinji, an asteroid discovered in 1981
- Chikurin-ji (竹林寺), a Japanese Buddhist temple in Ikoma, Nara Prefecture
- Chikurin-ji (Kōchi), a Japanese Buddhist temple in Kōchi, Kōchi Prefecture
