= Tokyo National Research Institute for Cultural Properties =

Japanese cultural research institute

Coordinates: 35°43′14.57″N 139°46′31.92″E

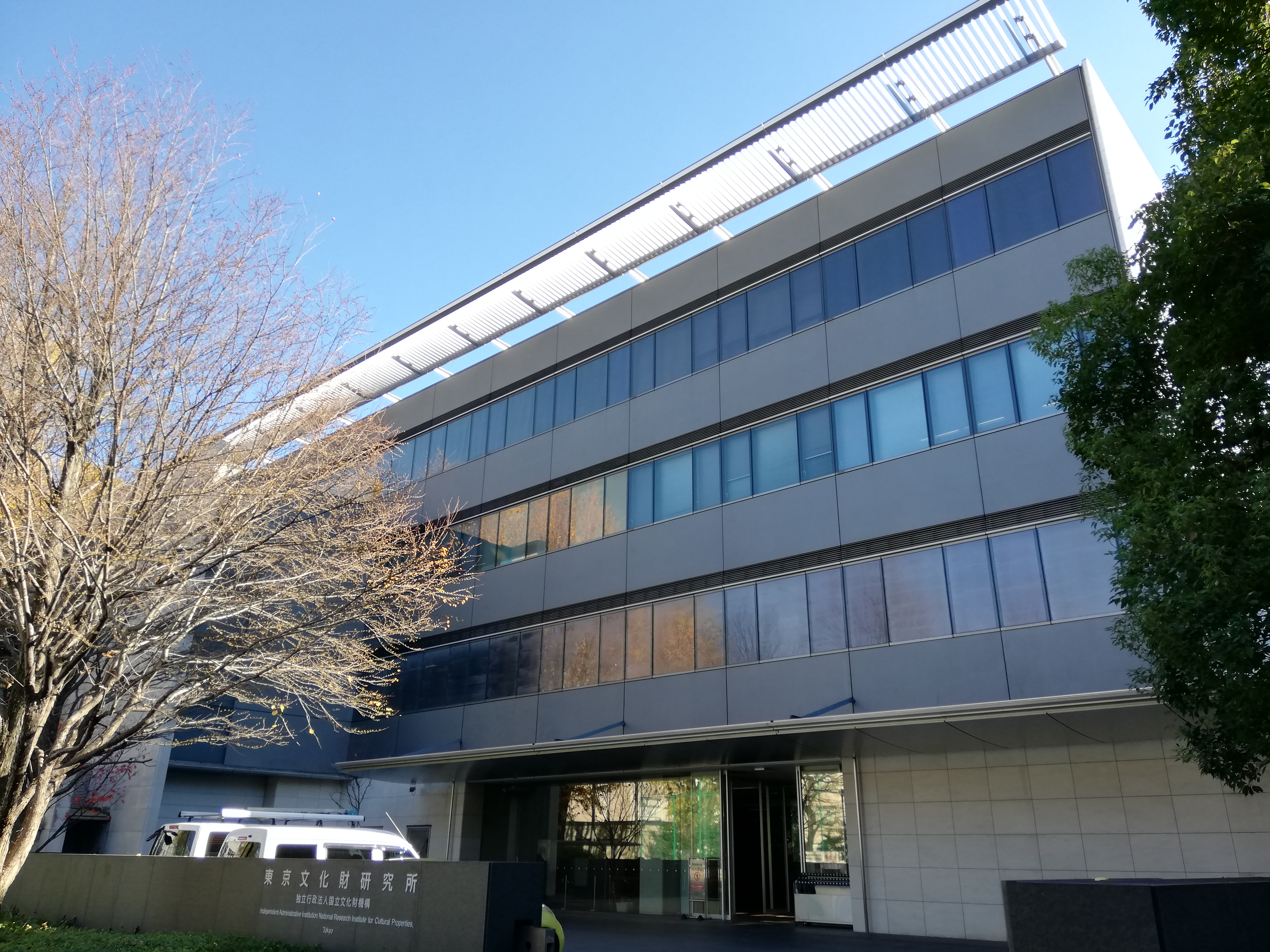

The Tokyo National Research Institute for Cultural Properties (東京文化財研究所, Tōkyō Bunkazai Kenkyū-jo), commonly known as Tobunken, is an institute dedicated to the preservation and utilization of cultural properties. It is one of the two institutes in Japan that comprise the National Institutes for Cultural Heritage, an independent administrative institution created in 2001.

== History ==
The Tobunken was founded in 1930 as the Art Research Institute with an endowment established by Kuroda Seiki, former president of the Imperial Academy of Fine Arts (Japan Art Academy). In 1952, it was reorganized into the Tokyo National Research Institute for Cultural Properties with the establishment of departments of Fine Arts, Performing Arts, Conservation Sciences, and General Affairs. A department of Restoration Techniques was added in 1973 and an archive set up in 1977. The Division of International Cooperation for Conservation was established in 1993 and then converted into the Japan Center for International Exchange in Conservation in 1995, expanding the Institute to its present scale. Also in 1995, a graduate course was established in cooperation with Tokyo University of the Arts(東京芸術大学, Tokyo Geijutsu Daigaku).

In 2001, Independent Administrative Institution National Research Institute for Cultural Properties was created by the merger of the National Research Institute for Cultural Properties, Tokyo, and the National Research Institute for Cultural Properties, Nara.

In 2007, Independent Administrative Institution National Institutes for Cultural Heritage was established by merging two Independent Administrative Institutions: the Independent Administrative Institution National Research Institute for Cultural Properties, which had been created in 2001; plus the Independent Administrative Institution National Museum (the IAI National Museum), also created in 2001. The IAI National Museum had been created by merging the Tokyo National Museum, the Kyoto National Museum, the Nara National Museum in 2001; and the Kyushu National Museum had been incorporated into the organization in 2005.

== Library ==
The Tobunken library houses a large collection of books and materials that serve the various departments of the Tobunken. The library consists of 90,000 books on fine arts, 87,000 periodicals on fine art, 13,000 books on the performing arts, 7,000 books on preservation and restoration techniques, and 260,000 photographs. Some materials are viewable only on microfilm of CD-ROM to prevent damage to the originals.

The Tobunken website also has a number of digital archives with digitized woodblock-printed books and prints from the Edo period. Previews of the rarer periodical runs held in the library's collection can be seen under the "From the Collections" link, which include periodicals on Japanese art and culture from all over the world.

The Library is open on Monday, Wednesday, and Friday except on national holidays and other temporary closures. The library is open from 10:00 to 5:00pm with the reference desk closed from 12:00 to 1:00 and after 4:30. A self-service, black and white copier is available for use at the rate of 10 yen / page. The library can be reached by facsimile at the following number: 03-3823-2372

== Kuroda Memorial Hall ==
The Kuroda Memorial Hall acts as an art museum associated with Tobunken. The Hall itself was the original site of the Art Research Institute after its donation in 1924 as part of the estate of Kuroda Seiki, often considered the father of modern Western-style painting in Japan. In 1928, the Hall was used to display works of art donated by members of Kuroda's family and in 1930 became the Art Research Institute, the former name of the Tobunken. After 2000, when the Tobunken moved to its present location, the Kuroda Memorial Hall as restored to its original appearance and reopened in September 2001. A gallery was added to allow for a greater display of the Hall's collection, including 126 oil paintings, and 170 drawings, sketchbooks, and letters.
