= Karako-Kagi Site =

- 唐古・鍵遺跡 (Japanese)
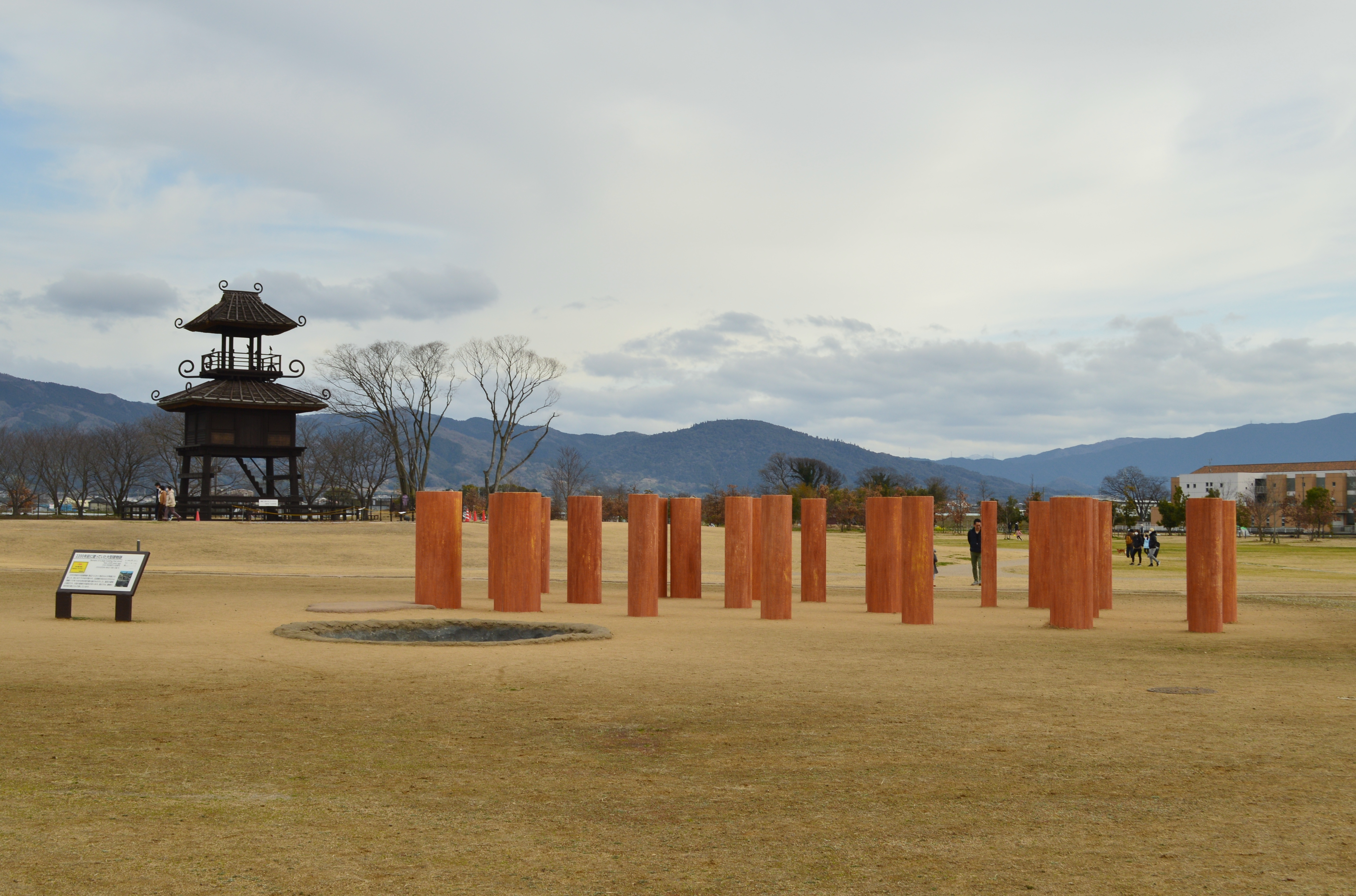
- Interactive map of Karako-Kagi Site

The Karako-Kagi Site is an archaeological site in Tawaramoto, Nara Japan. It has a metallurgical facility, and is near other sites such as the Makimuku ruins. Chicken breeding is known from the site. However no rice paddy fields are associated with it.

== Museum ==
Karako-Kagi Archaeological Museum
- 唐古・鍵考古学ミュージアム
- Interactive map of the Karako-Kagi Archaeological Museum area

General information
- Location: 233-1 Sakate, Tawaramoto, Nara Prefecture, Japan
- Coordinates: 34°33′27″N 135°48′09″E
- Opened: 24 November 2004

Technical details
- Floor area: 352 m^{2}

Website
- Official website

Karako-Kagi Archaeological Museum (唐古・鍵考古学ミュージアム, Karako-Kagi kōkogaku myūjiamu) opened in Tawaramoto, Nara Prefecture, Japan, in 2004. Located on the second floor of the Tawaramoto Aogaki Lifelong Learning Centre (田原本青垣生涯学習センター), the museum's three rooms display artefacts from the nearby Karako-Kagi Site (唐古・鍵遺跡), a Yayoi village and National Historic Site, as well as a haniwa in the form of a cow that has been designated an Important Cultural Property.

== See also ==
- Nara National Museum
- List of Historic Sites of Japan (Nara)
- List of Cultural Properties of Japan - historical materials (Nara)
- List of Cultural Properties of Japan - archaeological materials (Nara)
