= Kashihara Shrine =

Shinto shrine in Kashihara, Japan

Kashihara Shrine 橿原神宮
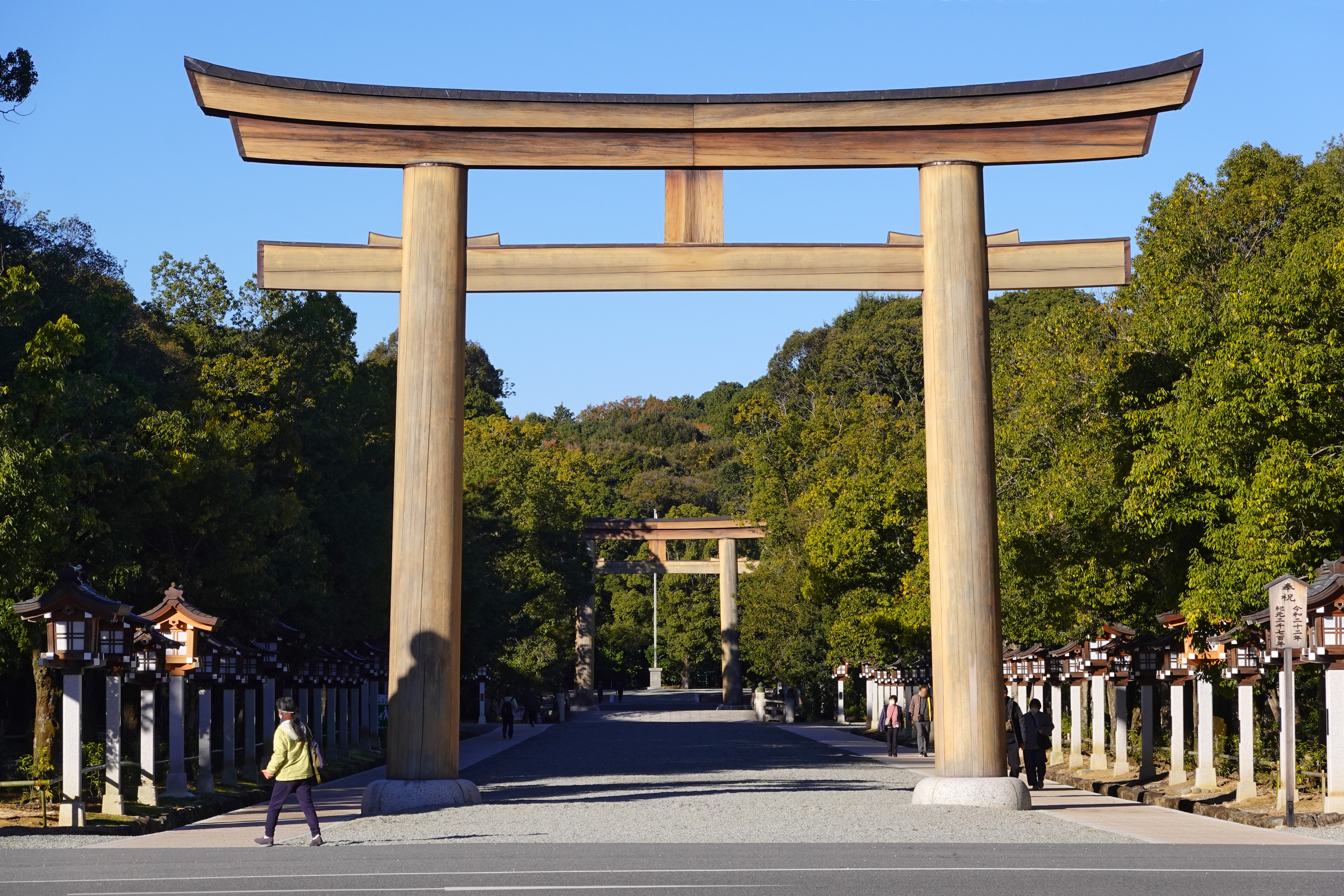
- Omote-sando

- Location within Japan

Religion
- Affiliation: Shinto
- Deity: Emperor Jimmu; Himetataraisuzu-hime
- Festival: Kigensai (February 11)
- Type: Kanpeitaisha; Chokusaisha; Beppyo jinja

Location
- Location: 934 Kume-cho, Kashihara-shi, Nara Prefecture, Japan
- Interactive map of Kashihara Shrine 橿原神宮
- Coordinates: 34°29′18″N 135°47′11″E

Architecture
- Founder: Emperor Meiji
- Established: April 2, 1890

Website
- www.kashiharajingu.or.jp

The Kashihara Shrine (橿原神宮, Kashihara Jingū) is a Shinto shrine located in the city of Kashihara, Nara Prefecture, Japan. The shrine was built in April 2, 1890 at the site of the Kashihara-gū, which is situated on the southeastern side of Mount Unebi of Yamato Sanzan. Japan's first Emperor, Emperor Jimmu, is said to have acceded to the throne on February 11, 660 BC at the Kashihara-gū.

The Mausoleum of Emperor Jimmu is found on the shrine's premises.

Several memorials to placate Japanese military personnel fallen in World War II are placed on the shrine's grounds, including one dedicated to the personnel of the aircraft carrier Zuikaku which was sunk in the Battle of Leyte Gulf in 1944.

== Access ==
- A 10-minute walk from the center gate of Kashiharajingu-mae Station on Kintetsu Lines (Minami Osaka Line, Yoshino Line, Kashihara Lines).

== Gallery ==
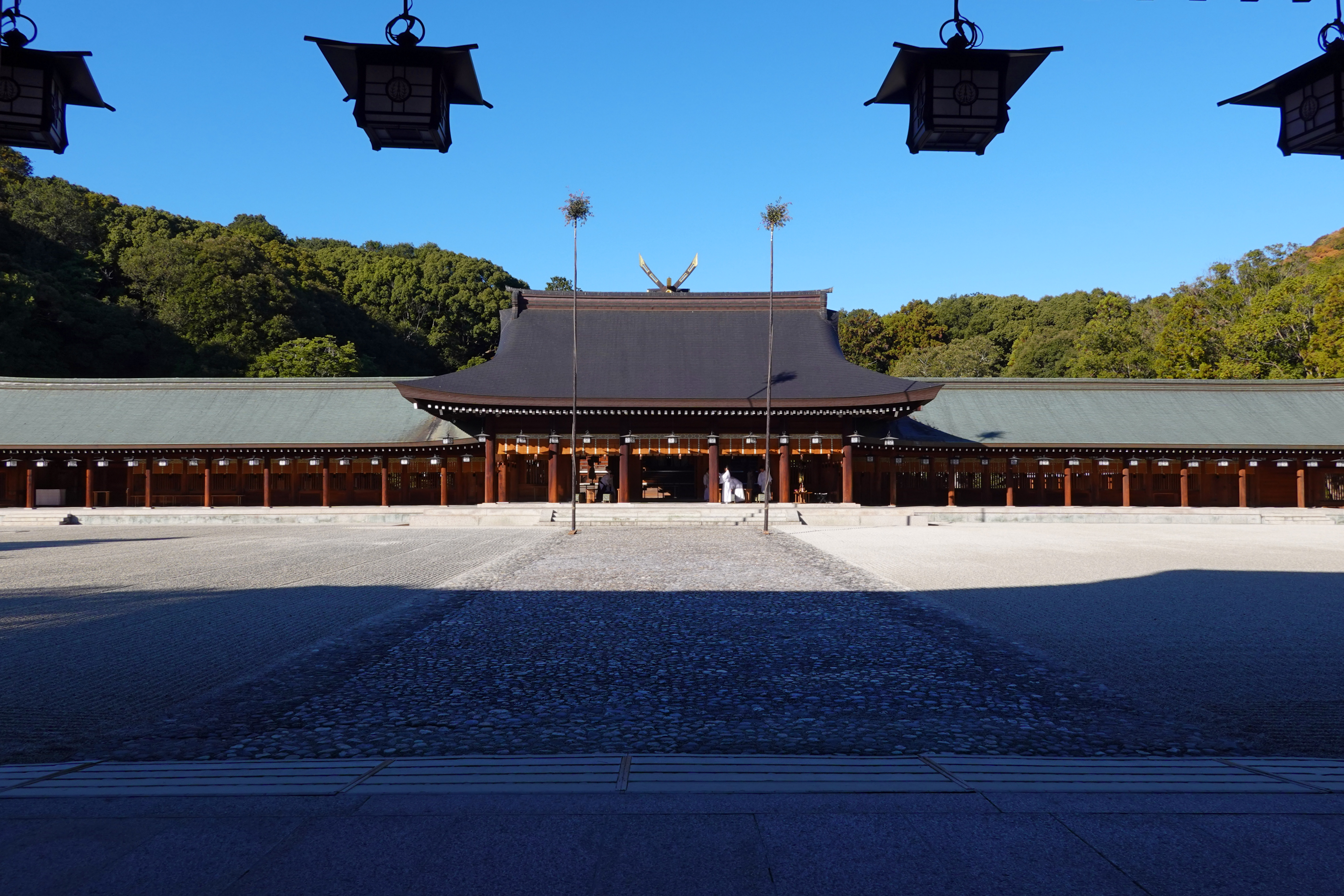
Inner prayer hall, with unusually placed chigi

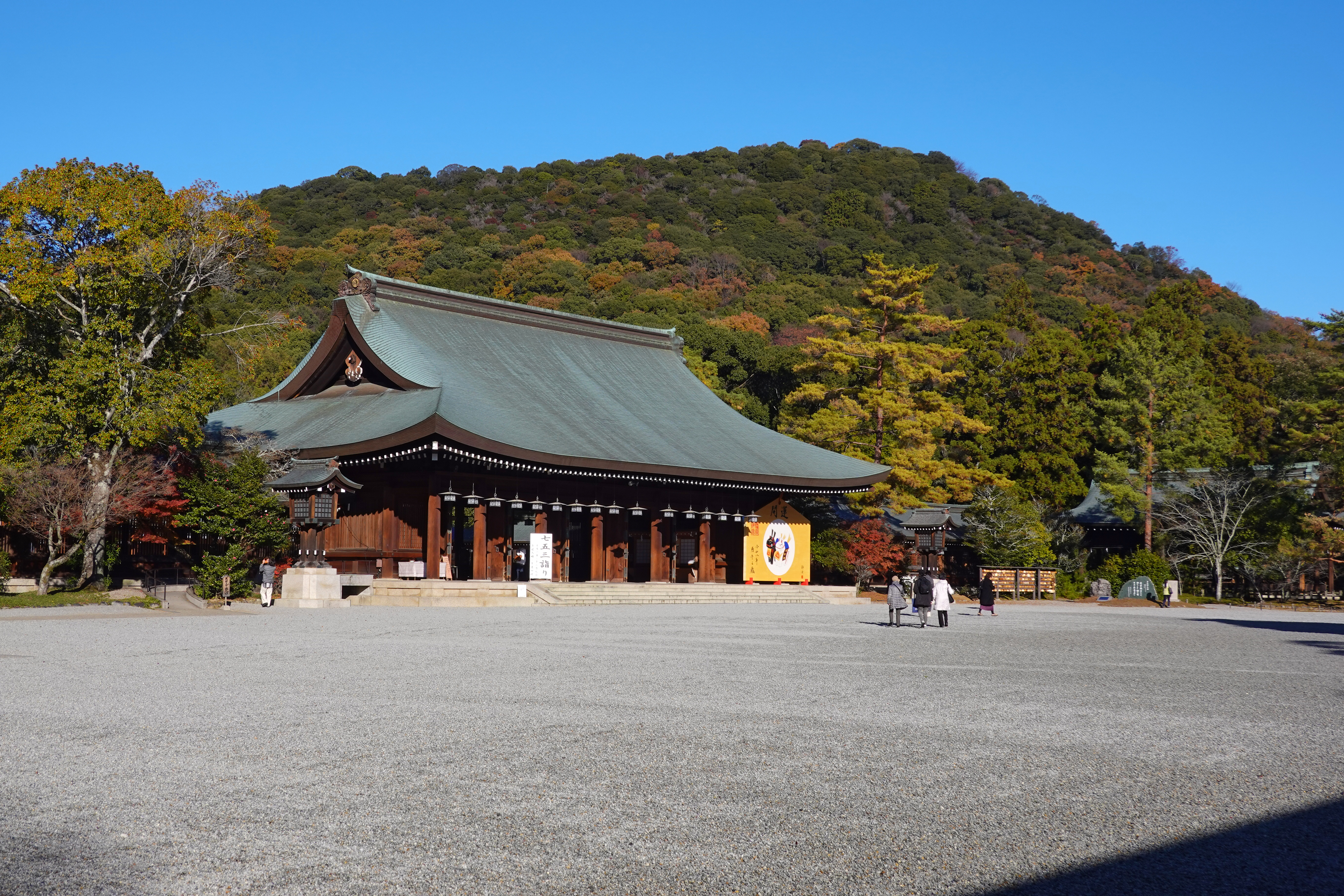
Outer prayer hall

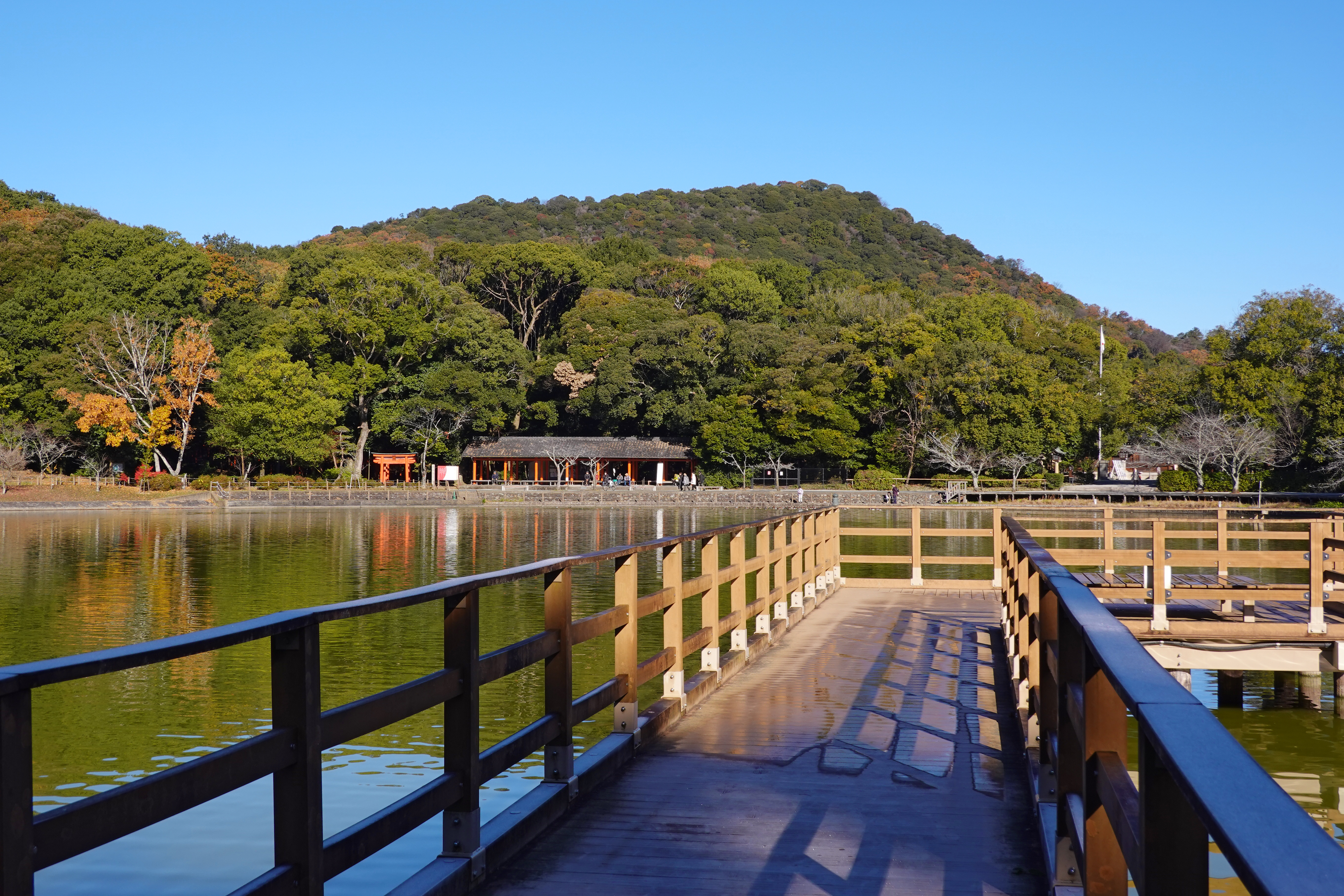
Fukada pond

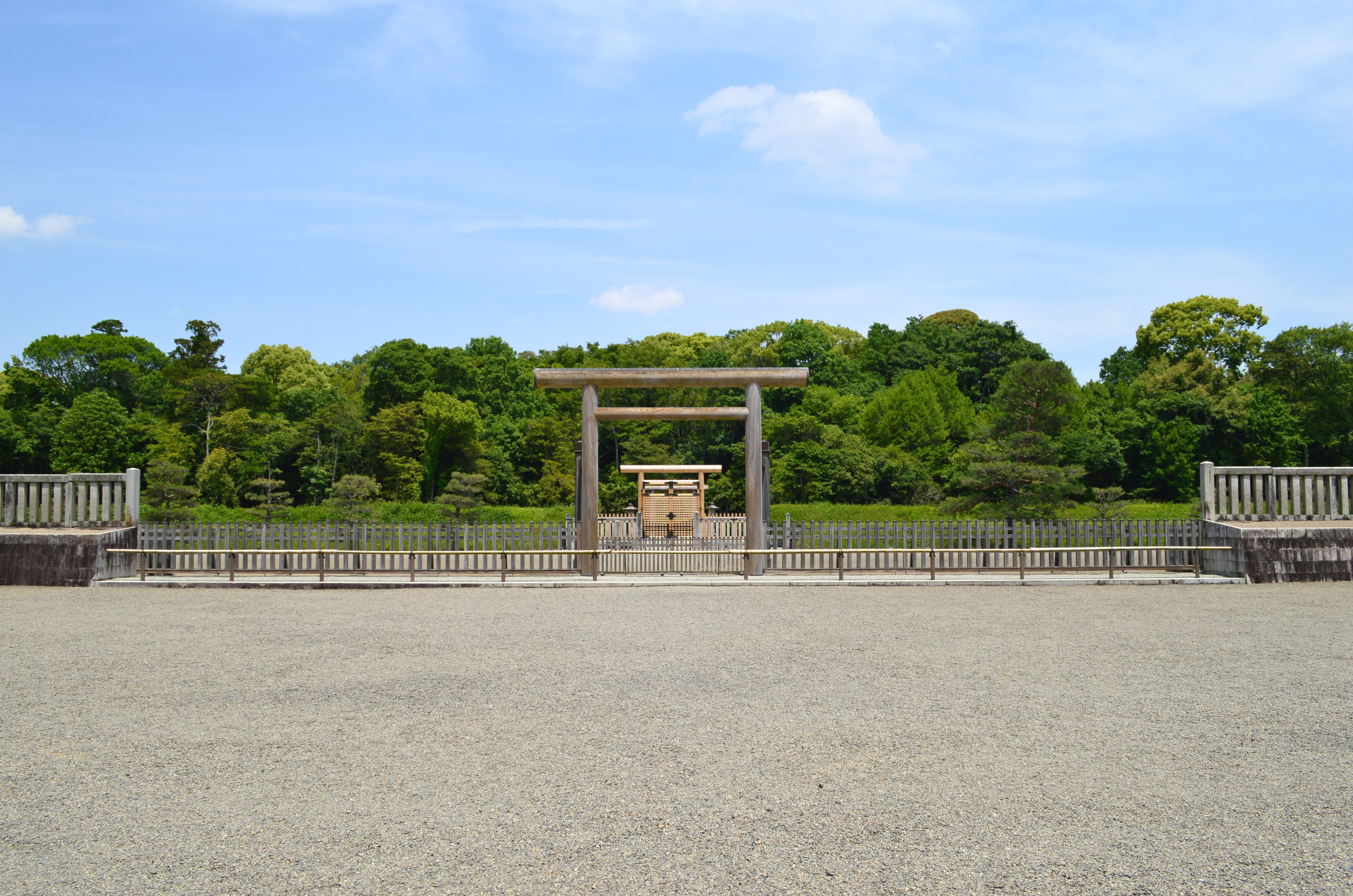
Unebi Goryō, the mausoleum of Jimmu in Kashihara City, Nara Prefecture

== See also ==
- List of Jingū
- The Museum, Archaeological Institute of Kashihara, Nara Prefecture
