= Tenri University Sankōkan Museum =

Museum in Tenri, Nara Prefecture, Japan

- 天理大学附属天理参考館
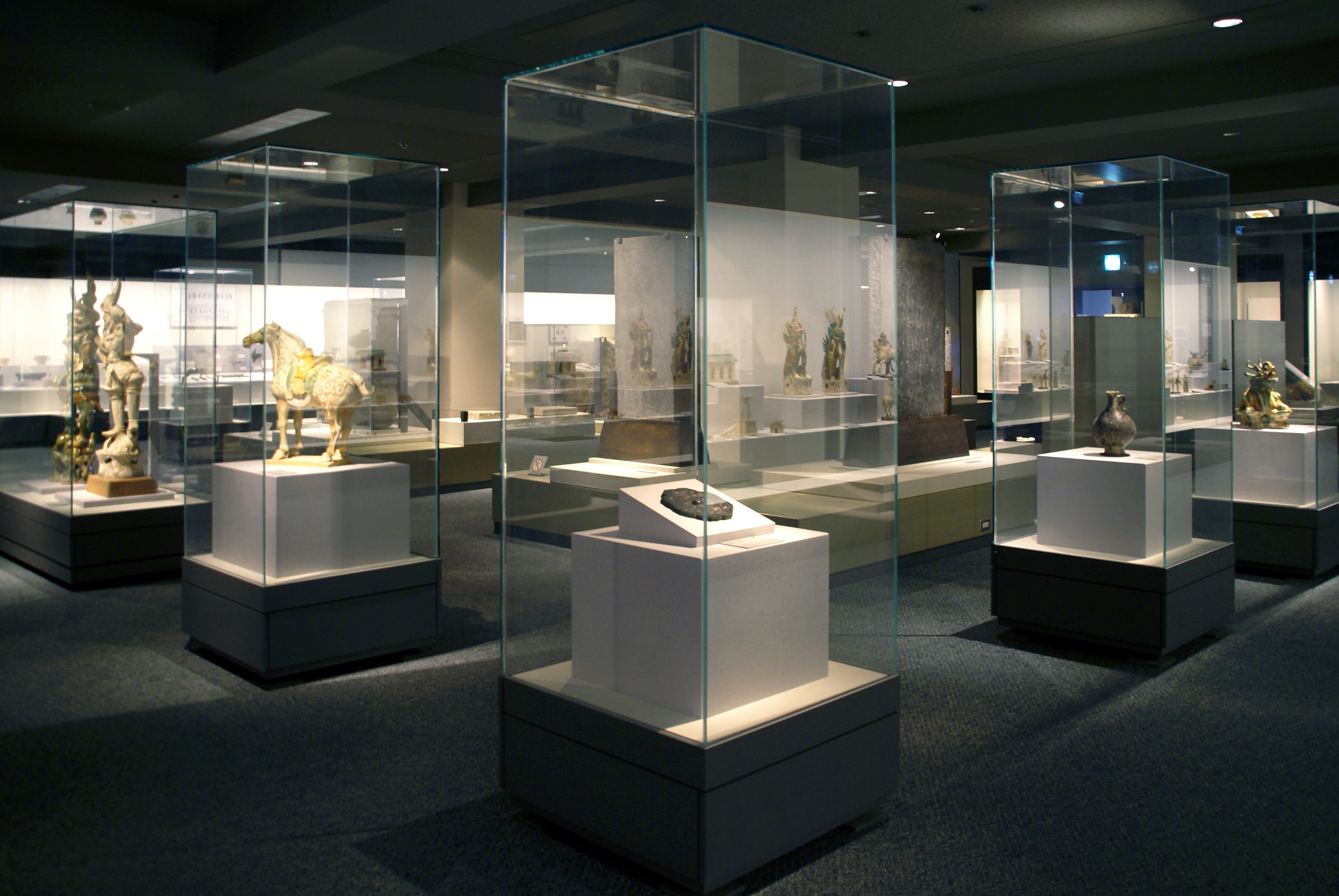

General information
- Location: 250 Morimedo, Tenri, Nara Prefecture, Japan
- Coordinates: 34°35′41″N 135°50′47″E
- Opened: 28 April 1930

Website
- Official website

Tenri University Sankōkan Museum (天理大学附属天理参考館, Tenri Daigaku Fuzoku Tenri Sankōkan) is a museum in Tenri, Nara Prefecture, Japan.

== History ==
The museum first opened in Tenri, Nara Prefecture, Japan, in 1930. Initially called the Overseas Reference Materials Room (海外事情参考品室), it was renamed the Overseas Reference Materials Hall (海外事情参考品館) in 1938, taking its present name in 1950 when it came to be affiliated with Tenri University. The museum reopened in a new building in 2001.

== Collection ==
The museum's collection of over 280,000 objects includes ethnographic and archaeological material from Japan and the rest of the world (including Asia, Oceania, Africa, and Mesoamerica), as well as transport-related artefacts. An offshoot, the Tenri Gallery (天理ギャラリー), opened in the Tokyo Tenri Building (東京天理教館) in Chiyoda, Tokyo in 1962. There are also exhibits on the history of Tenrikyo, including historical overseas missionary activities.
