= Independent Administrative Institution National Museum =

Coordinates: 35°43′12″N 139°46′32″E

Independent Administrative Institution (IAI) National Museum ("National Museum") was the official name of the corporate entity created by the Japanese government in 2001 by merging three formerly independent national museums—the Tokyo National Museum, the Kyoto National Museum, and the Nara National Museum. The assimilated organizational structure was brought about as a part of the national government's administrative reform program; and the clear goal was to provide higher quality and better educational services to the public. In 2005, a fourth institution was added—the Kyushu National Museum. These reforms are designed to bring keiretsu-like synergy and enhanced administrative efficiencies in the work of achieving the range of inter-related preservation, conservation, and education goals of each unique institution.

In 2007, the perceived successes of the IAI National Museum experiment led to a further consolidation. The Independent Administrative Institution National Institutes for Cultural Heritage was established by merging two Independent Administrative Institutions—the National Museum, which comprised the Tokyo National Museum, the Kyoto National Museum, the Nara National Museum and the Kyushu National Museum—and the Independent Administrative Institution National Research Institute for Cultural Properties, which consisted of the National Research Institute for Cultural Properties, Tokyo and the National Research Institute for Cultural Properties, Nara. The rationale for merging these entities flow from a recognition that all share the same purpose of conservation and utilization of cultural properties.

== Overview ==
The combined National Museum was intended to enhance plans to enrich the national collections and improve museum facilities as well as the ability to collect, preserve, display, and study cultural properties, including works of art and archaeological objects.

As a long-term goal, Japan's National Museum aims to enhance its functions as an educational facility and as a platform for international cultural exchanges and the dissemination of Japanese culture. Short term planning focused on improving the efficiencies of operation, enhancing the range of services provided to the public, and consolidating the museums' financial position.

In order to achieve these objectives, the National Museum has identified a number of basic roles it needs to fulfill in order to make itself more appealing to the public and attract more people to the museum:

- To serve as a conduit for "inheriting" Japanese culture—passing down Japanese cultural properties and Japan's invaluable national properties to the following generations in good condition
- To present cultural properties to the public in order to improve and develop Japanese culture
- To promote cultural exchanges between Japan and foreign countries, thus serving as a representative

of Japanese culture

- To contribute to the activities of museums in Japan and abroad, as Japan's central museum

=== Exhibitions ===
The National Museum offers regular exhibitions and provides a variety of special exhibitions to provide people opportunities to face Japanese and Asian works of art and archaeological objects and to appreciate Japanese aesthetics, as well as, develop a better understanding of traditional Japanese culture. The Museum cooperates with museums overseas to organize exhibitions at the National Museum to introduce other cultures to Japanese people; and the Museum is involved in the planning and presentation of exhibitions all around the world that illustrate Japanese aesthetics and culture to people overseas.

=== Research ===
Exhibitions, the preservation of works of art and archaeological objects and other activities carried out by the National Museum are based on the research activities of curators and guest researchers of the museums. Research activities conducted by National Museum curators revitalize the museum's exhibitions. The range of research activities include:

- Research concerning objects owned by each national museum
- Research related to exhibition themes
- Research into the cultural properties held by various regions, and at temples and shrines in local areas
- Research supported by Grant-in-Aid for Scientific Research
- Joint research in and out of Japan
- Research on the environment related to the preservation and exhibition of tangible cultural properties

=== Collection, preservation and restoration ===
The National Museum is involved in continuous efforts to collect tangible cultural properties by purchasing or borrowing them, and accepting donations. An important function of the combined National Museum is to enhance the characteristics of the Tokyo, Kyoto, Nara and Kyushu National Museums and to prevent the dispersion of tangible cultural properties and their leaving our national boundary.

In Japan, the objects which are called "tangible cultural properties" have generally been repaired about once every 100 years. The National Museum carries out two types of repairs -- (a) on an as-needed basis around the time of exhibitions and preservation, and (b) on a periodic basis in response to the progress of deterioration of the art object.

=== Fuller use of museum facilities ===
In order to attract more people to the national museums and awaken an interest in cultural properties, the museum facilities are now being rented for various private-business events. In such cases, viewing some of the museum's works of art is one of the major components of the event. This new approach was adopted after the National Museum complex became an Independent Administrative Institution. Events planned and organized by the National Museum are mainly aiming at facilitating more public exposure of exhibitions and museum facilities.

== Tokyo National Museum ==
The Tokyo National Museum (TNM) is investigating and re-thinking ways in which the museum can be presented and used by the public. Whilst improving the suggested route for visitors and the use of space inside the gallery, and holding programs such as thematic exhibitions or special features, TNM attempts to use the gallery not only as a place of "appreciation", but also the space of "relaxation".

=== Research ===
TNM plans and conducts research, the results of which are reflected in its collection, in its preservation strategies, and in its exhibition planning. In addition to funds allocated in from the national government's annual budget, Grant-in-Aid for Scientific Research and grants for cultural activities from the government are used to carry out TNM's research activities. Examples of TNM-specific research activities are:

- Research on the copies by Kano school in the TNM collection
- Constructing a theory aiming at redevelopment of historic buildings as exhibition spaces for cultural properties
- Comprehensive research on historical documents previously owned by the Edo Shogunate

== Kyoto National Museum ==
The Kyoto National Museum (KNM) houses treasures cultural heritage from shrines and temples in and around Kyoto since it was established. The number of works and historical materials involving Kyoto culture has also been increasing from year to year through purchase and donation. The Kyoto National Museum is also home to the Conservation Center for Cultural Properties, which was set up as a first integrated facility to repair cultural property in Japan in 1980.

=== Research ===
Since 1979, KNM has been systematically carrying out a comprehensive survey of the cultural properties of selected temples and shrines in Kyoto, to gather information to be used to promote museum programs. In 2005, TNM focused attention and research on the cultural properties of the Kennin-ji temple and its sub-temples. The results of such research on temples and shrines are published in the series "Research Reports on Temples and Shrines" (24+ volumes).

== Nara National Museum ==
Since its opening in 1895, the Nara National Museum (NNM) has been involved in collecting and preserving cultural properties, especially Buddhist arts in cooperation with the shrines and temples of greater Nara. NNM projects plans for enhancing its routine activities and its on-going focus on preservation of cultural properties. Greater attention is being devoted to possibilities which may arise from computerization.

=== Research ===
The results of research by NNM concerning cultural properties are reflected in regular and special exhibitions. Research enlivens the contents of those exhibitions; and examples of NNM-specific research activities are:

- Systemic research on shrines and temples in Nara
- Research on Asian art overseas
- Research on objects unearthed from ancient temples in Nara (joint research with the university-directed archaeological programs)
- Research on Buddhist paintings (joint research with the Tokyo National Research Institute for Cultural Properties)
- Collection of and research on photographs of Buddhist art
- Academic exchanges with such institutions as the National Museum of Korea and the National Museum of China

== Kyushu National Museum ==
The Kyushu National Museum is still in the process of developing its own unique character; but the preliminary foundation of its development begins with the idea that the formation of Japanese culture should be considered within the context of Asian history.

=== Research ===
Decorated Tomb Data Base
As the sophistication of advanced digitization technologies progresses, KNM has been posting a "Decorated Tomb Data Base" online, thus allowing the public to view precision images of burial sites which were extensive in the 5th-6th centuries throughout northern and middle Kyushu. This is an evolving project.

Museum Science
The temperature, humidity and air quality which may affect cultural properties are continuously determined and analyzed to maintain the optimal environments for display and restoration. KNM is focusing on instrumental research such as X-ray photography which can help curators better appreciate and comprehend the various states of a variety of objects. This research can be reflected in KNM's restoration and preservation strategies.

== See also ==
- Independent Administrative Institution (IAI), 2001
- List of Independent Administrative Institutions (Japan)
