= Shōryaku-ji =

Coordinates: 34°38′41″N 135°52′07″E

- 正暦寺
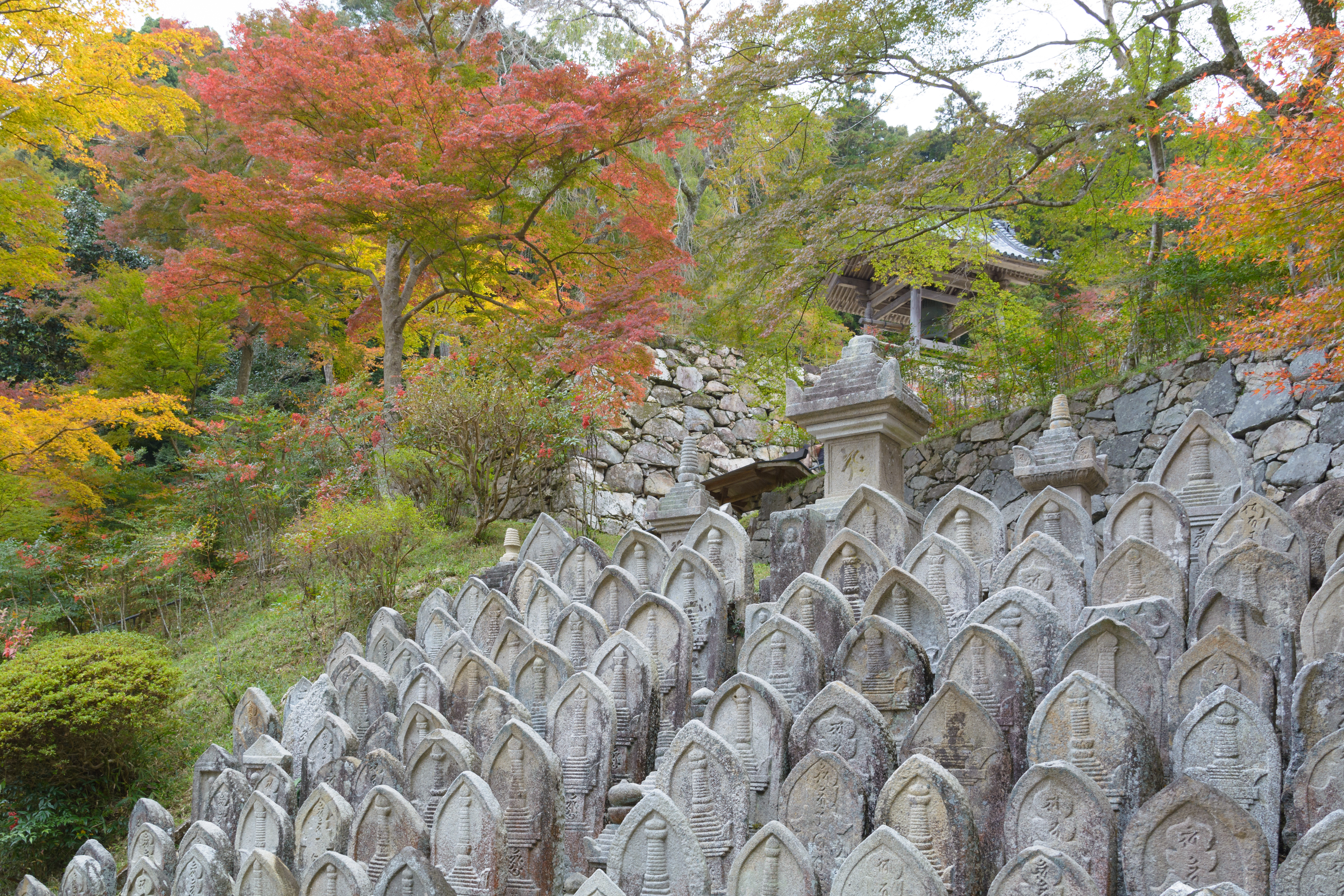

Religion
- Affiliation: Bodaisen Shingon
- Deity: Yakushi Nyorai

Location
- Location: 157 Bodaisen-chō, Nara, Nara Prefecture
- Country: Japan
- Interactive map of Shōryaku-ji

Architecture
- Founder: Kenshun
- Completed: 992

Website
- http://shoryakuji.jp/index.html

Shōryaku-ji (正暦寺) is a Shingon temple in the southeast of Nara, Japan. Founded in 992, it is the head temple of the Bodaisen Shingon sect. The temple is considered the birthplace of modern methods of refined sake production.

== History ==
Shōryaku-ji is said to have been founded by Kenshun (兼俊), son of Fujiwara no Kaneie, in 992, at the behest of Emperor Ichijō. The temple burned to the ground in the 1180 assault on Nara by Taira no Shigehira. Revived the following century, Shōryaku-ji fell into decline in the Edo period and most of the buildings of the garan have been lost.

== Buildings ==
The Hondō and Shōrō are from the Taishō period (1916 and 1925 respectively). The sukiya-style reception hall from Enpō 9 (1681) is an Important Cultural Property.

== Treasures ==
The honzon, a gilt bronze Yakushi Nyorai of the Asuka period, is a hibutsu. It has been designated an Important Cultural Property, alongside a Southern Song celadon bowl excavated from the precinct, and scroll thirty from a Nara-period Ekottara Agama, known as Zenkō-shuin-kyō (善光朱印経) or sutras with the red seal of Zenkō, now kept at Nara National Museum. A Kamakura-period Nirvana painting and a pair of scrolls with an Ise Mandala of the Nanboku-chō period are Prefectural Cultural Properties, as are two standing wooden Heian-period bodhisattvas traditionally identified as having come originally from Daigorin-ji (大御輪寺), and a Kamakura-period sculpture of Kujaku Myōō. A Kamakura-period scroll of Yakushi and the Twelve Heavenly Generals is a Municipal Cultural Property and is kept at Nara National Museum.

== Flora ==
The temple's Japanese Chinquapin forest is a Prefectural Natural Monument.
