= Fujinoki Tomb =

6th–7th century tumulus in Nara, Japan

Fujinoki Kofun
- Fujinoki-kofun Ikaruga Nara Pref02s3s4410.jpg
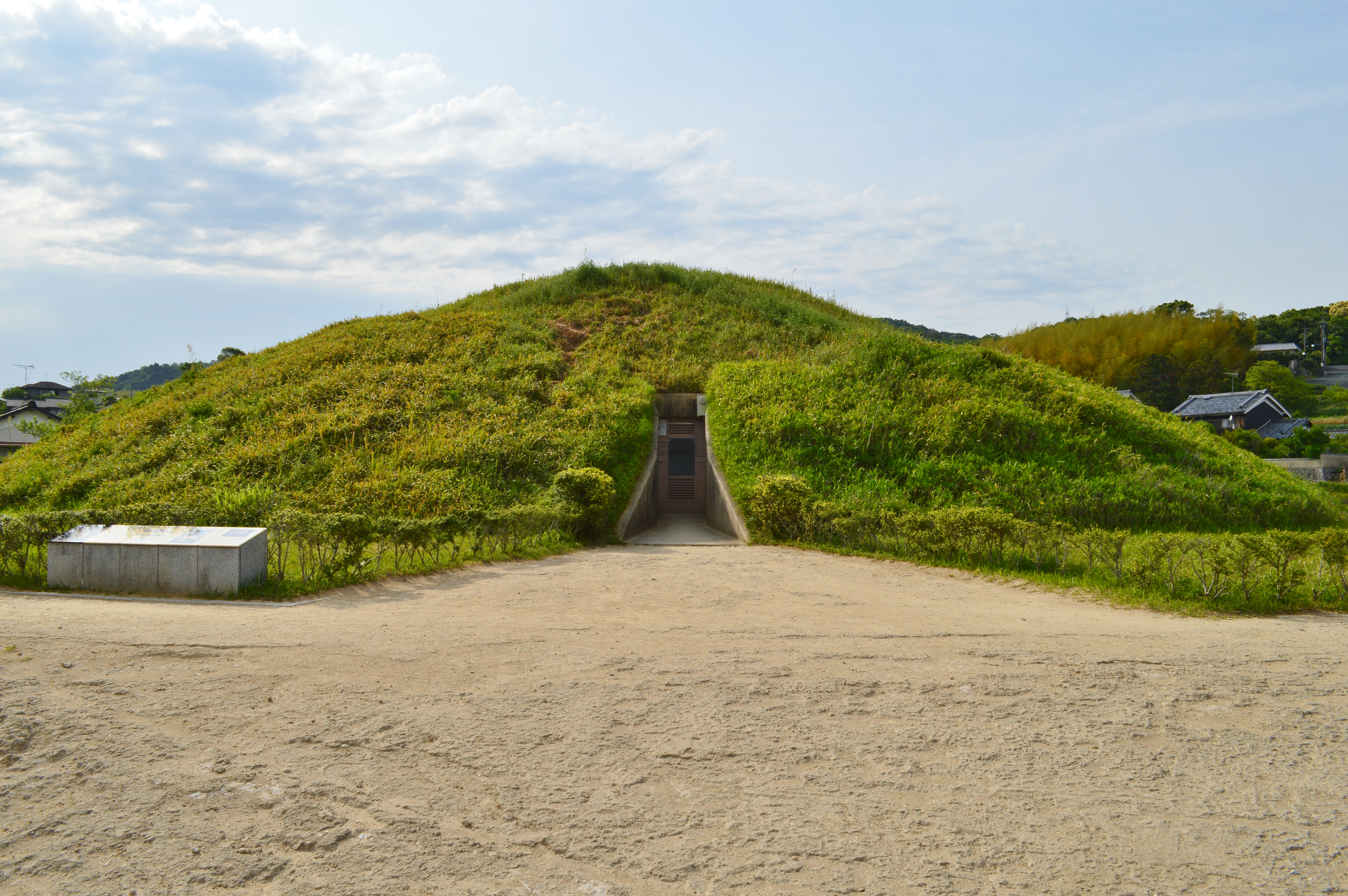
- Fujinoki Kofun

- Fujinoki Kofun Fujinoki Tomb (Japan)
- 34°36′42.5″N 135°43′46.0″E
- Type: Kofun
- Periods: Asuka period
- Location: Ikaruga, Nara, Japan
- Region: Kansai region

History
- Built: c.6th century

Site notes
- Public access: Yes (museum)
- National Treasure National Historic Site of Japan

The Fujinoki Kofun (藤ノ木古墳) is an Asuka period burial mound, located in the town of Ikaruga, Nara in the Kansai region of Japan. The tumulus was designated a National Historic Site of Japan in 1991. It gained widespread media attention for its wealth of grave goods, which were collectively designated a National Important Cultural Property and later designated as a National Treasure It is estimated to date from the later half of the sixth century or the late seventh century.

== Overview ==
The Fujinoki Kofun is located about 350 meters west of the Western Precinct of Hōryū-ji, and according to ancient documents and records related to that temple was called "Misasaki" or "Misasagiyama". It is a circular enpun (円墳)-style tumulus with an original diameter of approximately 50 meters and a height of about 9 meters. However, it has been gradually eroded by the surrounding paddy fields and buildings, and is now about 7.6 meters high and 40 meters in maximum diameter. It was thought that the installation of haniwa in Yamato ended in the first half of the 6th century, but cylindrical haniwa were lined up at the foot of the mound, correcting the previous view. Archaeological excavation began in 1985 and were conducted in six stages between 1985 and 2006.

The horizontal-entry stone burial chamber had not been looted, and contained the remains of two adult men who were buried together in a house-shaped stone sarcophagus. The burial chamber was just under 14 meters in total length, with a length of about 6.0 meters on the west wall side and about 5.7 meters on the east wall side, a width of about 2.4–2.7 meters, and a height of about 4.2–4.4 meters. The length of the passage is about 8.3 meters, and the width of the passage is about 1.8–2.1 meters. The floor of the burial chamber is covered with gravel, and a drainage ditch was laid underneath it from the center through the passage to the base of the mound. The stone sarcophagus was placed at the back of the burial chamber. The stone material is white tuff from Mount Nijō, and the inside and outside of the sarcophagus were painted with red pigment (mercury vermilion). The size of the sarcophagus is about 235 × 130 × 97 cm, and the lid is about 230 × 130 cm, about 52–55 cm thick, and has a rope hanging protrusions. The sarcophagus is slightly larger in both width and height on the east side than on the west side, and the plan is trapezoidal.

It is not known exactly how Fujinoki Kofun managed to stay relatively untouched, as monks are unlikely to have served as responsible guardians over the years. However, there is still evidence that some theft occurred, as the sarcophagus is chipped on one corner, indicating that thieves had entered and attempted to pry off its lid. There are also a number of extra, unmatched lids amongst the pottery, and the pottery that is present is all moved to one side of the room. It is likely that any thieves were caught in the act, as many of the remaining goods are wrapped in cloth and placed where they would not be easily seen. While some of the contents of the tomb have been pilfered, the tomb has managed to stay mostly undisturbed. Based on the age of the large amount of Haji ware and Sue ware potter excavated from the burial chamber, it is estimated that the tumulus was constructed in the late Kofun period, the fourth quarter of the 6th century. During this period, the construction of keyhole-shaped tombs in the Kinai region was nearing completion.

The grave goods include gilt bronze horse equipment, accessories, iron swords, and ornaments such as a gilt bronze crown and gilt bronze sandals, four bronze mirrors, and more than 10,000 glass beads were found in the coffin. The swords were luxuriously decorated with gilt bronze. The two bodies were wrapped in four layers of cloth over their clothes, and silk cloth was laid on the bottom of the coffin. Because it is a circular tomb, The Fujinoki Kofun is not a grave of imperial rank, but since there were many grave goods made of precious metals, it is assumed that the person for whom the tomb was constructed was a person of great power. The tomb's appearance is supplemented by the horse harness excavated in the tomb which is a Chinese product imported via the Korean Peninsula. Michio Maezono (Professor, Nara College of Arts) and Taichiro Shiraishi (Professor, Nara University) argue that it is highly possible Prince Anahobe (uncle of Prince Shōtoku, assassinated by Soga no Umako) and Prince Yakabe (prince of Emperor Senka) are the ones that were buried in this tumulus, because the tumulus was built when an assassination happened in June 587 according to "Nihon Shoki". Additionally, Iō Yūsuke stated that the native Japanese people of the day did not know the "meaning of the ornamental patterns carved on saddle fittings" nor "how to make such fittings". On the other hand, Yamamoto Tadanao of Tenri University claims that some masks and sculptures exhibit the Northern Wei Chinese style.

Regarding the buried person on the south side, where the bones are poorly preserved and the pelvis is missing, osteoarchaeologist Kazumichi Katayama (Professor Emeritus, Kyoto University), who was in charge of the investigation of the inside of the sarcophagus using an endoscope and the examination and analysis of the excavated human bones from 1988 to 1990, stipulated, based on the few remaining "talus" (ankle bone) and "calcaneus" (heel bone), there was a very high probability that one of the buried was male, and that the one on the south side was also male. Archaeologist Yoshiko Mabe (Professor Emeritus, Kobe Women's University) has expressed doubts that, given the size of the burial mound and the fact that they were buried together, the simultaneous burial of two men was highly unusual. In 2009, Tamaki Kazue (lecturer at Nara College of Art and Design), an archaeologist and researcher of jewels from the Kofun period, proposed the theory that the Fujinoki Kofun was a joint burial of men and women, citing the wrist and foot ornaments, the decoration of the human-shaped haniwa clay figurines, and descriptions in the Kojiki and Nihon Shoki as clues, claiming that the hand and foot ornaments were "female ornaments." The subject continues to remain an issue of academic speculation.

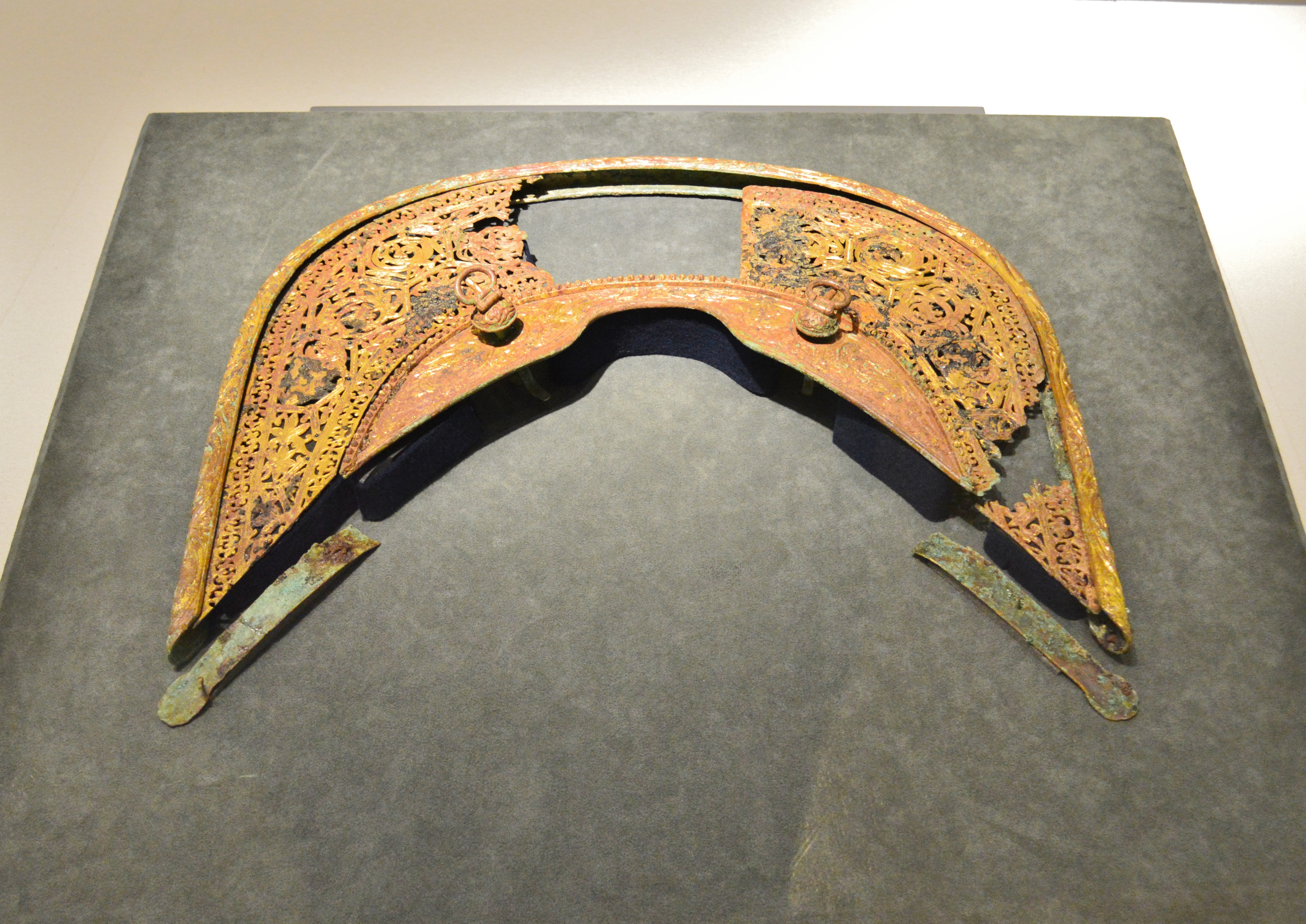
Gilded bronze saddle fitting front wheel (maewa)
Nara Prefectural Kashihara Archaeological Institute (other images are the same).

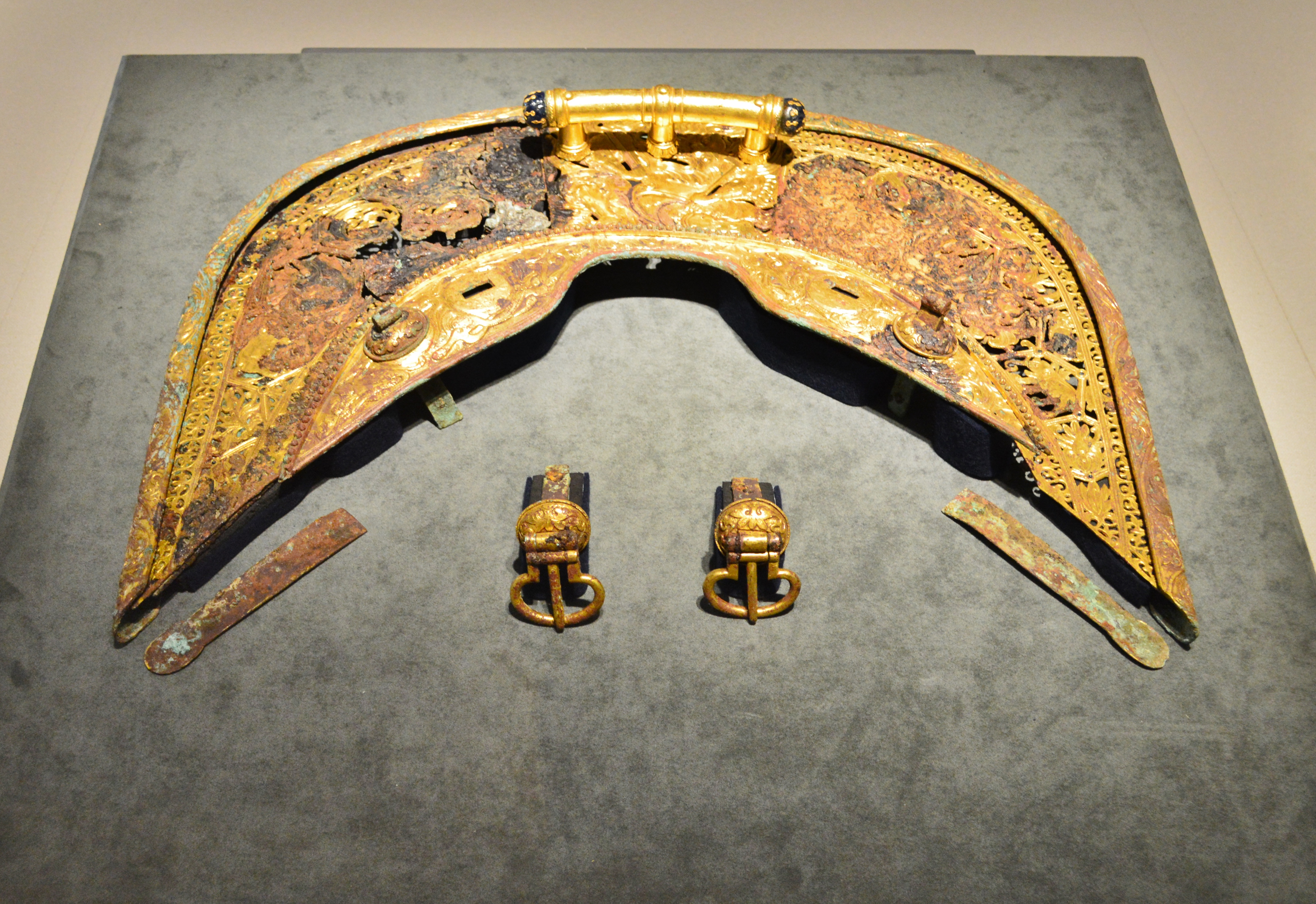
Gilded bronze saddle fitting, rear wheel (shizuwa)

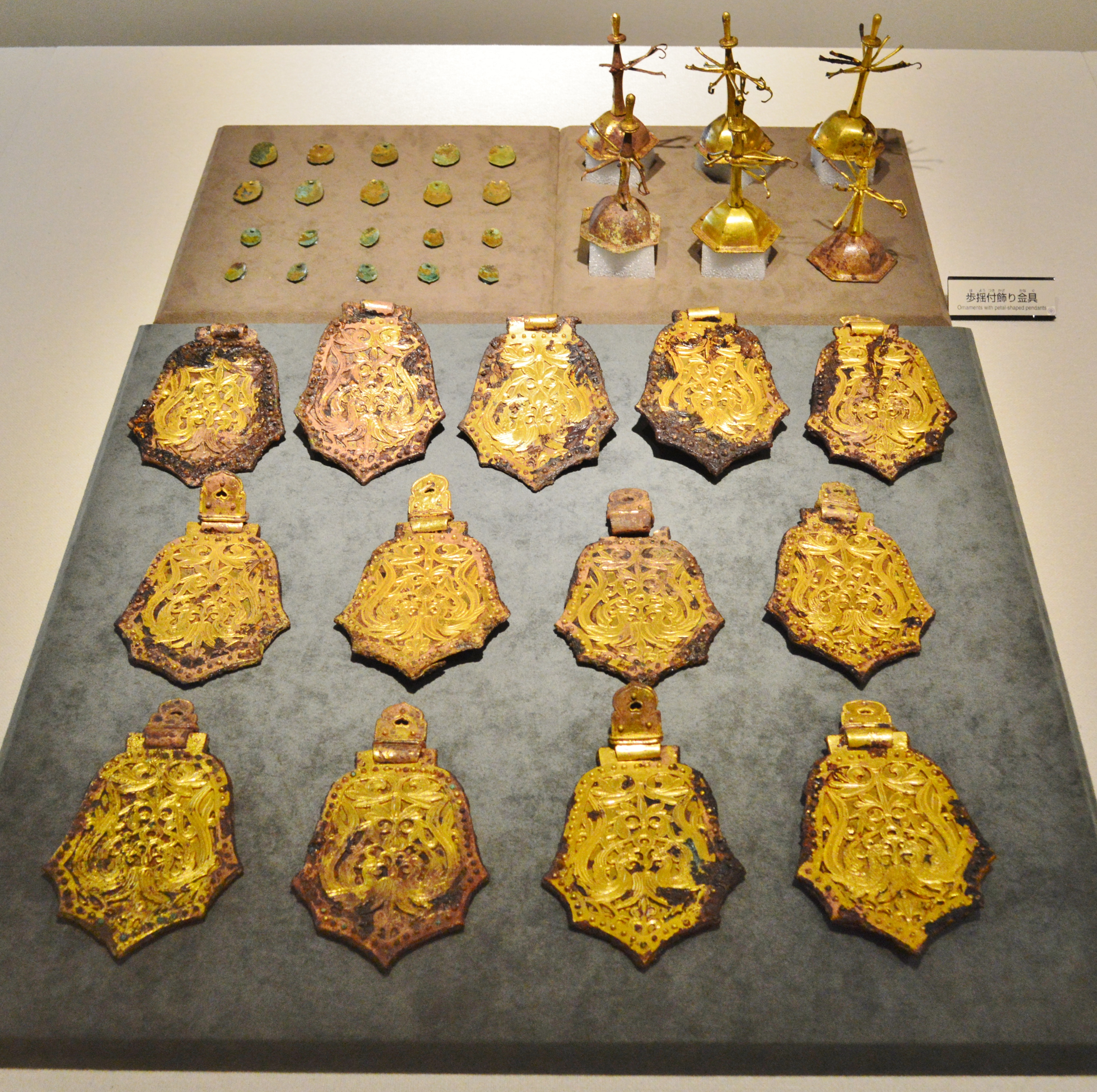
Thorn-shaped apricot leaf / Walking ornament

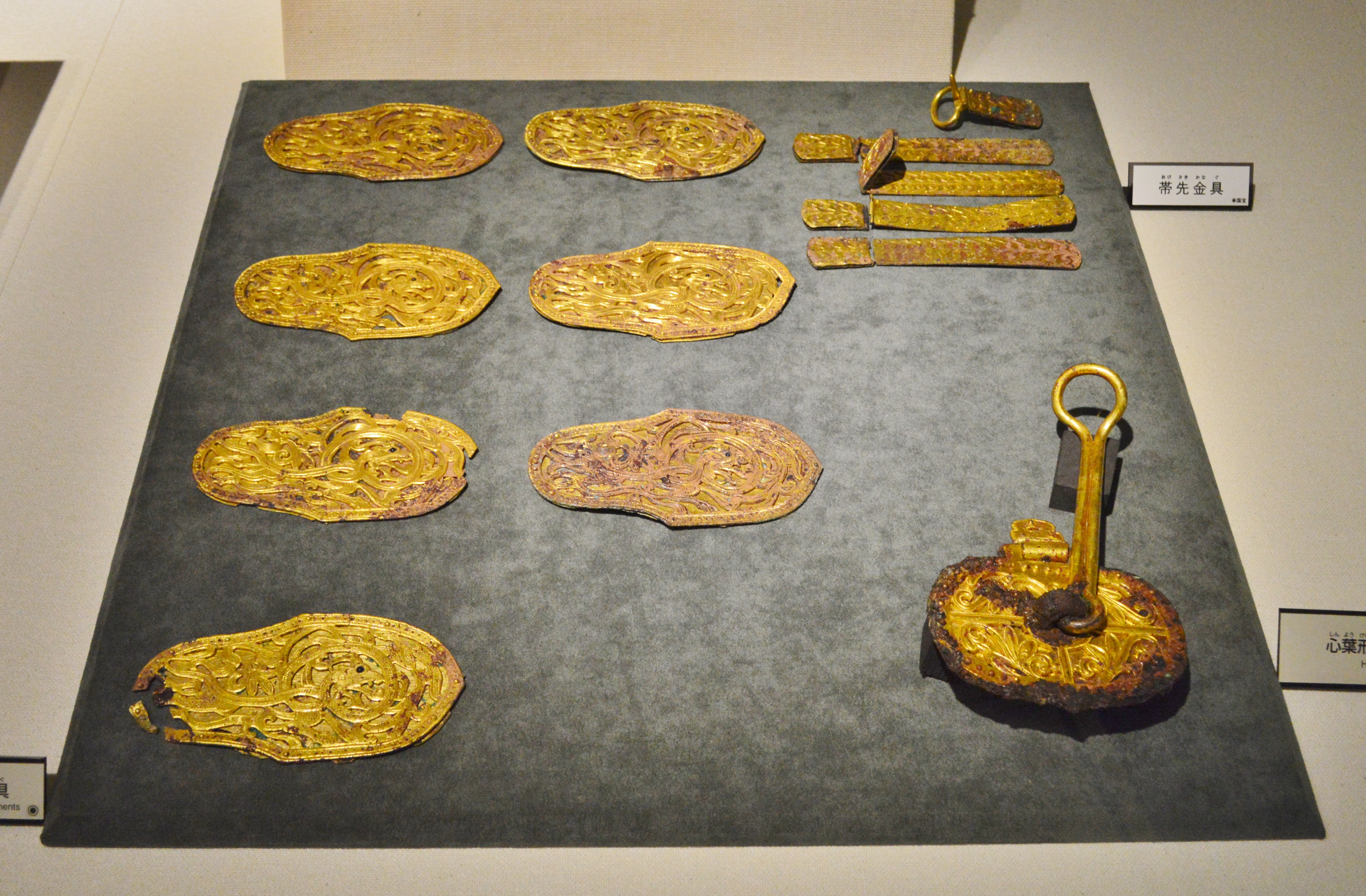
Dragon pattern ornament, heart leaf-shaped mirror plate bit, obi end fitting, excavated from Fujinoki Tomb

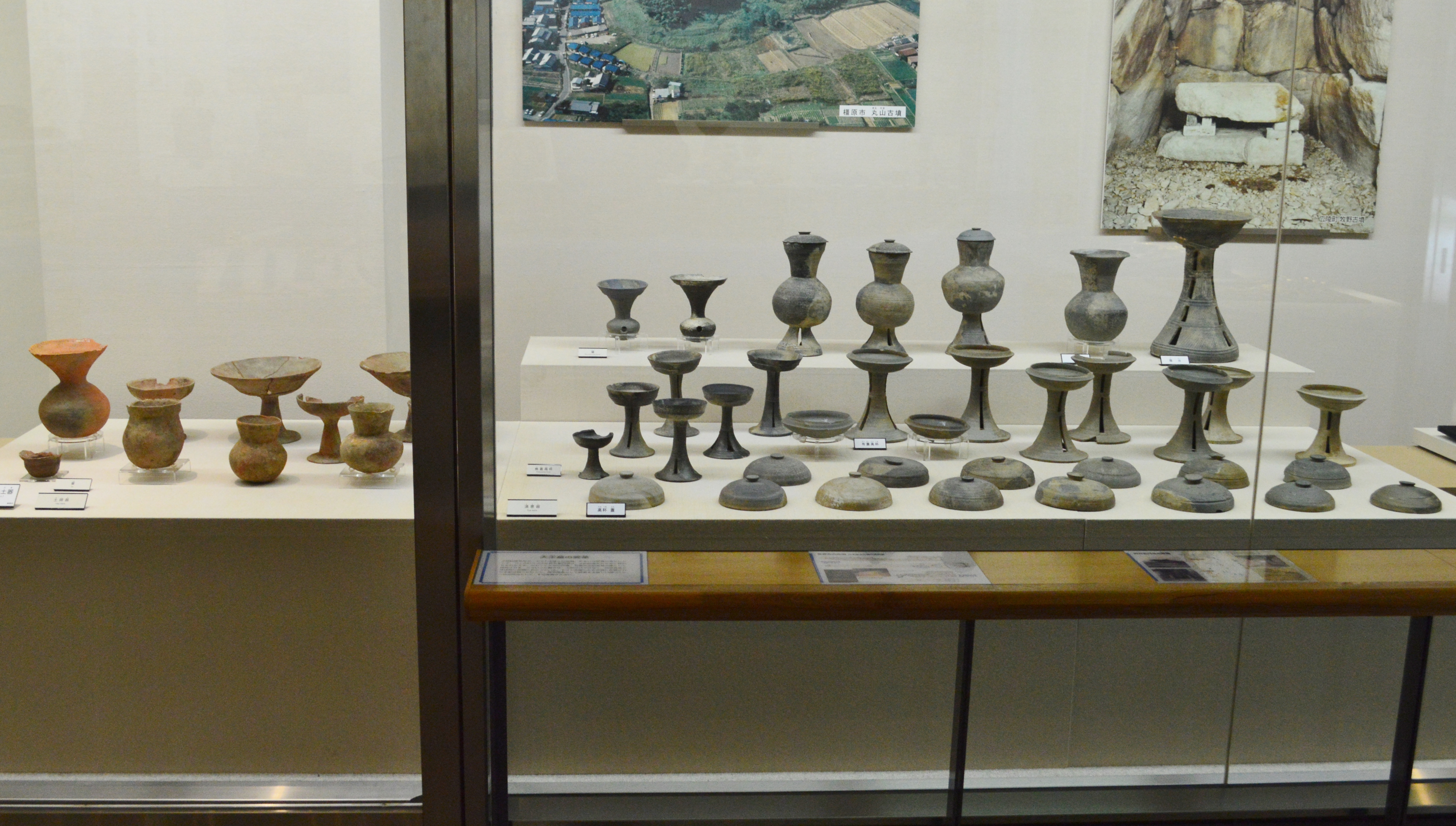
Pottery

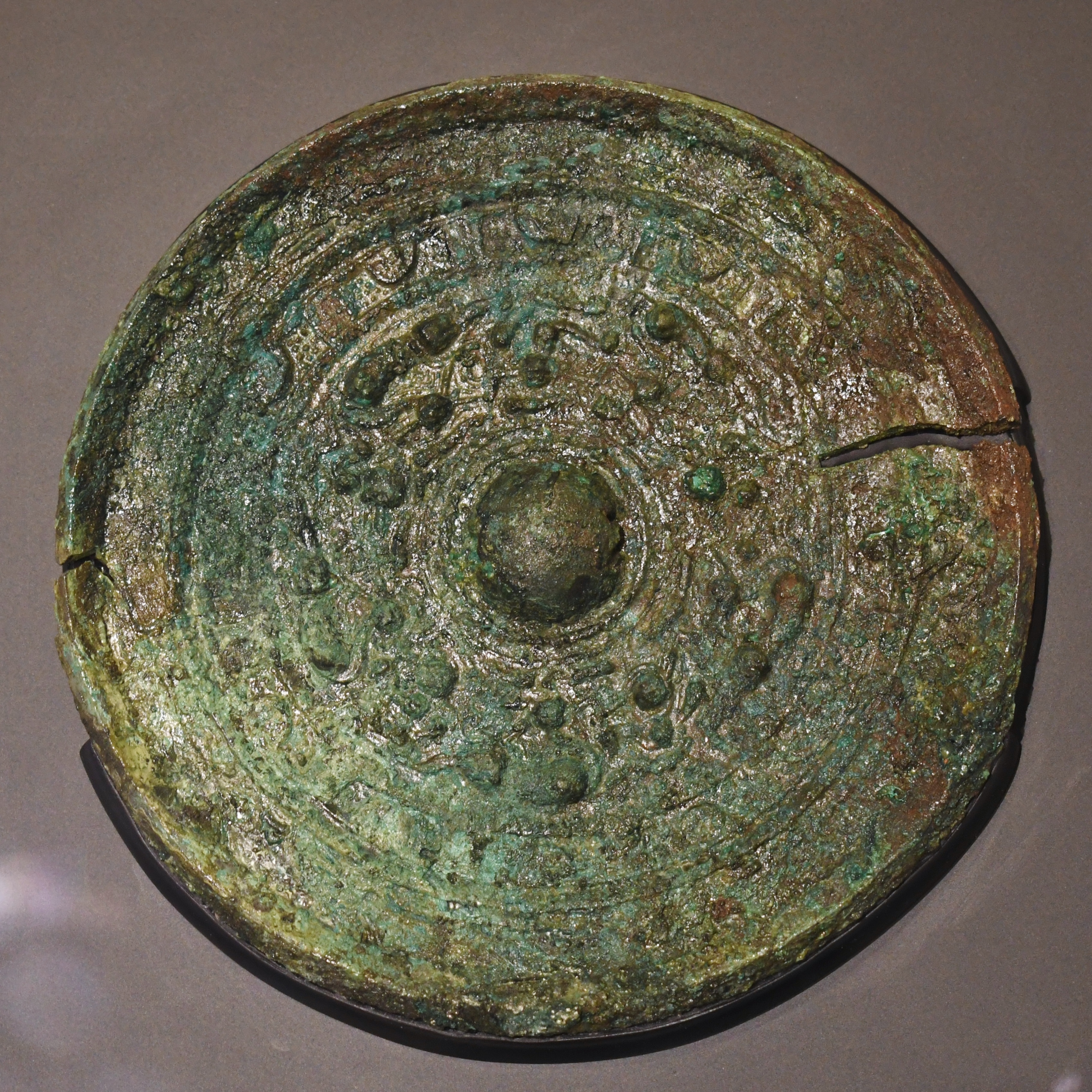
Divine beast mirror

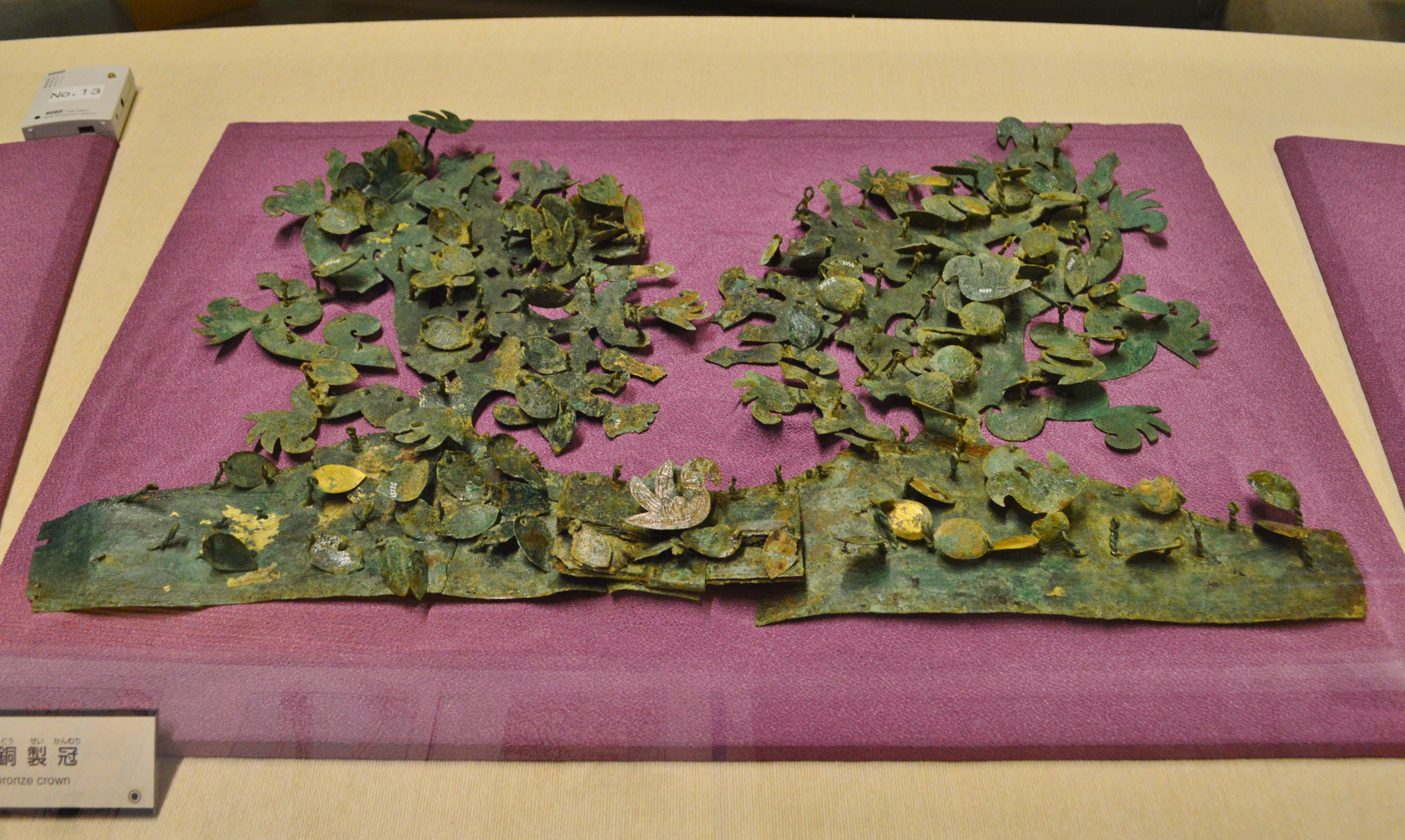
Gilded bronze crown

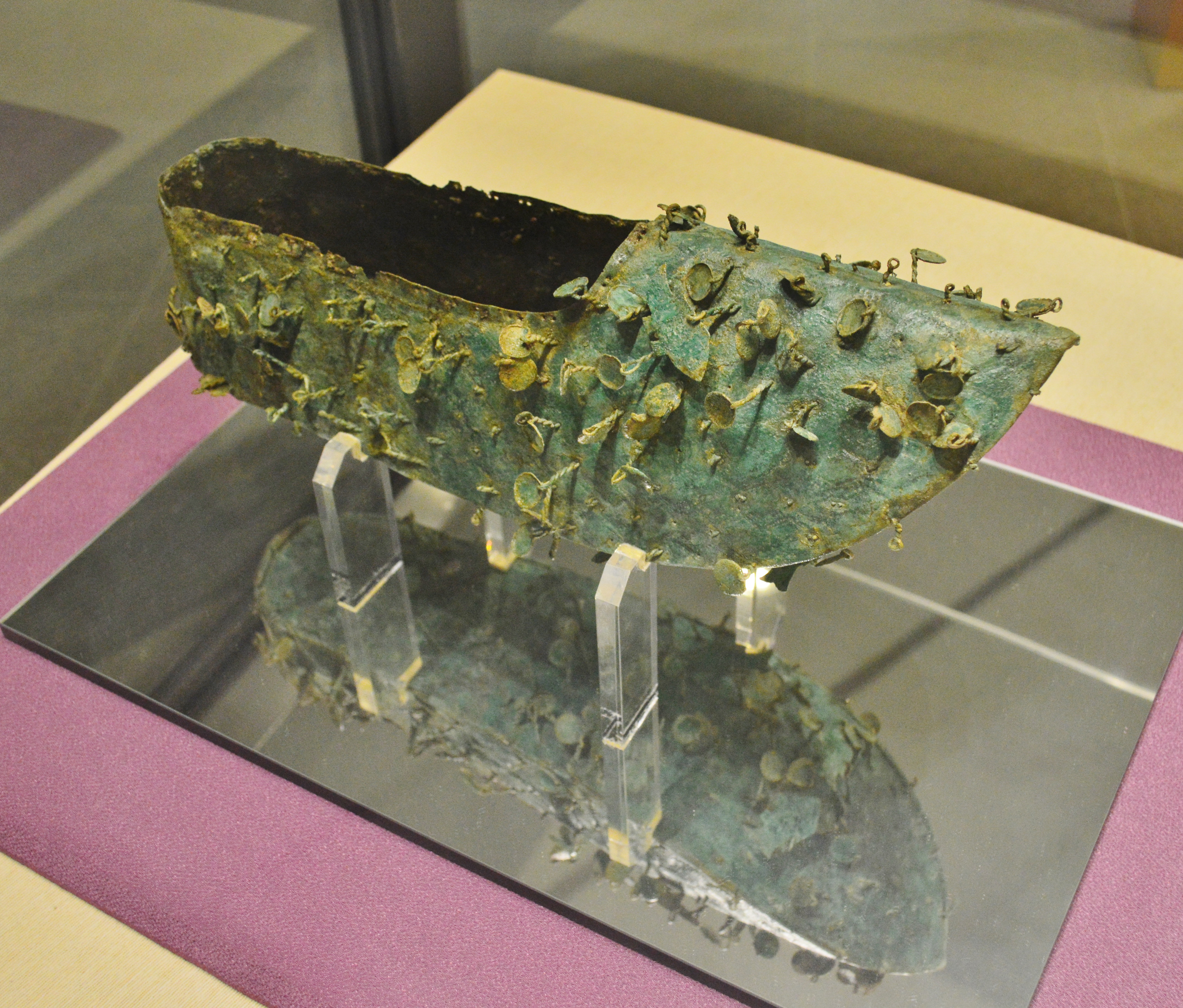
Gilded bronze footwear

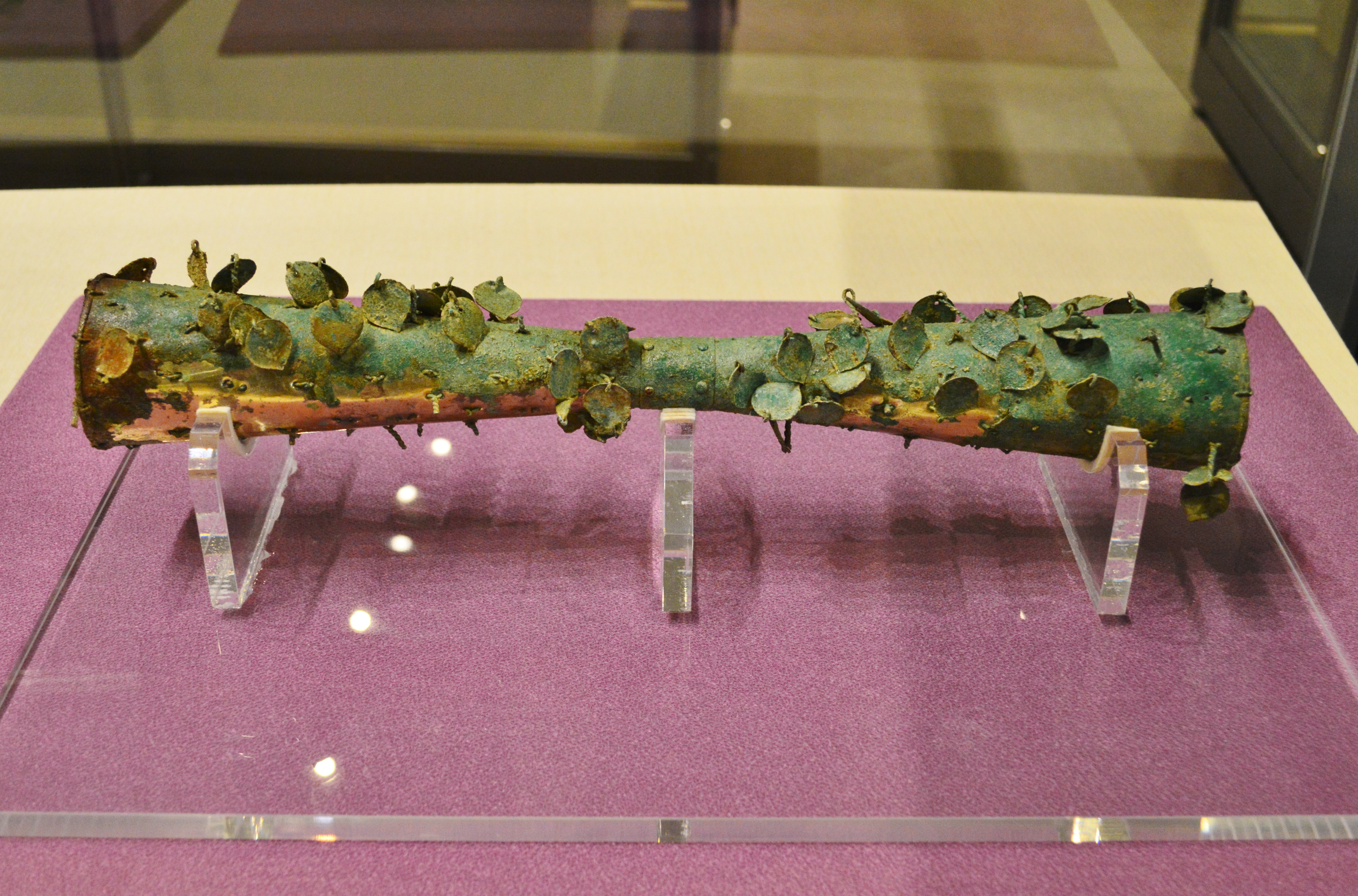
Gilded bronze cylindrical item

== Horse-trappings ==
Although there are many theories that speculate when horse-riding began in Japan, there appears to be very little evidence that indicates horses were ridden before the fifth century. Instead, the best piece of evidence that provides proof of actual riding are wooden stirrups that appear in the earlier portion of the fifth century. The grand category of items that are considered "horse-trappings" consists of wooden items (stirrups, saddles with gilt-bronze parts, and cheek plates) and iron (armor for horses, armor for riders, and weapons for the riders as well). Similar to the Otani Kofun in Wakayama, the Fujinoki Kofun had a remarkable amount of horse-trappings, more horse-trappings than any other known kofun. There also appear to be multiple “sets” of trappings in Fujinoki. A set consists of pieces such as saddle parts, stirrups, and bits. Half of the pieces have missing counterparts. The bits that are found in the Fujinoki tomb differ from what was typically found in Japan, a mouthpiece consisting of two linked sections instead of a single rod. No such bits have been found in Fujinoki and it has been suggested that the bits were instead made of rawhide rope, since metal was rare and costly in various parts of Asia. The gilt bronze saddle fittings use motifs such as palmettes, phoenixes, dragons, demon masks, monstrous fish, elephants, lions, and rabbits. Saddle fittings with similar motifs have been excavated near Chaoyang, Liaoning Province, China, where the capital of the Xianbei state of Northern Yan was located, but no other similar saddles have been excavated in Japan, Silla, Baekje, or Gaya, making them extremely rare.

=== "Giant" trappings ===
Late in the evolution of riding gear, giant trappings make an appearance mainly as status symbols. Giant trappings were merely show pieces and there was almost no possibility that they were worn, as these giant trappings would not have paired nicely at the time with the small physical size of horses that would have been ridden in Japan. Among the giant trappings found in Fujinoki, the characteristics of the stirrups recovered resembled that of a sixth-century style. Unlike the stirrups in other sites, the example discovered in Fujinoki was decently-preserved and the features were actually recognizable. This example consisted of three slightly curved bars that joined at the top to complete a bronze frame that was floored by a foot piece made of wood. Additionally, an attachment was made by a linked chain connecting to a strap that crossed the back of the saddle. Unfortunately, the stirrup found in Fujinoki is broken and multiple, large parts are missing that would have composed the remains of the reinforcing frame. The giant trappings were merely show pieces and the extent of their use may have been solely as burial goods.

=== Saddle Bows ===
Also found in Fujinoki was the remnants of a saddle, which were not often found in their entirety in other tombs. This saddle was adorned with gilt-bronze, arc-shaped ornaments that were attached to the wooden cantles. The saddle mainly consisted of two bows, in the front and the rear, which would have had straps that looped under the accompanying part of the horse for stability. These bows had a section dedicated to decoration that was reinforced by a thick, heavy outer frame and a thick, lower arc for buckles. Only the rear bow had a special middle piece that was completely missing from the front bow. The rear bow appeared to be less extravagant and lacked decoration, indicating this was an afterthought, while the front bow's ornamentation was full and complete.

== Current situation ==
Currently, the surrounding area has been developed into a park, and many information boards have been installed, making it a tourist spot around Hōryū-ji. In addition, about 200 meters south of the tomb, there is a historical site information facility (Ikaruga Cultural Properties Center), where replicas of the main excavated items are on display. The Nara Prefectural Kashihara Archaeological Institute has restored the excavated horse equipment using a 3D printer, and some of it is available for the public to touch.

== See also ==
- List of Historic Sites of Japan (Nara)
- Kitora Tomb
- Takamatsuzuka Tomb
