= Chikurin-ji =

Buddhist temple in Nara Prefecture, Japan

- 竹林寺
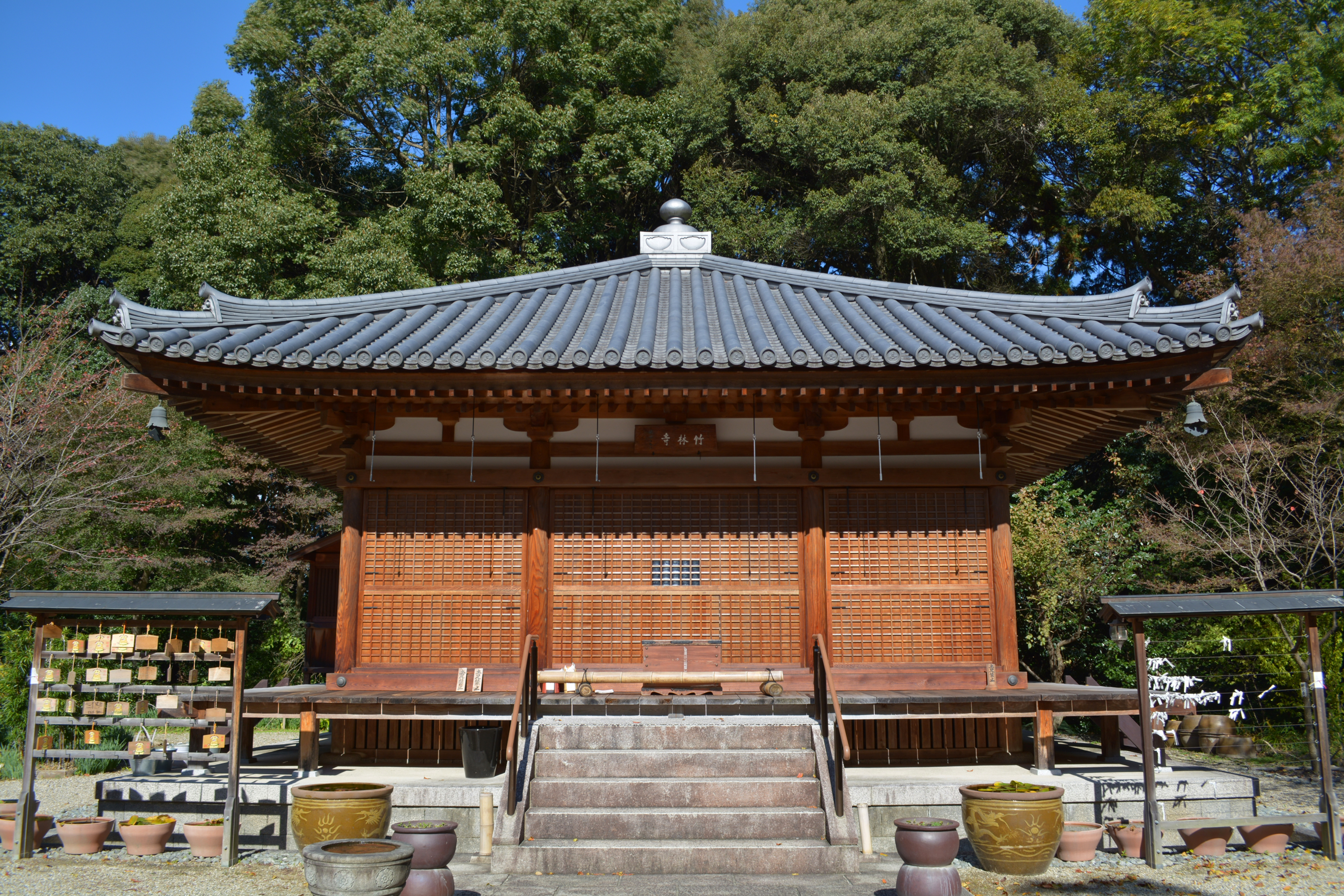
- Chikurin-ji Hondo

- Location within Nara Prefecture Location within Japan

Religion
- Affiliation: Buddhist
- Deity: Monju Bosatsu
- Rite: Ritsu
- Status: functional

Location
- Location: 211-1 Arisatocho, Ikoma-shi, Nara-ken 630-0233
- Country: Japan
- Coordinates: 34°40′21.8″N 135°42′12.4″E

Architecture
- Founder: c.Gyōki
- Completed: c.673

Website
- Official website

Chikurin-ji (竹林寺) is a Buddhist temple located in the Arisato neighborhood of the city of Ikoma, Nara Prefecture, Japan. It belongs to the Ritsu sect and its honzon is a statue of Monju Bosatsu. The temple is known as the location of the grave of the Nara period prelate Gyōki.

== Overview ==
Chikurin-ji is located in the mountains at the eastern foot of Mount Ikoma. The history of the temple is uncertain; however, it is believed to have started as a small hermitage that Gyōki founded in his lifetime, and which was elevated into a temple after his death. The temple's name comes from a temple of the same name on Mount Wutai in China, a sacred place for the worship of Manjusri. Gyōki, who was active in social work such as bridge construction and flood control during the Nara period and also played an important role in the construction of the Great Buddha of Todai-ji, came to be regarded as an incarnation of Manjusri. The Gyōki Nenpu (written in 1175), one of the basic sources for Gyōki research, states that in 707, when Gyōki was 40 years old, he moved to "Ikuma Senbo." Meanwhile, the Chikurinji Ayakuroku (written in 1305) by Gyōnen, a scholar of Tōdai-ji, states that Gyōki entered Mount Ikoma in 704 and lived at "Kayano Senbo." There is no certainty that "Ikuma Senbo" and "Kusano Senbo" are the same, or that they correspond to the current Chikurin-ji, but considering that Gyōki's grave is located here, it is assumed that Chikurin-ji is the successor to "Ikuma Senbo." The official history Shoku Nihongi has an entry for November 20, 773, which states that "Of the 40-odd temples where Gyōki trained, six have fallen into disrepair, so we will donate three or two chō of rice fields to each of them," and Ikuma-in is listed as one of those six temples. This suggests that the temple had already fallen into disrepair only twenty years after Gyōki's death. According to the Chikurin-ji Engi scroll, written by a monk named Jakumetsu in 1235, about five centuries later, Jakumetsu and his companions dug up Gyōki's grave on Mount Ikoma following a revelation from Gyōki in a dream, and discovered a relic jar (a cinerary vessel) and a tombstone. The contents of the tombstone are preserved in the documents of Tōshōdai-ji, and according to which, Gyōki was cremated at the "eastern tomb of Mount Ikuma" after his death at Sugawara-dera (now Kikō-ji Temple in Nara City). Gyōki's relic jar and tombstone were reburied, but a small fragment of the copper tombstone was excavated at the end of the Edo period and became the property of a local individual. On November 11, 1933, this was designated an Important Cultural Property under the name "Fragment of Gyōki's Copper Relic Vase" and is currently in the possession of the Nara National Museum.

The temple was later rebuilt by Eison and his disciple Ninshō, but it was abandoned due to the anti-Buddhist movement at the start of the Meiji era. It was not until 1997 that it was rebuilt.

Gyōki’s grave is a square mound with sides of about 10 meters. It appears to have been created by carving out the mountain or piling up the earth. In 1921, it was designated a National Historic Site.

Chikurin-ji is 1.2 km southwest of Ichibu Station on the Kintetsu Ikoma Line.

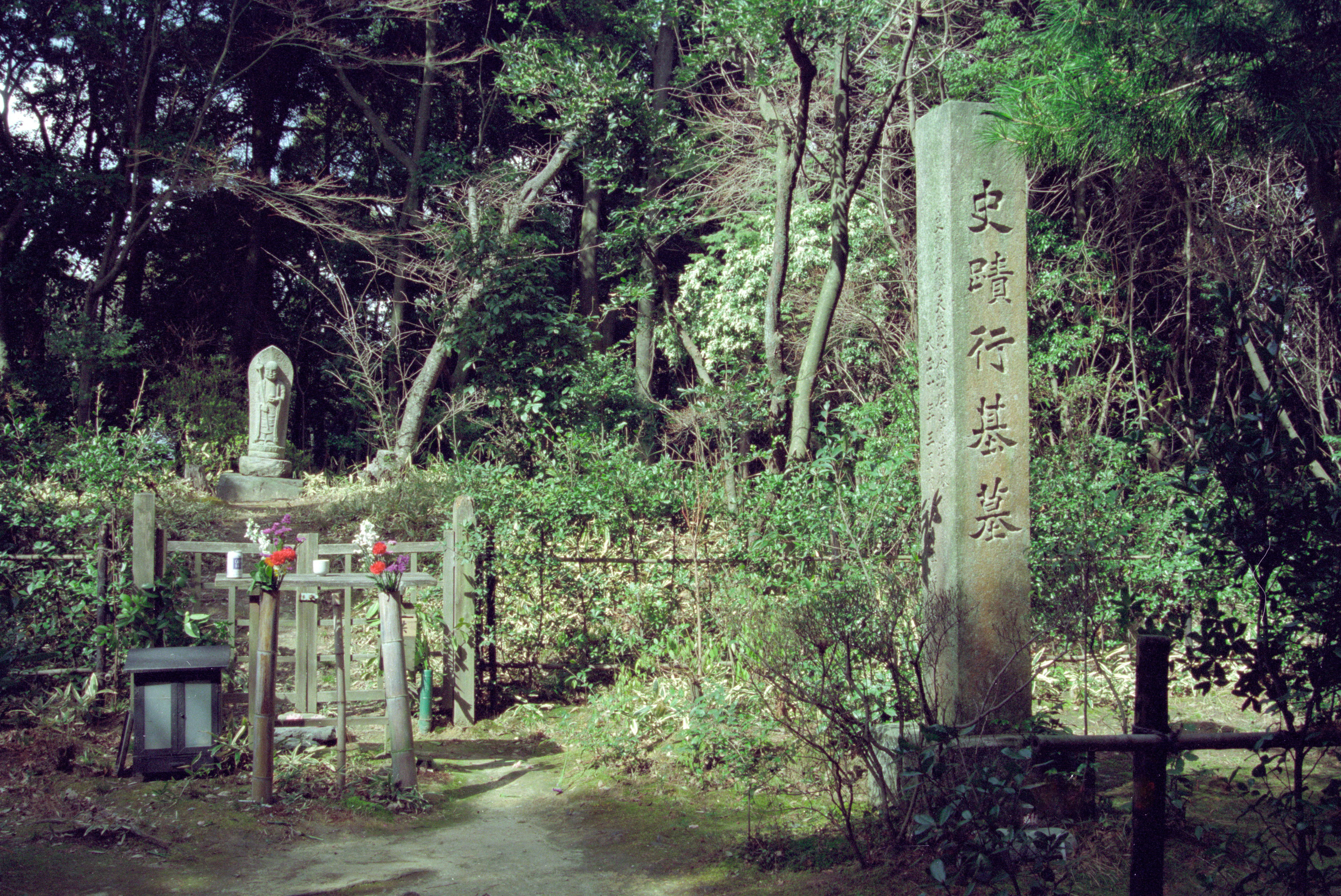
Tomb of Gyoki

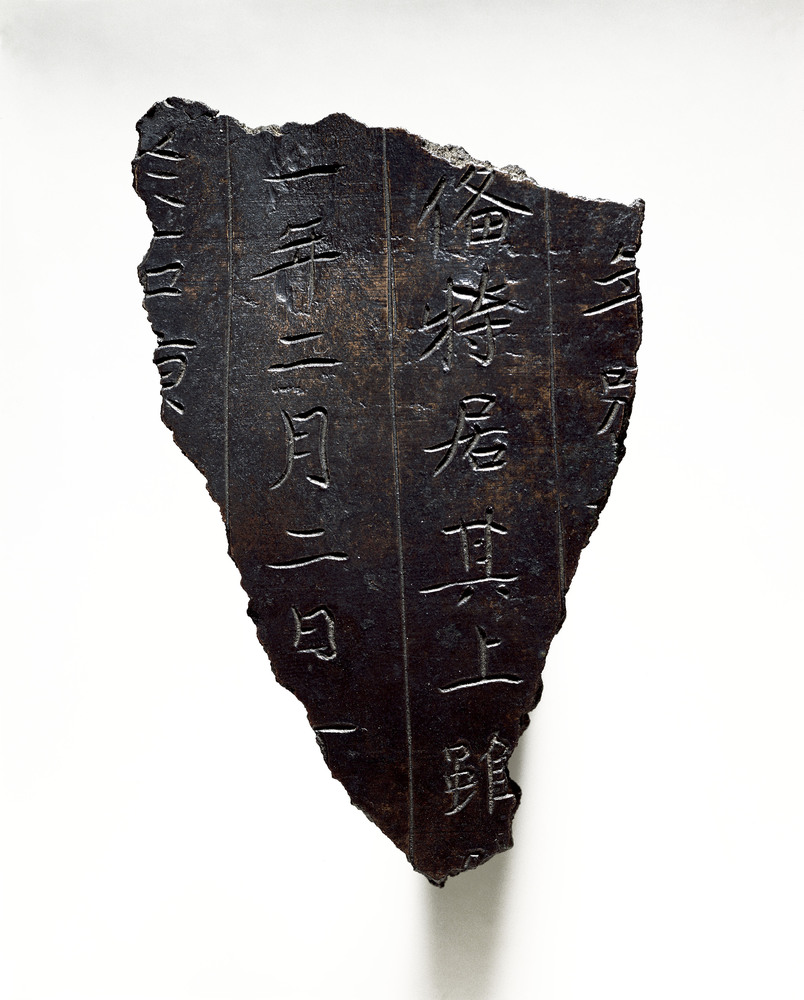
Fragment of Gyōki's Copper Relic Vase

== Cultural Properties ==
=== National Important Cultural Properties ===
- Items excavated from the tomb of Ninshō (竹林寺忍性墓出土品), The remains of Ninsho, the monk who founded Gokuraku-ji in Kamakura and devoted himself to the restoration of Buddhist precepts and social work during the Kamakura period, were divided into three locations according to his will: Gokuraku-ji, Kakuan-ji (Yamatokoriyama, Nara), and Chikurin-ji Temple. The bronze ossuary and stone chest were found during an excavation in 1986 (currently kept at Tōshōdai-ji).

In addition, a wooden seated statue of Gyōki formerly enshrined at Chikurin-ji, was moved to Tōshōdai-ji after Chikurin-ji was abolished during the Meiji era's anti-Buddhist movement. It is also a National Important Cultural Property.

== See also ==
- List of Historic Sites of Japan (Nara)
