= Nara National Research Institute for Cultural Properties =

Japanese research institute

Coordinates: 34°41′30.20″N 135°47′17.20″E

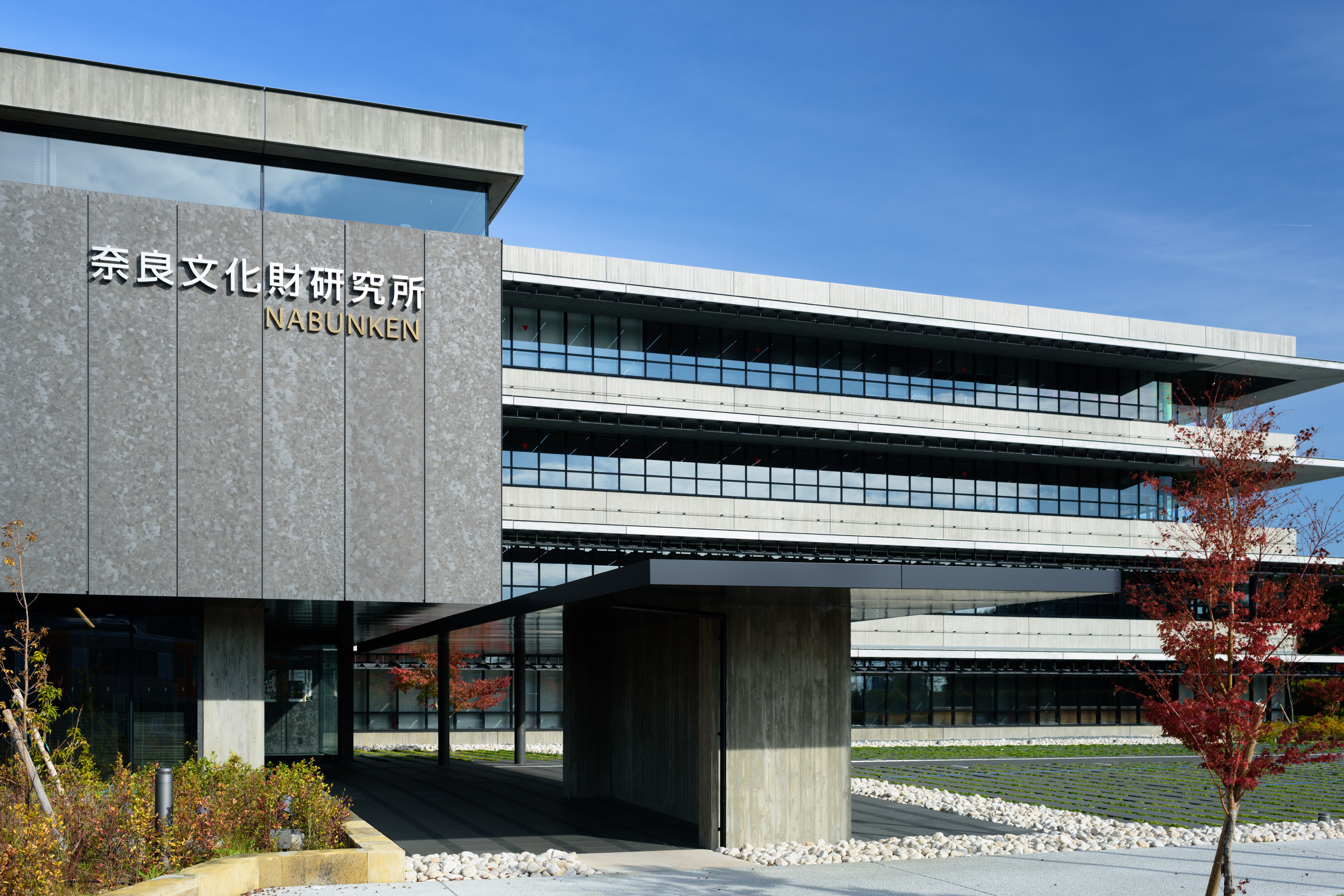
Nara National Research Institute for Cultural Properties 奈良文化財研究所 Headquarters of Nara National Research Institute for Cultural Properties
- Established: 1952
- Director General: Matsumura Keiji
- Address: 2-9-1, Nijo-cho, Nara City 630-8577 Japan
- Location: Nara, Nara Prefecture, Japan
- Website: Home Page(in English); Home Page(in Japanese)

The Nara National Research Institute for Cultural Properties (奈良文化財研究所, Nara Bunkazai Kenkyū-jo), also known by its former name, the Nara Research Institute for Cultural Properties, is one of two research institutes that comprise the National Institutes for Cultural Heritage, an independent administrative institution created in 2001. Established in April 1952 as part of the National Commission for Protection of Cultural Properties,^{A} the institute is located in the city of Nara, in Nara Prefecture, Japan, with branches elsewhere in Nara Prefecture. The institute is divided into departments for the excavation and restoration of the Asuka Palace, the Fujiwara Palace, and the Heijō Palace, historical remains, gardens, and other archaeological sites, and for the study of documents from Japan's early history. The Asuka Historical Museum is also managed by the institute.

== History ==
=== Timeline ===
- 1952 - The institute was established under the National Commission for Protection of Cultural Properties
- 1968 - The institute moved to the Agency for Cultural Affairs, Japanese Ministry of Education
- 2001 - Independent Administrative Institution National Research Institute for Cultural Properties is created by merger of the Tokyo Research Institute for Cultural Properties, and the National Research Institute for Cultural Properties, Nara.
- 2007 - Independent Administrative Institution National Institutes for Cultural Heritage is established by merging two Independent Administrative Institutions—the Independent Administrative Institution National Research Institute for Cultural Properties, which had been created in 2001; plus the Independent Administrative Institution National Museum (the IAI National Museum), also created in 2001. The IAI National Museum had been created by merging the Tokyo National Museum, the Kyoto National Museum, the Nara National Museum in 2001; and the Kyushu National Museum had been incorporated into the organization in 2005.

== Organizational structure ==
- Department of Planning and Coordination
  - Planning and Coordination Section
  - Data and Information Cooperation Section
  - International Cooperation Section
  - Exhibition Section
  - Photography Section
- Department of Cultural Heritage
  - Historical Document Section
  - Architectural History Section
  - Cultural Landscape Section
  - Site Stabilization Section
- Department of Imperial Palace Sites Investigations
  - Archaeology Section 1
  - Archaeology Section 2
  - Archaeology Section 3
  - History Section
  - Architectural Feature Section
- Center for Archaeological Operations
  - Conservation Science Section
  - Environmental Archaeology Section
  - Dating Section
  - Archaeological Research Methodology Section
- Asuka Historical Museum (Asuka, Nara Prefecture)
  - Curatorial Section
  - Affairs Section

== Transportation ==
The Nara National Research Institute for Cultural Properties is located in close proximity to the Yamato-Saidaiji Station on the Kintetsu Nara Line, Kyoto Line, and Kashihara Line.

== Footnote ==
A.The home page of the Institute dates its establishment to April 1952; other sources list 1972.
