= Byakugō-ji =

Buddhist temple in Nara, Nara, Japan

- 白毫寺
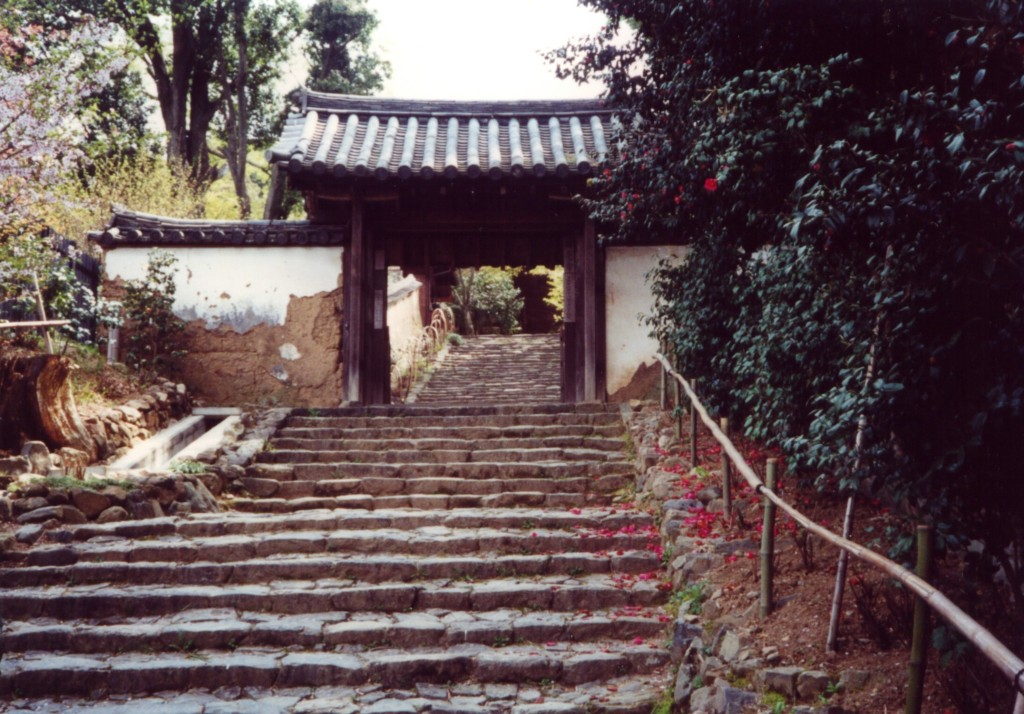
- Approach

- Location within Nara Prefecture Location within Japan

Religion
- Affiliation: Buddhist
- Deity: Amida Nyorai
- Rite: Shingon Ritsu
- Status: functional

Location
- Location: 392 Byakugōji-chō, Nara-shi, Nara-ken
- Coordinates: 34°40′15.65″N 135°51′4.35″E

Architecture
- Founder: Gonsō or Gonzō (acc. legend)
- Completed: c.715
- National Important Cultural Property

Byakugō-ji (白毫寺) is a Buddhist temple located in the city of Nara, Nara Prefecture Japan. It belongs to the Shingon Ritsu sect of Japanese Buddhism and its honzon is a statue of Amida Nyorai .The temple's full name is Takamado-san Byakugo-Ritsu-ji (高円山白毫律寺). The byakugō or urna is the curl of white hair between the eyebrows that is one of the thirty-two physical characteristics of the Buddha.

== History ==
Byakugō-ji only appears in historical records from the Kamakura period onward, and the temple's founding is unclear. According to tradition, Prince Shiki had a mountain villa on the site during the Wadō era (708-715) of the Nara period. According to the Sugawara family's "Collection of Temple Histories," this temple was a sub-temple of Iwabuchi-dera, built at the foot of Mount Takamado by Kinso, a monk of the Sanron school and Kukai's teacher.

According to the Nanto Byakugō-ji Issaikyo Engi (1335), the temple was restored by Eison, the founder of the Shingon Ritsu sect centered at Saidai-ji in the Kamakura period. Eison was noted for restoring many ancient temples which had fallen into ruins, and for carrying out social works. According to the same history, the second restorer, Dōshō, brought the complete Buddhist canon in 1261 and built a sutra repository within the temple the following year, 1262, to house it. As a result, the temple also came to be known as Issaikyō-ji. The colophon of a sutra scroll from 1220 preserved at Kōshō-ji reads "within the collection of the Byakugō-ji Sutras," which is considered the first historical mention of "Byakugō-ji." The temple still possesses a group of Buddhist statues from the Kamakura period, including the principal image of Amida Nyorai and statues of Emma-ō and his attendants (Taizan-ō, Shimei, and Shiroku) that were enshrined in the Enma-dō.

According to the Daijōin Jisha Zatsuji-ki (Miscellaneous Records of Daijōin Temple and Shrines), the temple was caught in a fire during a conflict between the Furuichi and Tsutsui clans in 1497, and all of its buildings, including the main hall, Enma-dō, Tahō-tō pagoda, and sutra repository, were destroyed. The aforementioned Buddhist statues from the Kamakura period were removed from the hall where they were enshrined, but they were damaged by fire during that process. The statue of Taizan-ō bears a repair inscription from Meio 7 (1498), the year after the fire.

According to the historical document Zoku Nanko Zatsuroku, the temple was again destroyed by fire in 1520 during ongoing conflict between the Furuichi and Tsutsui clans. It was rebuilt during the Kan'ei era of the Edo period (1624-1645) by Kukei, a scholar-monk of Kōfuku-ji, only to be destroyed again by fire again in 1757. The current Main Hall suffered damaged in the Sengoku period and was rebuilt in the early Edo period. The temple's Muromachi period Tahōtō Pagoda was sold to private buyer in 1917 and its location was unknown for many years; however, it was later discovered to have been moved to a villa in Takarazuka, Hyōgo, where it was destroyed by a forest fire in 2002. At Byakugō-ji, the pagoda's foundation stones remain.

Byakugō-ji is 63rd in the Eighty-Eight Sacred Sites of Northern Yamato (大和北部八十八ヶ所霊場), a pilgrimage route of eighty-eight sacred sites located in northern Yamato Province, which was established during the mid-Edo period (Meiwa era, 1764-1772). Some of the temples along the route are now abandoned or uninhabited.

== Gallery ==
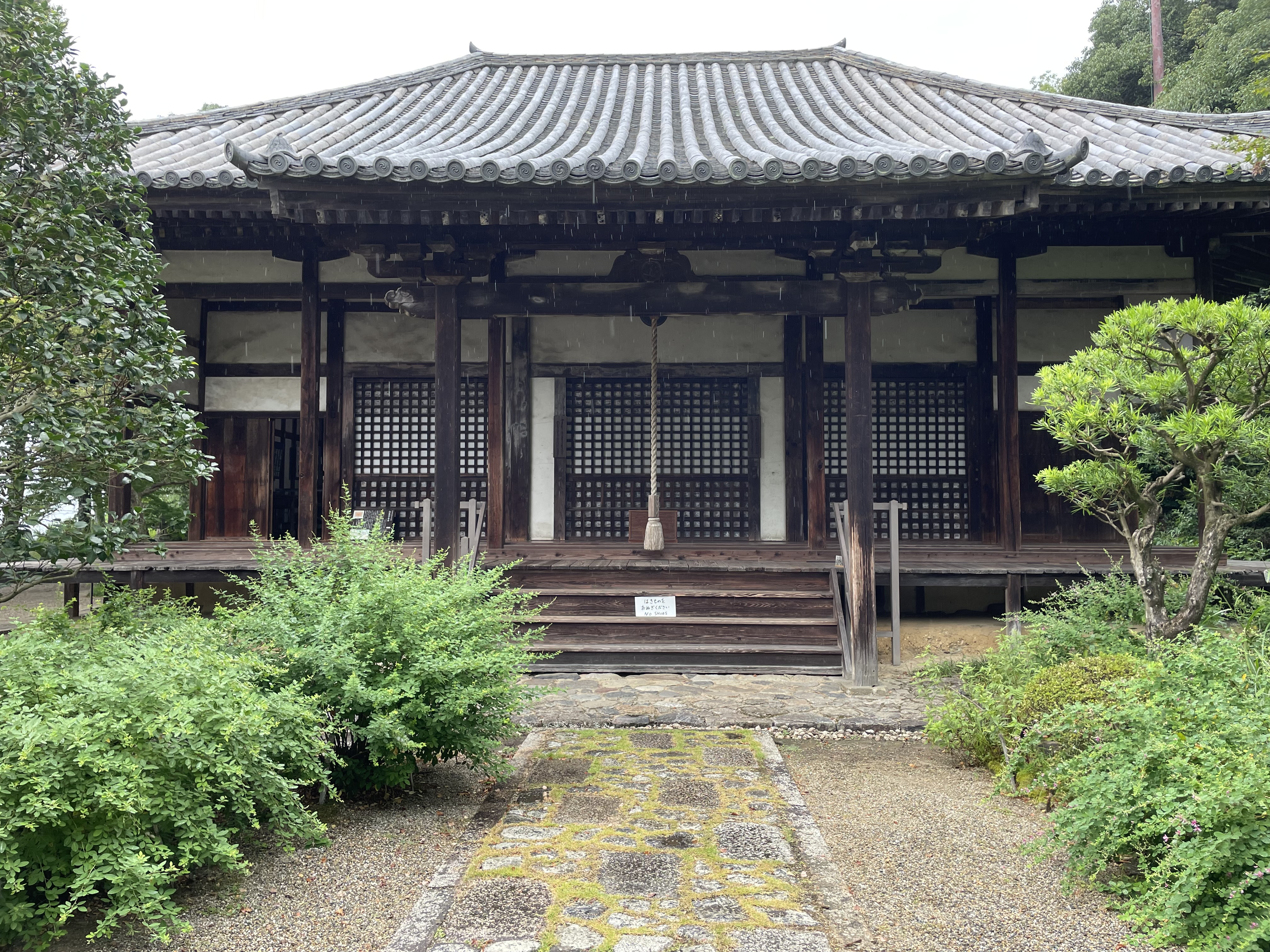
Hondō

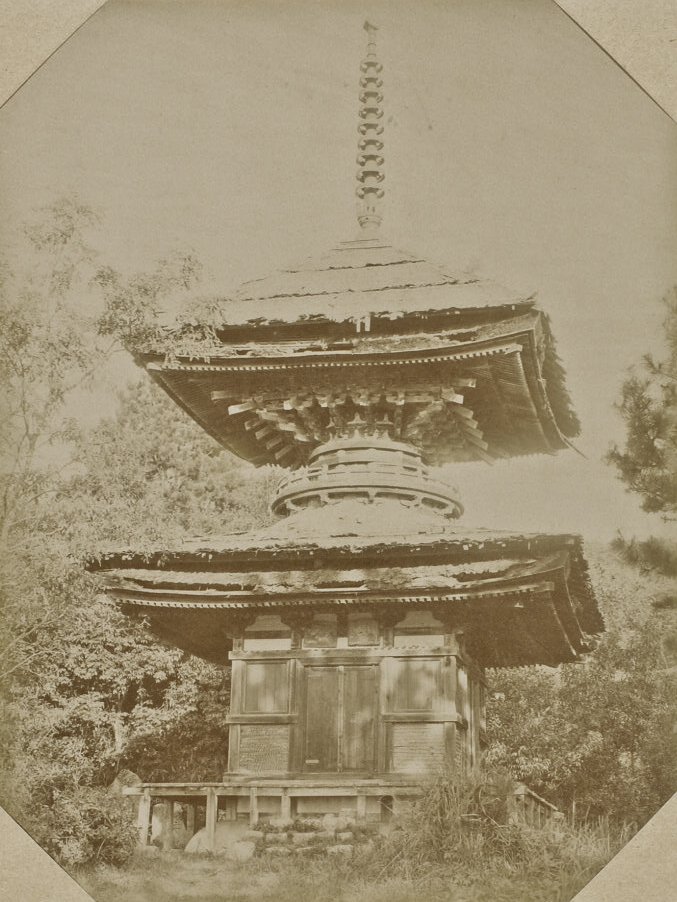
former Tahōtō Pagoda

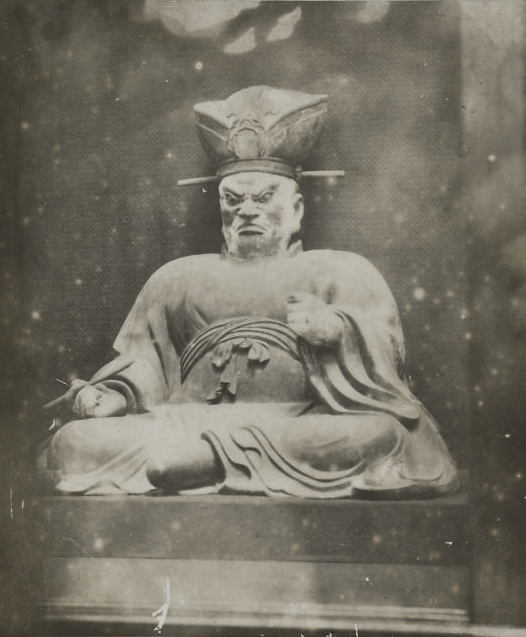
Taizan-ō by Kōen (ICP)

== Cultural Properties ==
=== Important Cultural Properties ===
- Wooden statue of seated Amida Nyorai (木造阿弥陀如来坐像), late Heian to early Kamakura period. The principal image of the temple, it is made of hinoki cypress wood using the yoseki-zukuri technique.
- Wooden statue of seated Bosatsu (木造菩薩坐像), early Heian period (9th century). Attributed to Monju Bosatsu, this was he principal image of the Tahōtō pagoda, it is made of hinoki cypress wood using the yoseki-zukuri technique.
- Wooden statue of standing Jizo Bosatsu (木造地蔵菩薩立像), late Kamakura period.
- Wooden statue of seated Kōshō Bosatsu (木造興正菩薩坐像), late Kamakura period. This is a portrait statue of the priest Eison depicting the priest in his later years.
- Wooden statue of seated Enma-ō (木造閻魔王坐像), Kamakura period.
- Wooden statue of seated Taizan-ō (木造太山王坐像), Kamakura period. (1259) inscriptions inside the statue indicate that it was carved by Kōen, the grandson of Unkei. Repairs were carried out in 1497, as indicated by another inscription inside the statue.
- Wooden statues of half-seated Shimei and Shiroku (木造司命半跏像・司録半跏像), Kamakura period. Attendants of Enma-ō these statues are works of the Kōen school.

=== Nara Prefecture Designated Natural Monument ===
- Goshiki Tsubaki (Five-Colored Camellia) (五色椿) - Famous as one of the "Three Famous Camellias of Nara," along with the Norikoboshi at Tōdai-ji's Kaisan-dō and the Chiri Tsubaki at Denkō-ji. It is believed to have been transplanted from Kita-in, a sub-temple of Kōfuku-ji, during the Kan'ei era (1624-1645).

=== Nara City Designated Tangible Cultural Property ===
- Hondō (本堂), Edo period (first half of the seventeenth century).
