= Gokuraku-ji (Kamakura) =

Buddhist temple in Kamakura, Kanagawa, Japan

Coordinates: 35°18′37″N 139°31′42″E

Gokuraku-ji 極楽寺
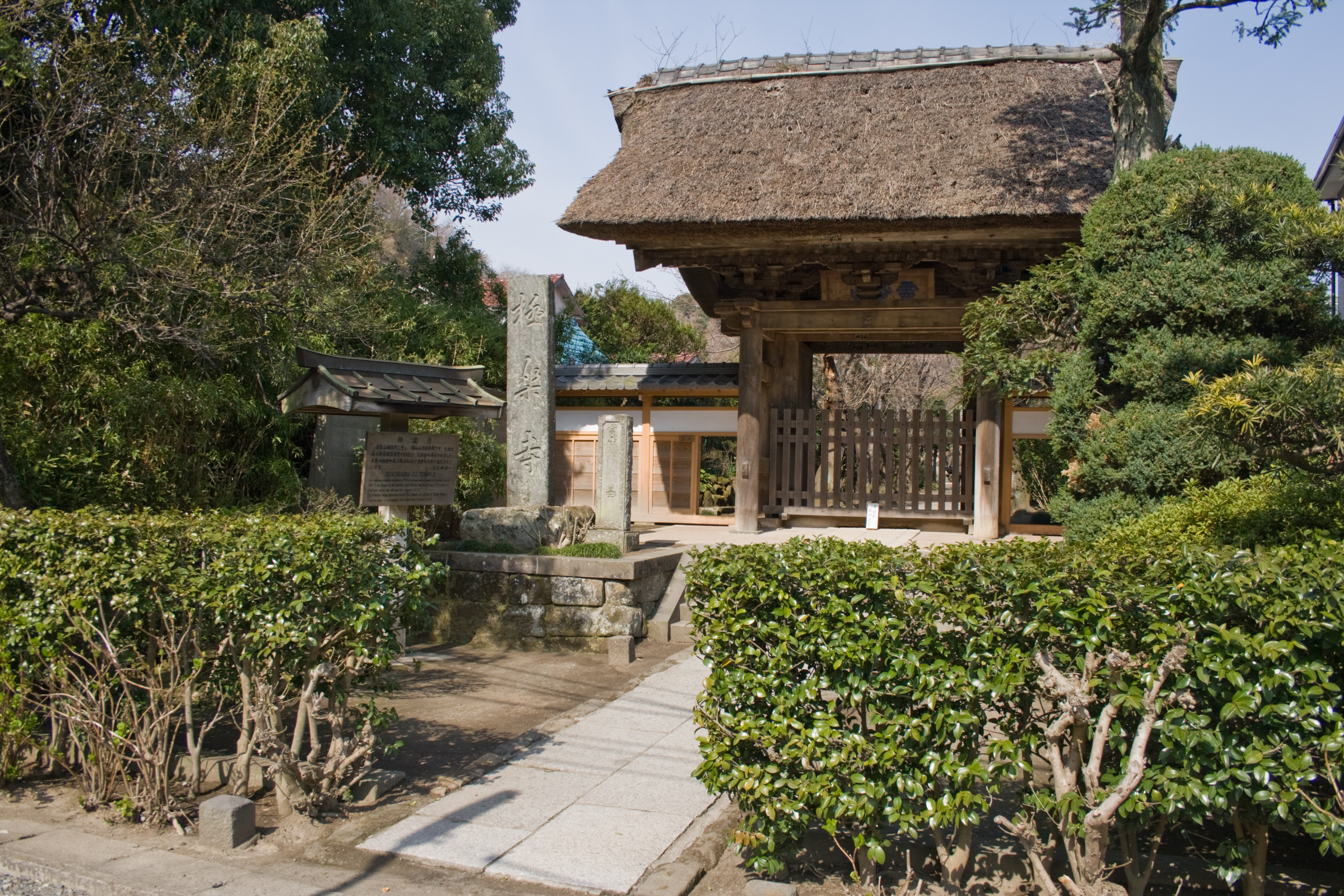
- The gate of Gokuraku-ji

Religion
- Affiliation: Shingon Ritsu
- Deity: Shaka Nyorai (Śākyamuni)

Location
- Location: 3-6-7 Gokuraku-ji; Kamakura, Kanagawa Prefecture
- Country: Japan
- Interactive map of Gokuraku-ji 極楽寺

Architecture
- Founder: Ninshō and Hōjō Shigetoki
- Completed: 1259

Gokuraku-ji (極楽寺) is a Buddhist temple of the Shingon sect located in Kamakura, Kanagawa Prefecture, Japan. It was founded in 1259 by Ninshō (1217–1303) and has been restored and rebuilt many times since then.
