= Renge-in Tanjō-ji =

Buddhist temple in Kumamoto, Japan

Renge-in Tanjō-ji 蓮華院誕生寺
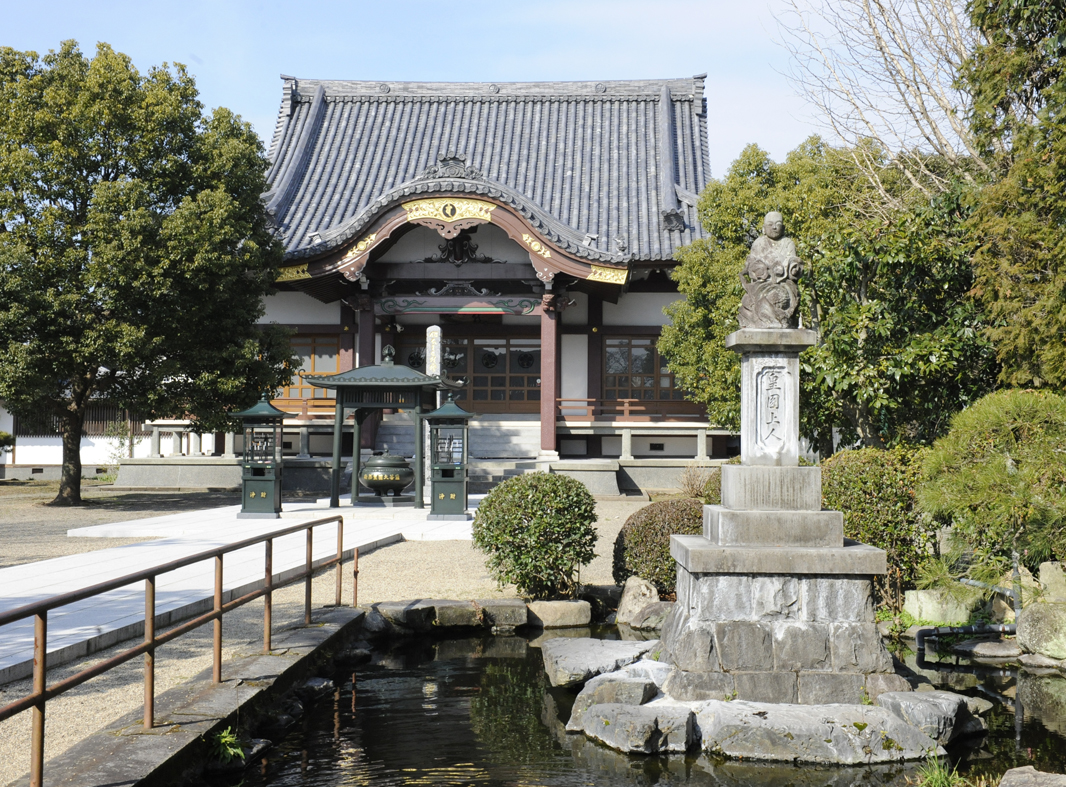
- Main Hall and Sakuraga Pond

Religion
- Affiliation: Shingon Ritsu
- Deity: Kōen Daibosatsu
- Status: Special head temple

Location
- Location: 2288 Tsuiji, Tamana, Kumamoto Prefecture
- Country: Japan
- Interactive map of Renge-in Tanjō-ji 蓮華院誕生寺
- Coordinates: 32°55′57.6″N 130°32′7.5″E

Architecture
- Completed: Between the Heian and Kamakura periods

Website
- http://rengein.jp/

Renge-in Tanjō-ji (蓮華院誕生寺) is a Buddhist temple of the Shingon Risshu, or Shingon-Vinaya Buddhism, in Tamana, Kumamoto Prefecture. It is the head temple of the Shingon Ritsu school in Kyūshū and a branch temple of Saidai-ji (西大寺) in Nara (奈良). It venerates Mahābodhisattva Kōen (皇円大菩薩, Kōen Daibosatsu) as its patron deity. The temple stands on the site of Jōkō-ji Renge-in which was founded either at the end of the Heian period or the beginning of the Kamakura period and burnt down during the wars of the Sengoku period. The first abbot Zeshin Kawahara (1896–1977) was instructed through a spiritual communication by Kōen to restore Jōkō-ji Renge-in, which he accomplished in 1930 and renamed it Renge-in Tanjō-ji ("Birth Temple") in honor of the fact that it stands on the birthplace of Kōen.

== Addresses ==
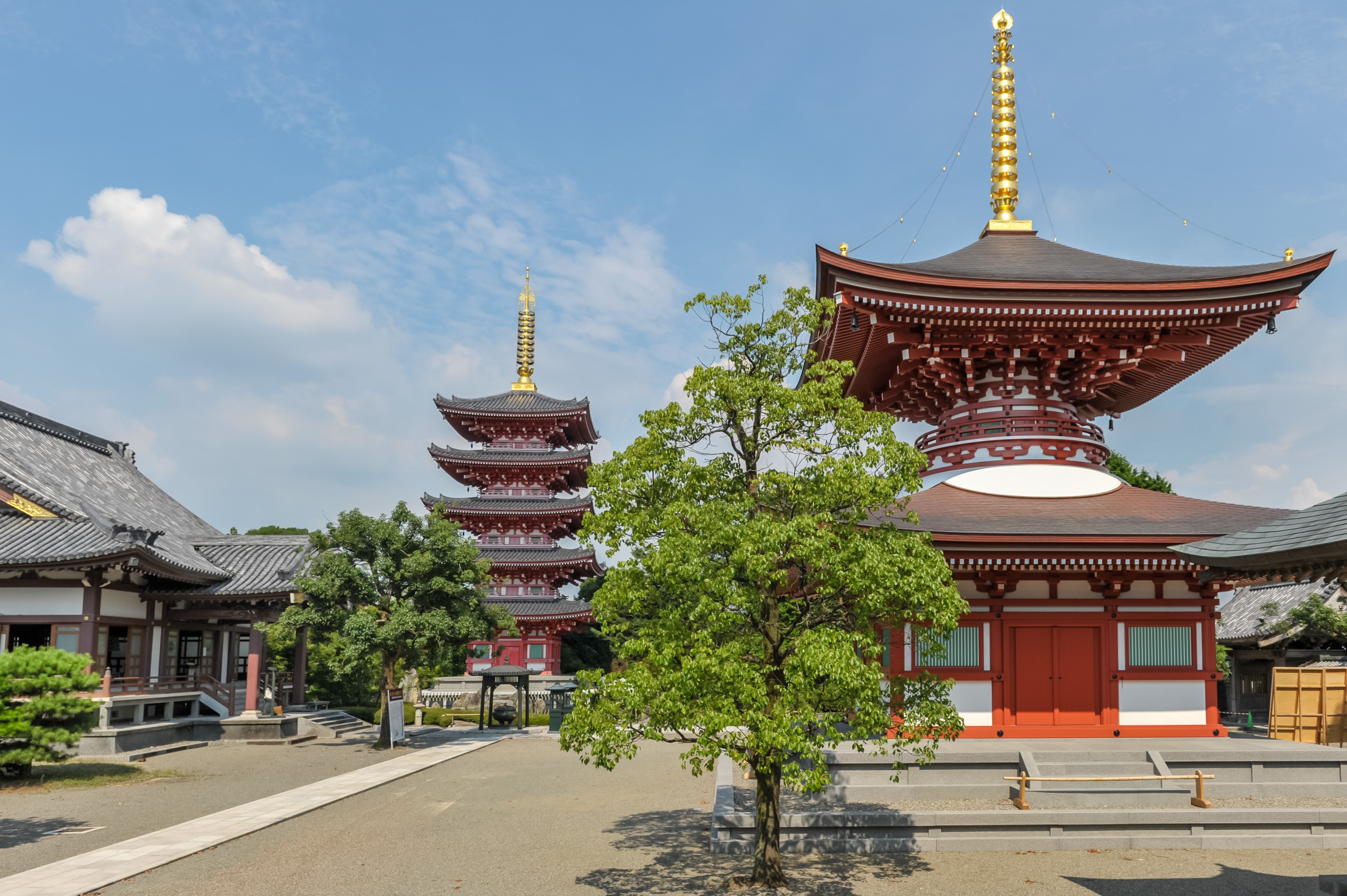
Tahōtō

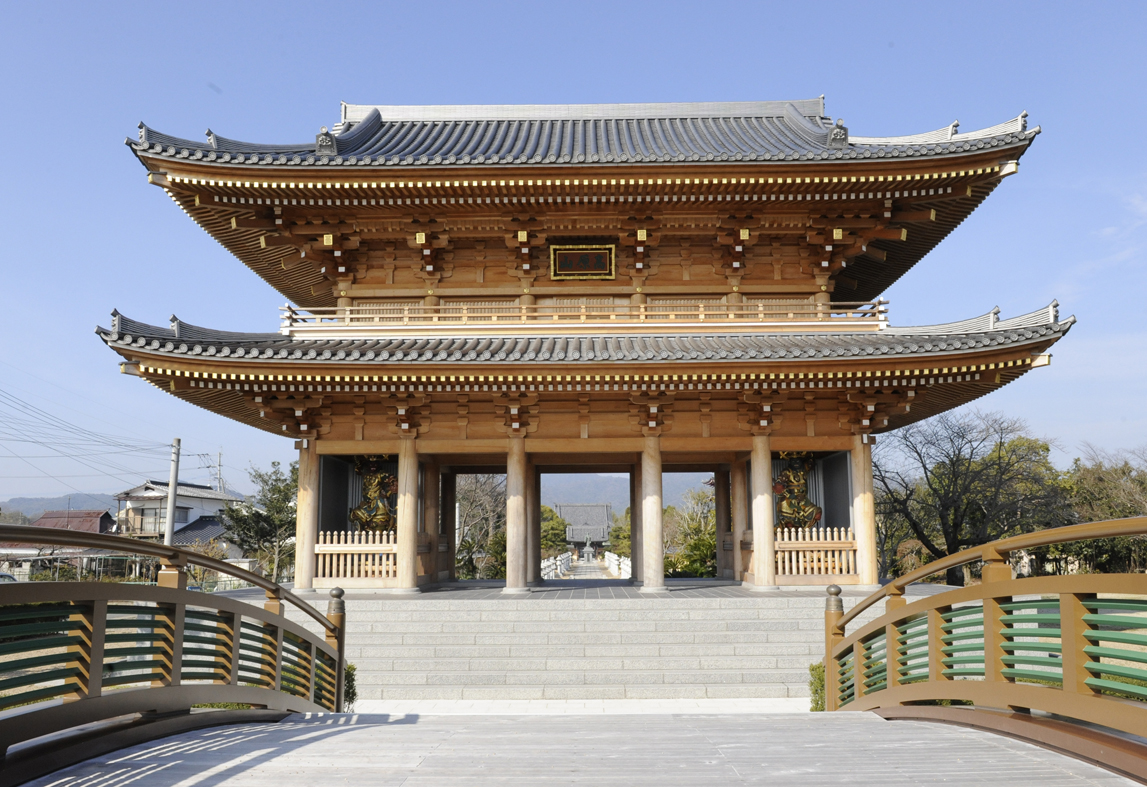
Great South Gate

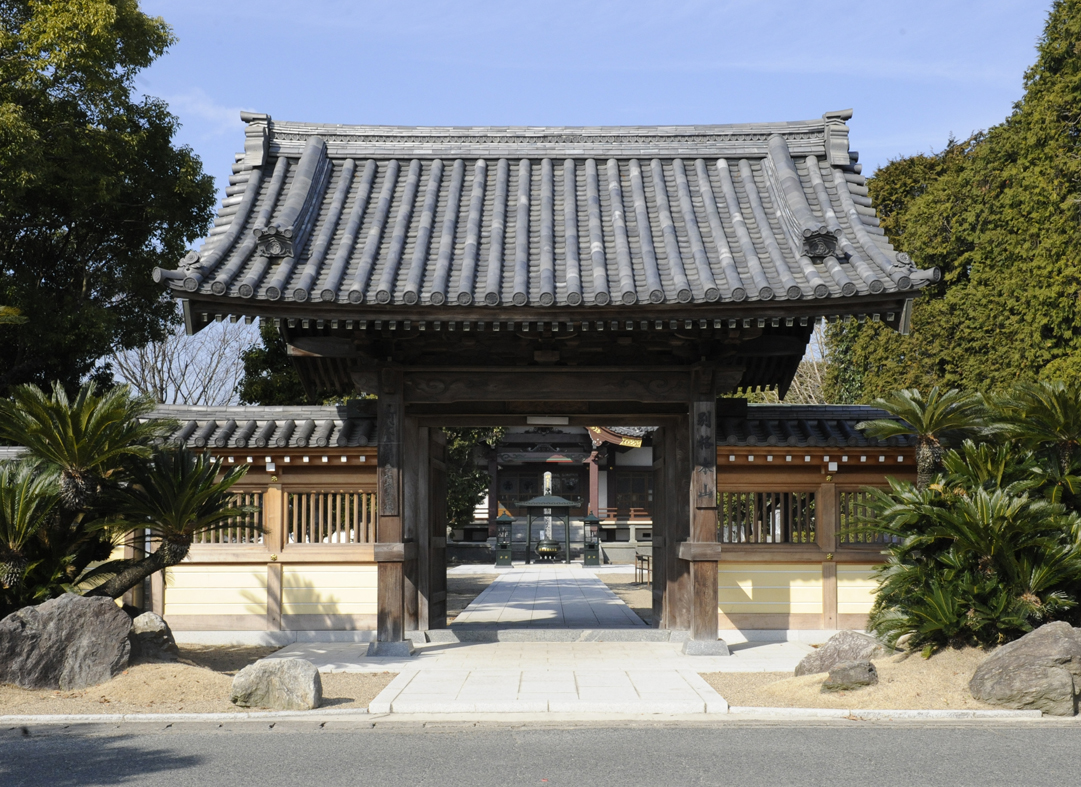
Inner Gate (延命門)

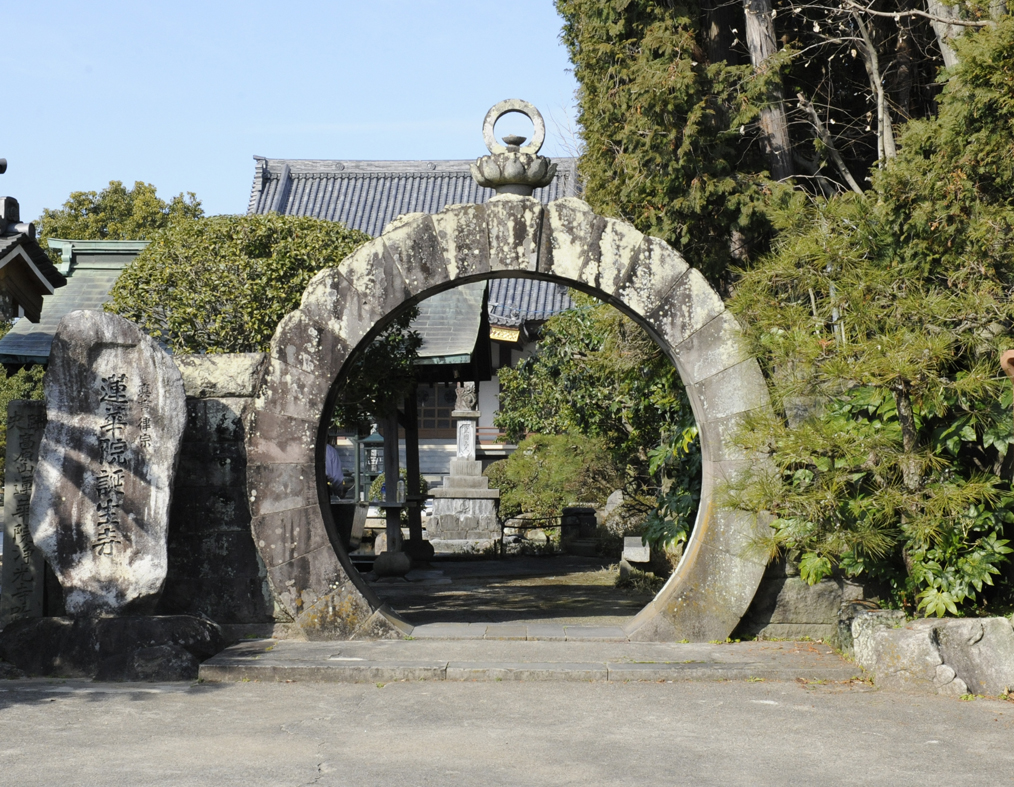
Circular Gate (蓮華門)

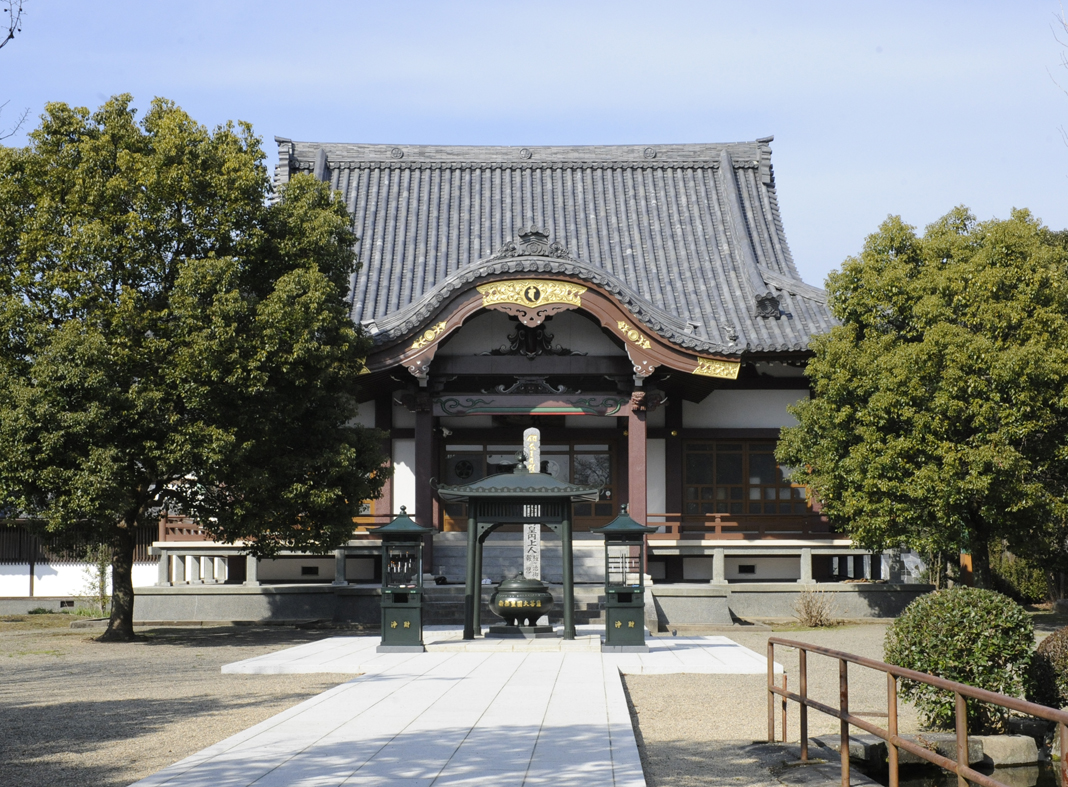
Main Hall

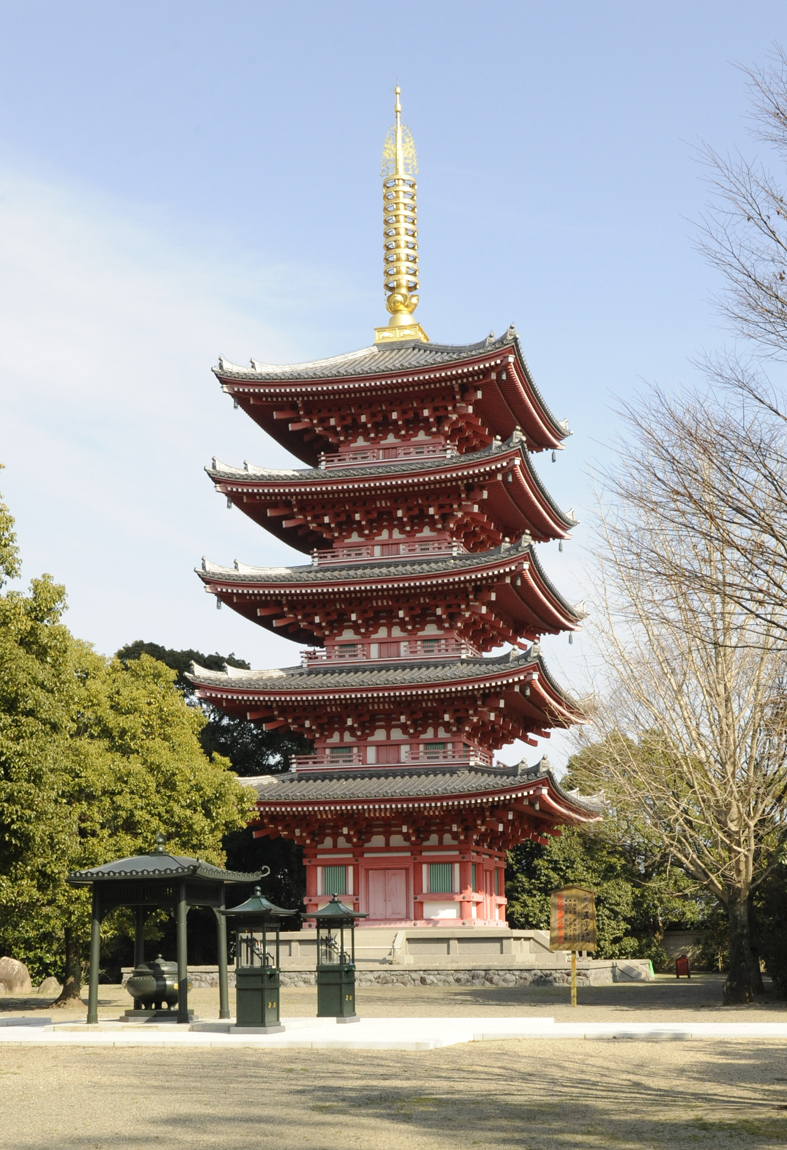
Five-story Pagoda

Main Temple: 2288 Tsuiji, Tamana, Kumamoto 865-0065

Oku-no-in: 1512-77 Tsuiji, Tamana, Kumamoto 865-0065

The temple consists of the Main Temple and the Oku-no-in, or the Inner Temple, which is located 2.5 miles north of the Main Temple on Mt. Shōdai.

== Abbots ==
- Zeshin Kawahara (1930–1977): born in 1896
- Shin-nyo Kawahara (1977–1992): born in 1926, former abbot of Tōmyō-ji in Saga Prefecture
- Eishō Kawahara (1992–): born in 1952, also former abbot of Tōmyō-ji

== Annual Events ==
At the temple, the 13th of each month is a festive day and the 3rd and the 23rd subsidiary festive days, and services are held on these days. A service comprises the reciting of Adhyardhaśatikā Prajñāpāramitā Sūtra (理趣経, Rishu-kyō) by the monks and various sutras designated for the lay devotees in Shingon Buddhism by the monks along with the devotees followed by a lecture by the abbot. The 13th of June is set apart as the day of the Great Festival to commemorate the death of Kōen. On the night of the 12th, the marching of the devotees from the Oku-no-in to the Main Temple with lanterns in hand, known as the Descent of the Dragon Fire (龍火下り, Ryūbi-kudari), takes place; a special service is held early next morning.

A Kudoku-gyō (功徳行, Merit-accumulating Practice) is provided once a month in the Five-story Pagoda at the Oku-no-in, where also is held the Great Autumn Festival on November 3 and the Joya-no-kane Service in which the Great Brahma Bell is rung repeatedly on December 31.

== Patron Deity ==
Mahābodhisattva Kōen is venerated as the patron deity. Kōen (皇円) was a Tendai monk in the latter part of the Heian period. Since he was said to have died on June 13, 1169, it is assumed that he was born in 1074.

Kōen was born in Tsuji, Tamana-shō in Higo Province as a great-great-grandson of Kampaku Fujiwara no Michikane (藤原道兼). His father was Fujiwara no Shigekane (藤原重兼), governor of Buzen Province. In his teens, he took the novice's ordination with Kōgaku (皇覚), a master of Sugiu School (椙生流), at Mt. Hiei, and studied Exoteric Buddhism under him. He furthered his education by studying Esoteric Buddhism with Jōen (成円). He started going by the name of Kōen around this time by taking a Chinese character from each of his masters' names. He lived in Kudoku-in on Mt. Hiei and became known as the Acharya of Higo (肥後阿闍梨, Higo Ajari). Hōnen who founded Jōdo-shū, a major school of Pure Land Buddhism, was ordained under Kōen in his last years and became his disciple.

He was also a noted scholar known for his erudition. He wrote Fusō Ryakki (扶桑略記, A Concise History of Japan), which is considered Japan's first chronicle detailing the events (mainly related to Buddhism) from the reign of Emperor Jimmu to that of Emperor Horikawa in the chronological order.

The actual circumstances of his death are unknown. According to the biographies of Hōnen written in the latter part of the Kamakura period, on June 13, 1169, Kōen commenced tantric practice in the form of a draconic deity in Sakuraga-ike Pond in Enshū. Sakuraga Pond is an actual dammed lake in Omaezaki, Shizuoka Prefecture.

== Timeline ==
- 1298 Jōkō-ji of Higo Province is mentioned in the Tōmyō-ji Document.
- 1581 Destroyed during a war
- 1929 In the early morning of December 10, Zeshin Kawahara receives a spiritual communication from Kōen ordering him to restore Renge-in.
- 1930 The Provisionary Main Hall completed on March 21.
- 1937 The Acharya Hall (阿闍梨堂, Ajari-dō) completed.
- 1940 The Circular Stone Gate completed.
- 1950 The World Peace Hall (世界平和祈念大願堂, Sekai-heiwa-kinen-daigan-dō) completed.
- 1966 The present Main Hall is completed.
- 1977 The Great Brahma Bell of Oku-no-in (大梵鐘, Daibonshō) is cast.
- 1978 Oku-no-in was founded on Mt. Shōdai on November 3. The Opening Ceremony performed.
- 1997 The Opening Ceremony for the Five-story Pagoda.
- 2005 From April 10 through 14th, the 14th Dalai Lama visits to perform the World Peace Homa Ceremony at the Main Temple and to lecture at the Oku-no-in.
- 2011 The Great South Gate is completed on May 23. The Opening Ceremony thereof as well as the Awakening Rite for the Four Heavenly Kings statues were performed.

== History ==
=== Foundation to Destruction ===
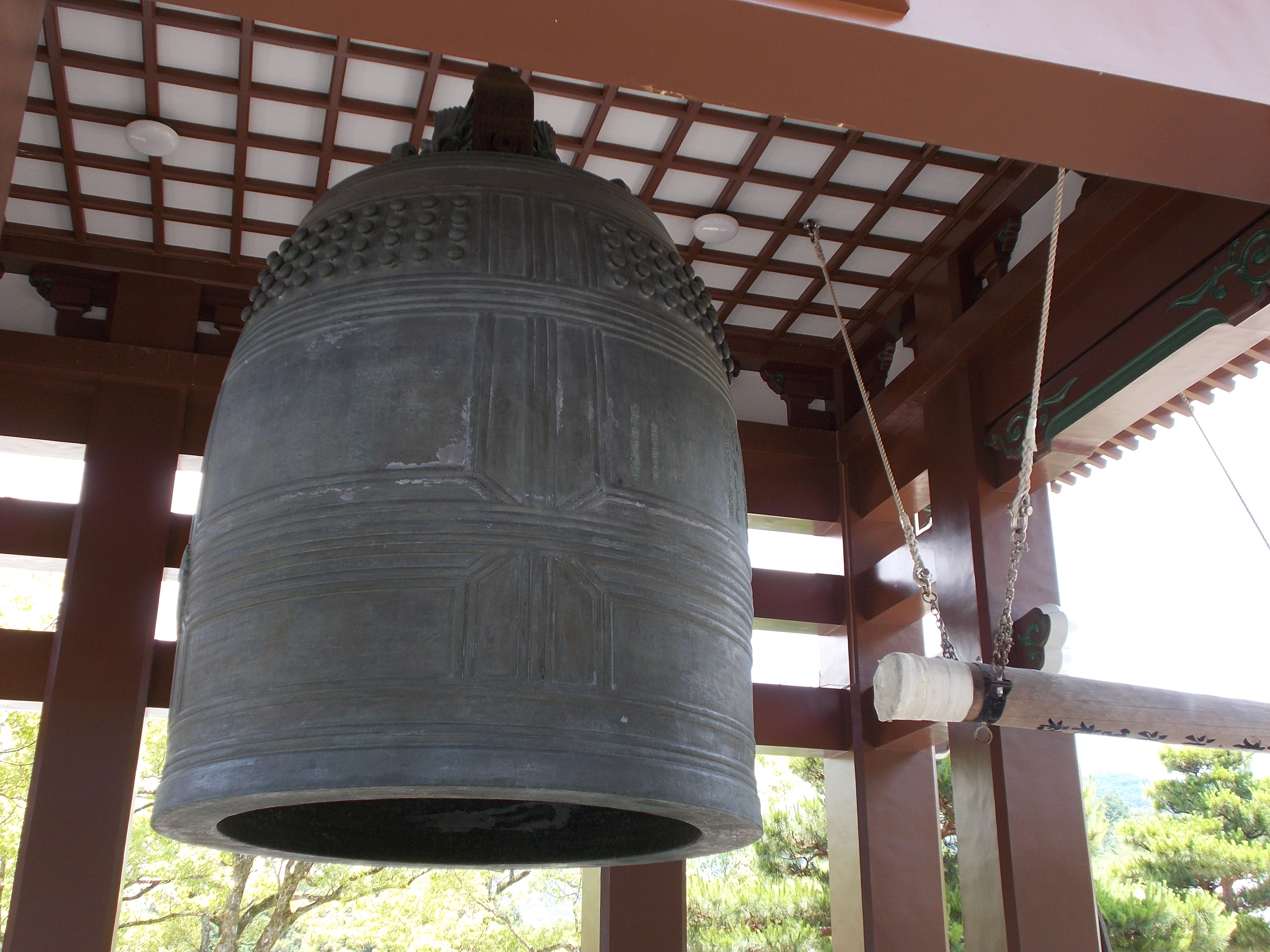
The Great Brahma Bell of Oku-no-in

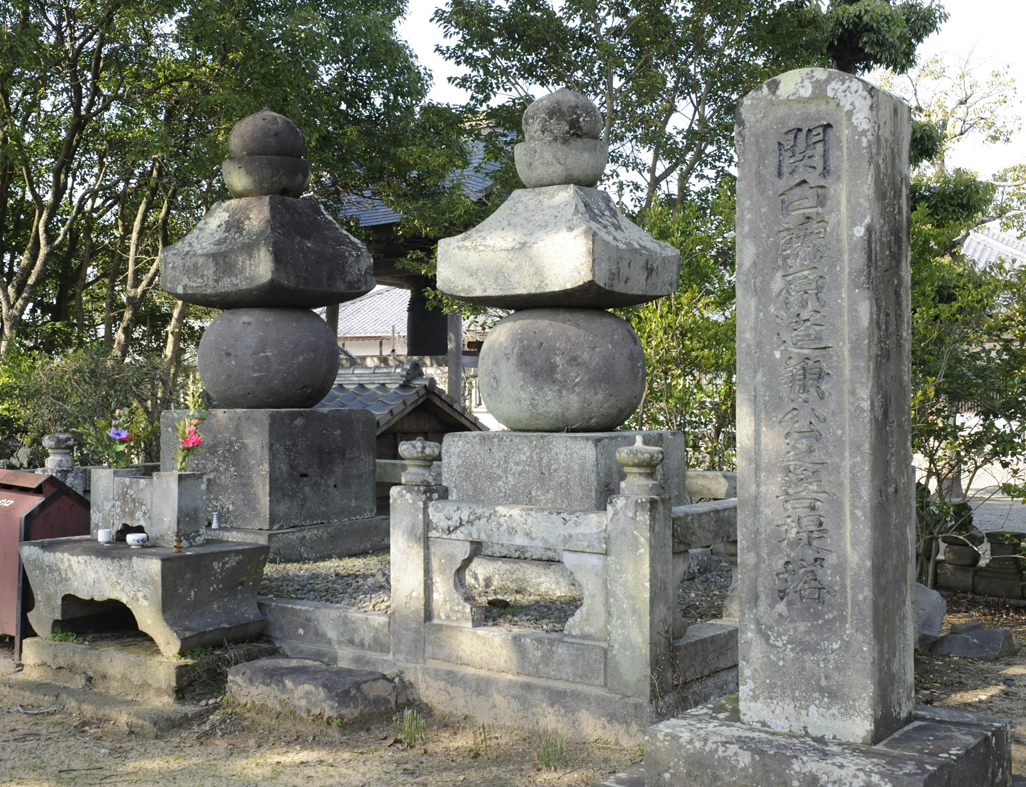
Five-ring Stupas, Municipal Cultural Properties of Tamana

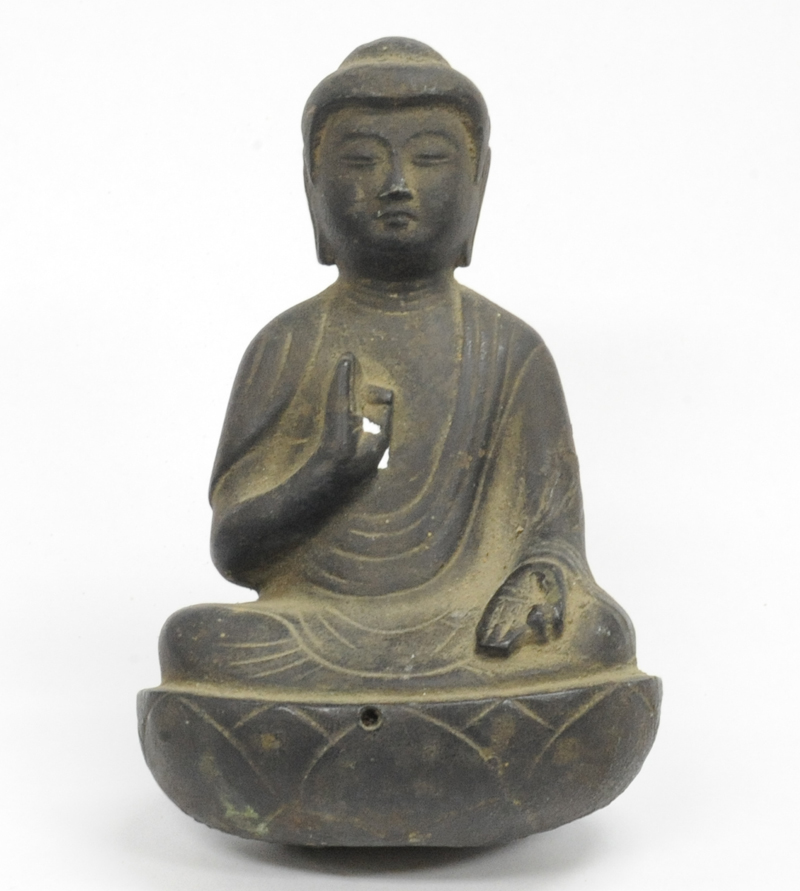
An excavated statuette

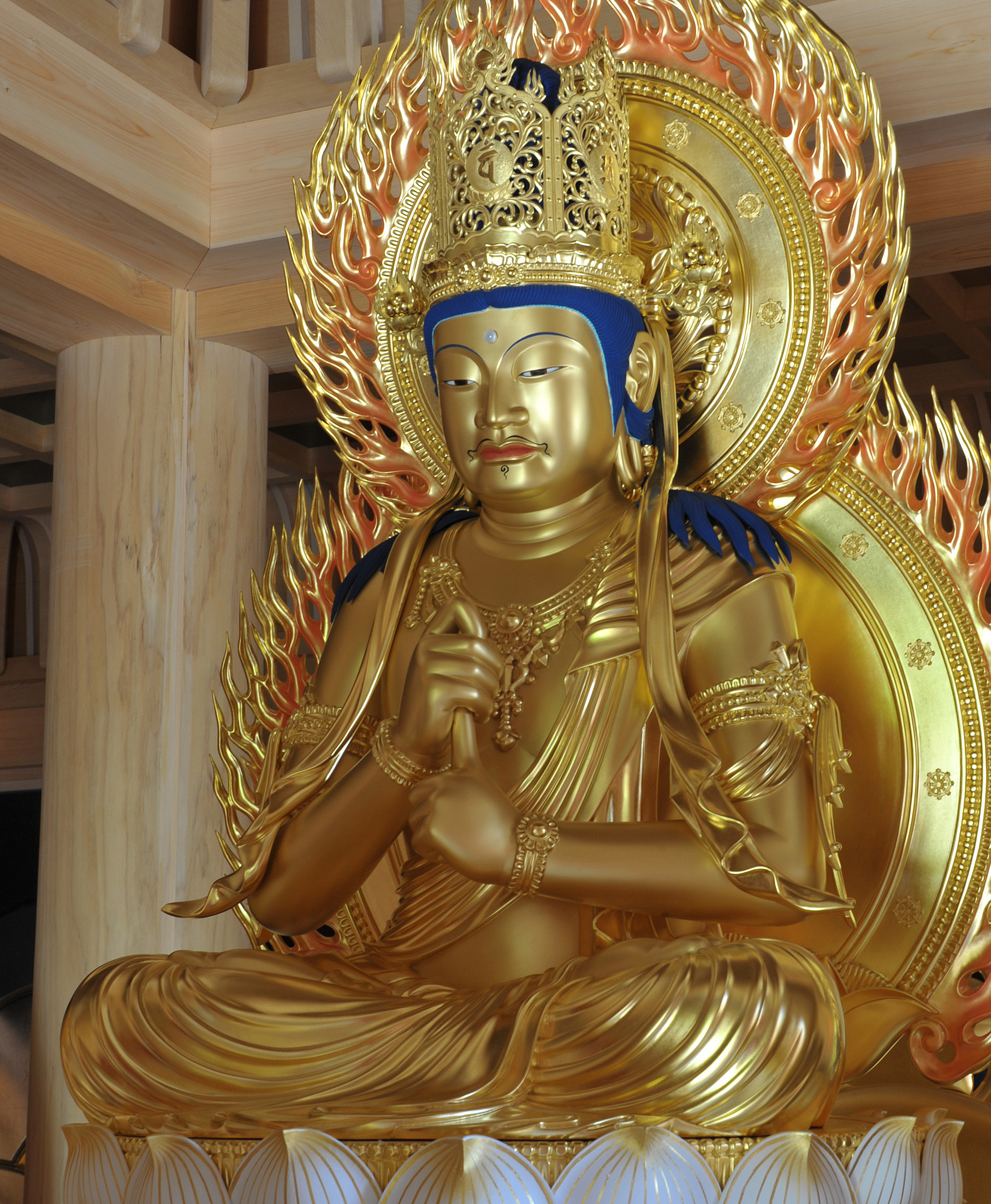
Vairocana

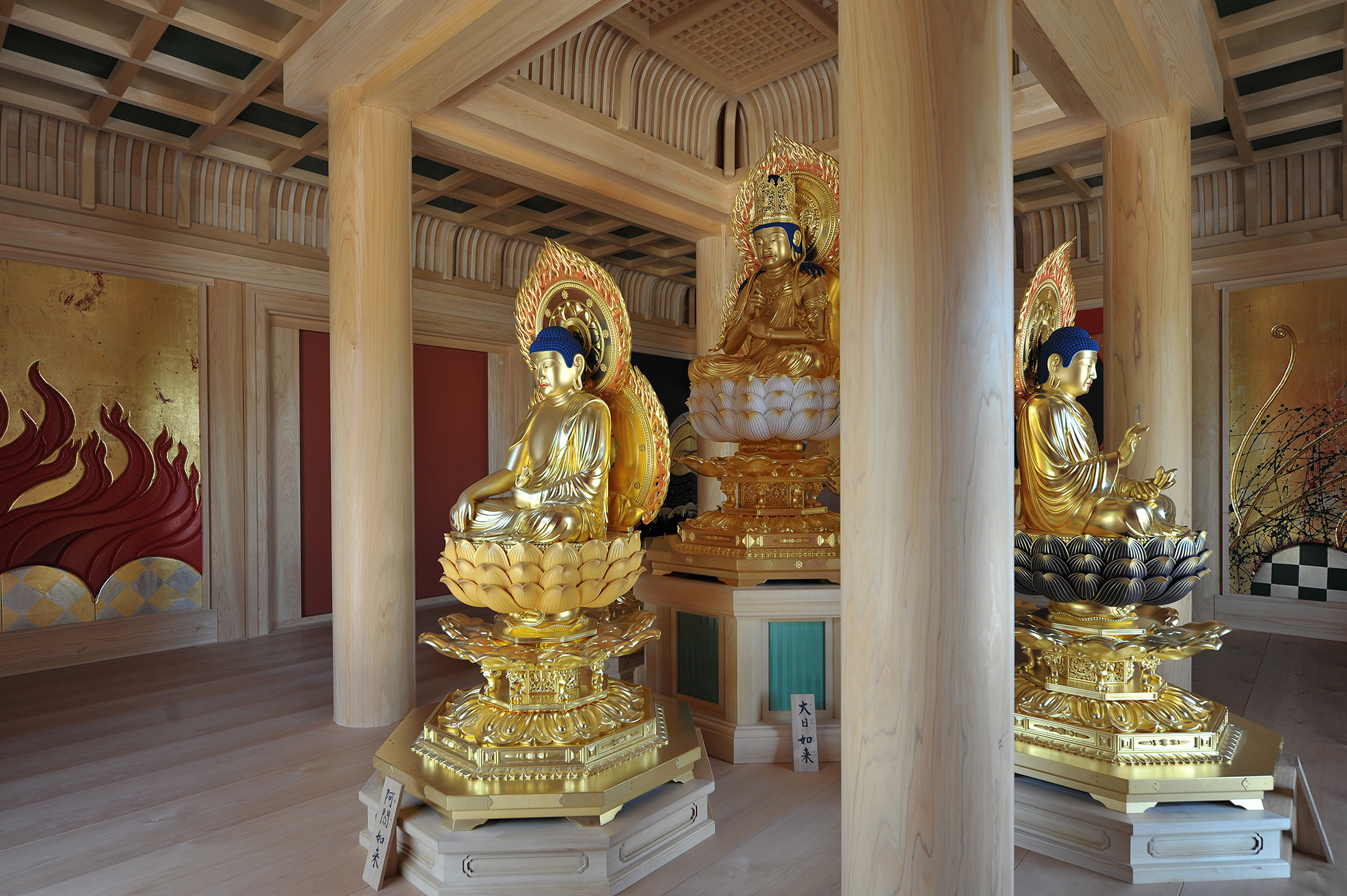
Five Tathāgatas

In the Middle Ages, a temple called Jōkō-ji stood on the site of the present Main Temple of Renge-in Tanjō-ji. The Higo Chronicle written in the Edo period states that Taira no Shigemori ordered the construction of Jōkō-ji along with two five-ring stupas (五輪塔), the Great South Gate, and a nunnery named Myōshō-ji (妙性寺). Since Shigemori, who was the eldest son of Taira no Kiyomori, was born in 1138 and died in 1179, Jōkō-ji seems to have been built during the last decades of the Heian period. However, the statement in the Higo Chronicle cannot be supported by surviving contemporary documents.

The oldest document which mentions Jōkō-ji is the Tōmyō-ji Document written in 1298 in the Kamakura period, in which it is stated that "Jōkō-ji of Higo Province was privately built by Shramana Ekū." Although we cannot determine that the "Jōkō-ji of Higo Province" mentioned there is indeed the Jōkō-ji Renge-in of Taira no Shigemori mentioned in the Higo Chronicle or that the former succeeded the latter, it is safe to assume that Jōkō-ji was built either at the end of the Heian period or the beginning of the Kamakura period.

An excavation in the 1960s at the site of the present Main Hall revealed several Buddhist instruments from the Kamakura period. Therefore, it is conjectured that the Main Hall of Jōkō-ji also once stood there or near the site. These objects, designated Municipal Cultural Properties of Tamana in 2008, are on exhibit at Renge-in Tanjō-ji.

According to the old documents of Saidai-ji from the Kamakura period and the Muromachi period, it is unquestionable that Jōkō-ji continued to exist from 1290 at least up to 1478. Since the temple no longer existed in the Edo period, it seems reasonable to suppose that it was destroyed during the wars of the Sengoku period. However, no document thus far has been discovered to corroborate this conjecture.

=== Restoration to Present ===
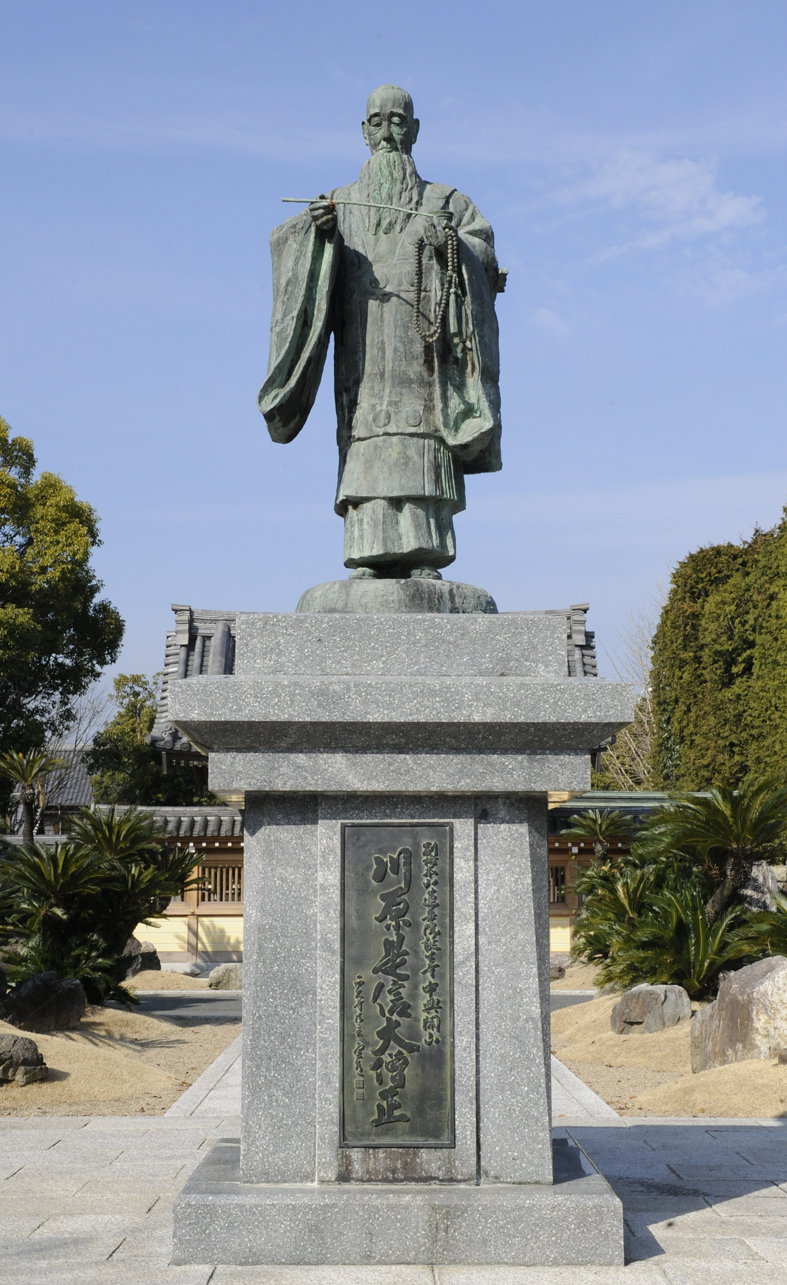
Bronze statue of Zeshin Kawahara

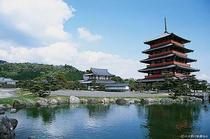
Oku-no-in

In the first years of the Shōwa period, there were only a few houses, fields, and little woods scattered around on the former site of Jōkō-ji. These woods were believed by the locals to be haunted by a wrathful spirit, and, in 1929, Zeshin Kawahara, a psychic from the neighboring city of Arao, was sought out for his psychic abilities to appease the spirit.

In the early morning of December 10, while reciting sutras in a shanty on the former site of Jōkō-ji, he heard a voice telling him, "I am the Acharya Kōen who, 760 years ago from now, was granted a draconic form at Sakuraga Pond in Enshū. Now with my wishes being fulfilled, I grant thee the merit. Rebuild Renge-in for the sake of the salvation of all people." Although Zeshin, who was 34 years old at the time, had never heard either of Kōen or Sakuraga Pond, convinced of the gravity of the spiritual communication, he immediately commenced the restoration of the temple. Aided by the local villagers, a small Main Hall was completed by next March. In the following years, the Acharya Hall, the Dining Hall (食堂), and the Visitors' Center were added. The temple thus restored was named Renge-in Tanjō-ji ("Birth Temple") in honor of Mahābodhisattva Kōen's birthplace on which it stands. The small Main Hall was renovated into the Daigan-dō (大願堂) in 1950, which, in turn, was transformed to the present Main Hall of reinforced concrete in 1966. Thus Zeshin successfully fulfilled Kōen's command; his psychic power as a Mahasiddha was further strengthened over the years due to his innate spiritual abilities and strenuous training, which he applied, under Kōen's protection, for the salvation of the distressed. As the result, the number of devotees gradually increased all over the country.

Upon Zeshin's passing in 1977, Shin-nyo Kawahara took over as abbot. November 3, 1978, saw the Opening Celebration of the Oku-no-in on Mt. Shōdai, which had been under construction at the wish of the former abbot, making Renge-in more accessible not only to the devotees but also to all visitors. As a practitioner of Fuse-gyō (布施行, Almsgiving Practice), he started to support Cambodian refugees. Based on this experience, he founded the nonprofit organization Association for Renge-in Tanjō-ji International Cooperation (ARTIC for short), devoted to providing the needy all around the globe with humanitarian aids. He also founded the Committee for Raising Parent-caring Children, and advocated and encouraged a closer relationship between the parent and the child by inviting elementary and middle school students all over Japan to submit poems on their mothers. The Naikan Institute, where domestic as well as international visitors can practice Naikan (guiding in English is available), was also established during his abbotship.

Eishō Kawahara succeeded Shin-nyo in 1992 and became the abbot as the Third Restorer. Through the ARTIC, he has expanded the temple's humanitarian activities in more various countries such as Sri Lanka, Tibet, and Myanmar. Domestically, he sent teams of volunteers during the Great Hanshin earthquake of 1995 and the Great East Japan earthquake of 2011. The 14th Dalai Lama was invited in 2005 to perform the World Peace Homa Ceremony at the Main Temple and to give a lecture at the Oku-no-in. The wooden Five-story Pagoda was completed in 1997 and the Great South Gate in 2011, both using traditional architectural techniques. The Awakening Rite for the statues of the Four Heavenly Kings, works by the Busshi Tsukumo Imamura housed in the Great South Gate, was performed simultaneously with the Opening Ceremony for the Gate.

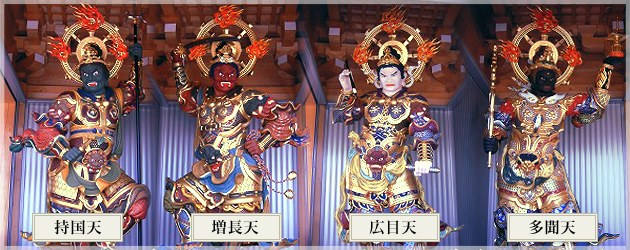
The Four Heavenly Kings of the Great South Gate: from left to right, Dhṛtarāṣṭra (Jikoku-ten), Virūḍhaka (Zōjō-ten), Virūpākṣa (Kōmoku-ten), and Vaiśravaṇa (Tamon-ten)
