= Ryokan (disambiguation) =

A ryokan is a type of traditional Japanese inn usually providing meals as part of the stay.

Ryokan or Ryōkan may also refer to:

- Ryōkan (1758–1831), a Zen Buddhist monk and poet who lived in Japan
- Ninshō, often referred to as Ninshō Ryōkan (1217–1303), the first chief priest of Gokurakuji and a disciple of Eison (1201–1290)
- Ryokan Kurosawa, a character in the Fatal Frame video game
