= Hannya-ji =

Buddhist temple in Nara, Nara, Japan

- 般若寺
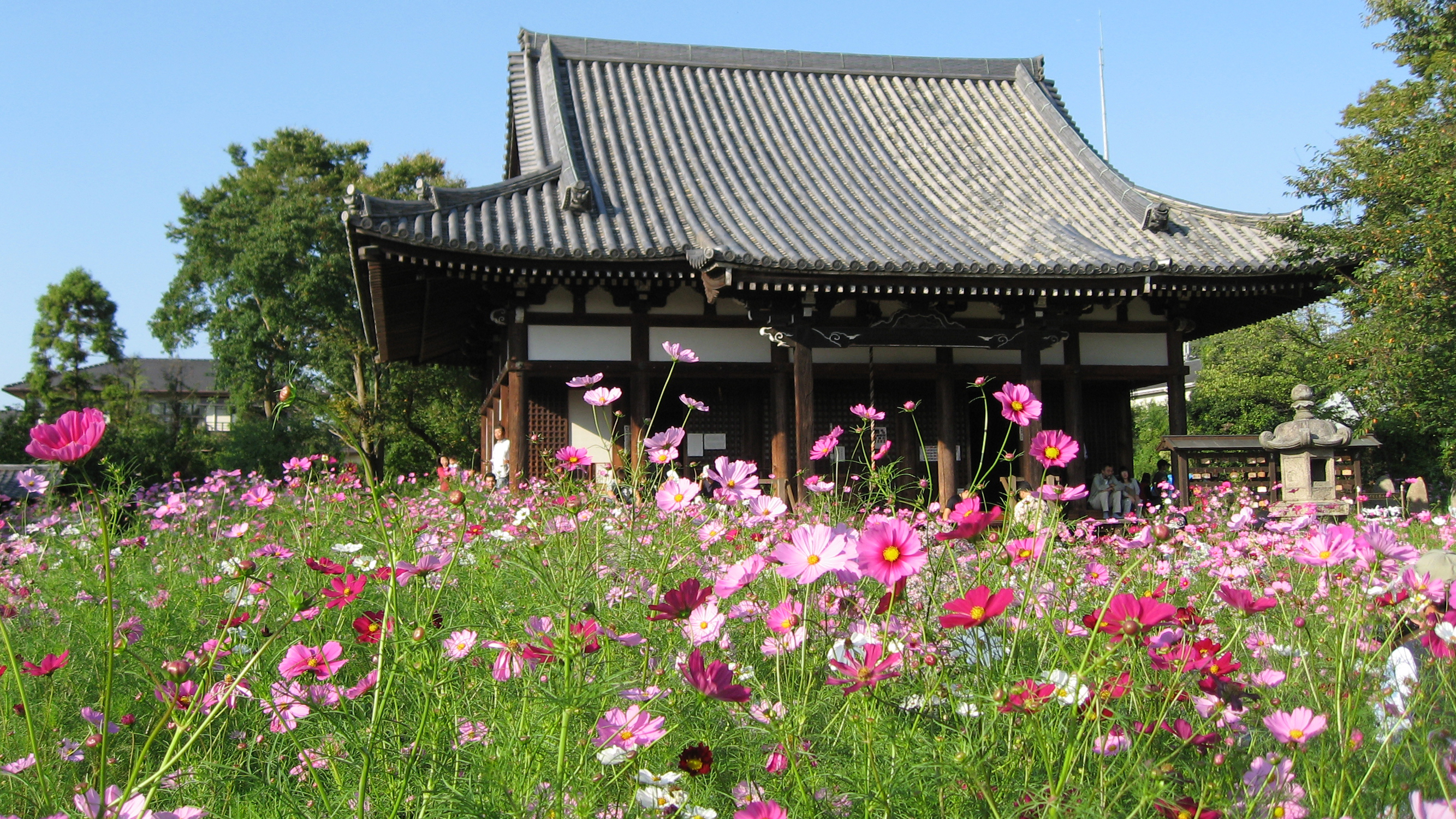
- Hannya-ji Hondō

- Location within Nara Prefecture Location within Japan

Religion
- Affiliation: Buddhist
- Deity: Monju Bosatsu.
- Rite: Shingon Ritsu
- Status: functional

Location
- Location: 221 Hannyaji-cho, Nara-shi, Nara-ken
- Coordinates: 34°42′0.22″N 135°50′10.38″E

Architecture
- Founder: c. Hye-gwan
- Completed: c.Nara period
- National Treasure National Important Cultural Property

Hannya-ji (般若寺) is a Buddhist temple located in the city of Nara, Nara Prefecture Japan. It belongs to the Shingon Ritsu sect of Japanese Buddhism and its honzon is a statue of Monju Bosatsu.The temple's full name is Hōshōzan Hannya-Ritsu-ji (法性山般若律寺). It is also commonly known as the "Cosmos temple" after the thousands of cosmos flowers that bloom in late summer and early autumn.

== Location ==
Hannya-ji is located at the top of a slope called Narazaka on the road running north–south connecting Yamato Province with Yamashiro Province. Known as the "Kyō-kaidō" (or "Nara-kaidō" or "Yamato-kaidō" from the Kyoto side), it was an important route connecting since ancient times. This road is also an extension of the Higashi-shichibo-ōji which ran north–south along the eastern edge of Heijō-kyō (forming the boundary between Tōdai-ji and Kōfuku-ji temples.

== History ==
There are no records in official historical documentation regarding the circumstances or timing of the temple's founding. Physical evidence, in the form of roof tiles from the Nara period have been unearthed from the temple grounds, confirming that a temple existed in this area since that time. According to temple tradition, it was founded in 629 AD (the first year of Emperor Jomei's reign) by the Goguryeo monk Hye-gwan. The temple legend further states that in 735 Emperor Shōmu expanded the temple complex to protect the unlucky northeast direction of Heijō-kyō, and also built a thirteen-story stone pagoda to house the 600-volumes of the Large Prajñāpāramitā Sūtras, handwritten by the emperor, which is the origin of the temple's name. There is no historical documentation to support these claims.

Another tradition (from the Jogu Shōtoku Hō-ō Teisetsu) states that the temple was founded in 654 AD by Soga no Hyūga for the recovery of Emperor Kōtoku from illness.

The situation is further complicated by an inscription dated 1267 stating that "Hannya-ji was founded by Emperor Shōmu and restored in the Heian period by the monk Kanken." However, the "Hannya-ji " that Kanken (854-925) was involved with was a temple located in Yamashiro Province (present-day Narutaki Hannya-ji-chō, Ukyō-ku, Kyoto, and this theory confuses Hannya-ji with a different temple with the same name. That this inscription is incorrect was already noted in the Edo period.

The first appearance of "Hannya-ji " in reliable historical sources is believed to be in the "Kinkōmyōji Sutra Copying Office Document" (located in the Shōsōin) dated October 3, 14th year of Tenpyō (742). However, even this is disputed, as the temples this refers to may have been Kataoka-dera (also known as “Hannya-ji”), which was located in what is now Kashiba, Nara (there is also a theory that Hannya-in in the same city was a temple that succeeded Kataoka-dera as a nunnery. If these examples are all excluded, the first mention would be "Hannya-dera in Soekami District," which appears in the entry for September 26, 863, in the Nihon Sandai Jitsuroku.

The history of the temple until the end of the Heian period is not very clear, but it appears to have flourished as a seminary temple, attracting a thousand monks. However, during the Battle of Nara in 1180, the temple, along with Tōdai-ji and Kōfuku-ji was burned down by Taira no Shigehira, and it remained in near-ruins for some decades afterward. Later Shigehira's head was nailed in front of the Hannya-ji torii, since this is where he had stood when the temples burned.

Reconstruction efforts were undertaken during the Kamakura period. The thirteen-story stone pagoda, a symbol of the temple, was re-erected by the monk Ryōe and others around 1253. Afterwards, the main image and temple buildings were restored by Eison of Saidai-ji. The priest Eison was the founder of the Shingon Ritsu sect, with Saidai-ji as its head temple, and is known for his efforts to restore the precepts in Japanese Buddhism and for carrying out social work such as providing relief for the poor and sick. The area north of Nara where the temple is located was inhabited during this time by the sick and poor, who were discriminated against and called "hinin"; there was also a facility nearby called "Kitayama Jūhachikendo" (a National Historic Site) that housed people with incurable diseases such as leprosy. Eison began the construction of a new main image of Hannya-ji, a statue of Monju Bosatsu, and the eye-opening ceremony was held in 1267. This statue of Manju was a colossal figure riding on a lion, and it took a full 12 years to complete.

Since this temple sided with the Southern Court during the Nanboku-chō period, a statue of Monju (the current principal image) was created by the emperor's personal monk, Bunkanbō Kōshin, at the request of Emperor Go-Daigo, to pray for the overthrow of the Ashikaga shogunate. The temple was destroyed by fire in 1490, and the principal image of Monju was also lost. The temple burned down again during the Battle of Tōdai-ji in 1567

In 1667, the current main hall (a Nara Prefecture designated Tangible Cultural Property) was rebuilt, and at that time, the statue of Monju that had been in the sutra hall was moved to the main hall and became the new principal image.

The temple suffered extensive damage during the anti-Buddhist movement in the early Meiji period, and its buildings fell into disrepair and became uninhabited. However, after World War II, the various buildings were repaired and the temple grounds were restored. The guest hall of Hannya-ji was relocated to Shirokanedai, Minato-ku, Tokyo, by businessman Ichisei Hatakeyama (the founder of Ebara Corporation), and after World War II, it operated as a ryōtei called "Hannya-en". It was the setting for Yukio Mishima's novel "After the Banquet." It closed in 2005 and was subsequently demolished.

Hannya-ji is 15th in the Eighty-Eight Sacred Sites of Northern Yamato (大和北部八十八ヶ所霊場), a pilgrimage route of eighty-eight sacred sites located in northern Yamato Province, which was established during the mid-Edo period (Meiwa era, 1764-1772). Some of the temples along the route are now abandoned or uninhabited.

== Gallery ==
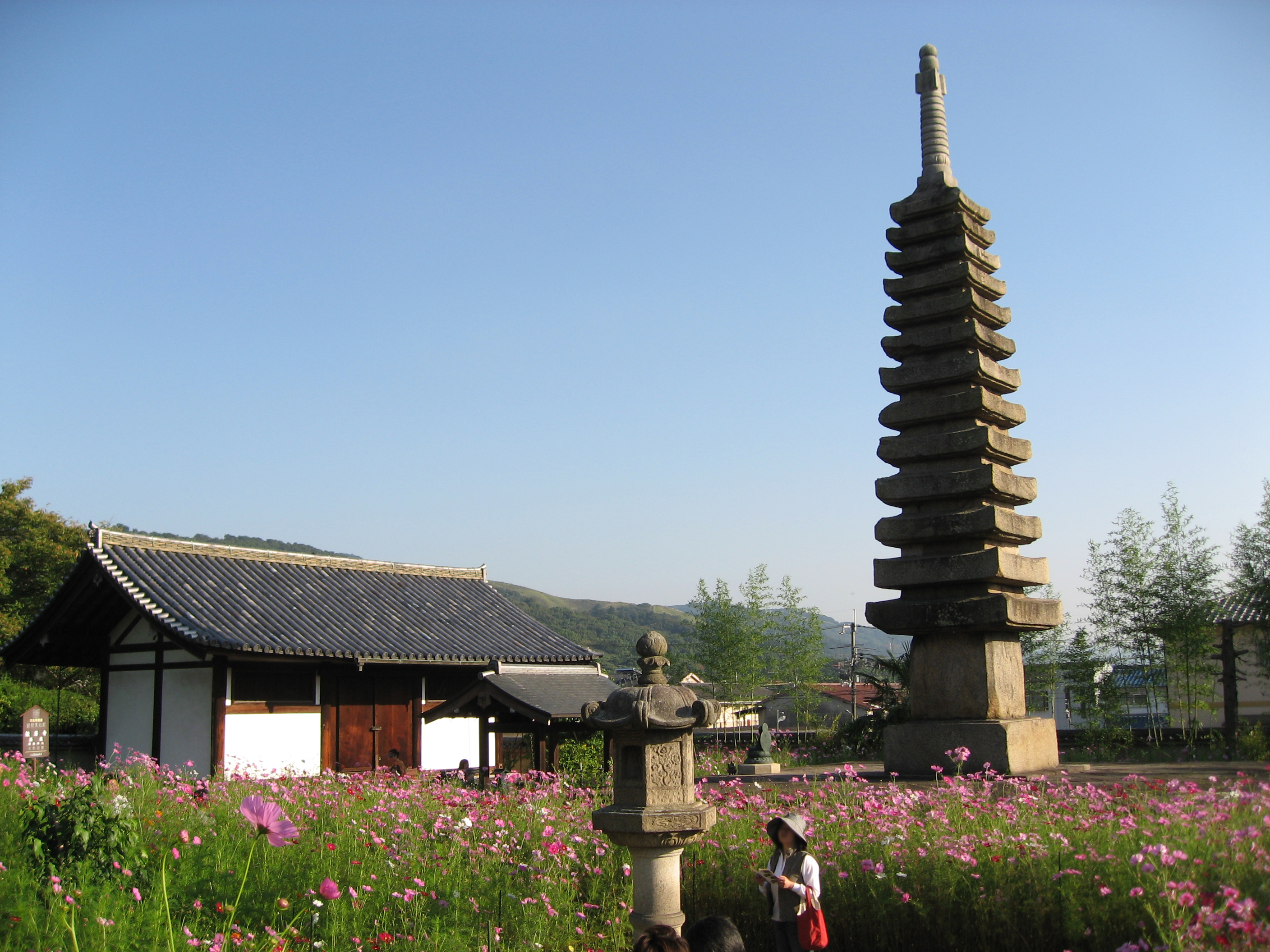
Thirteen-tier stone pagoda (ICP)

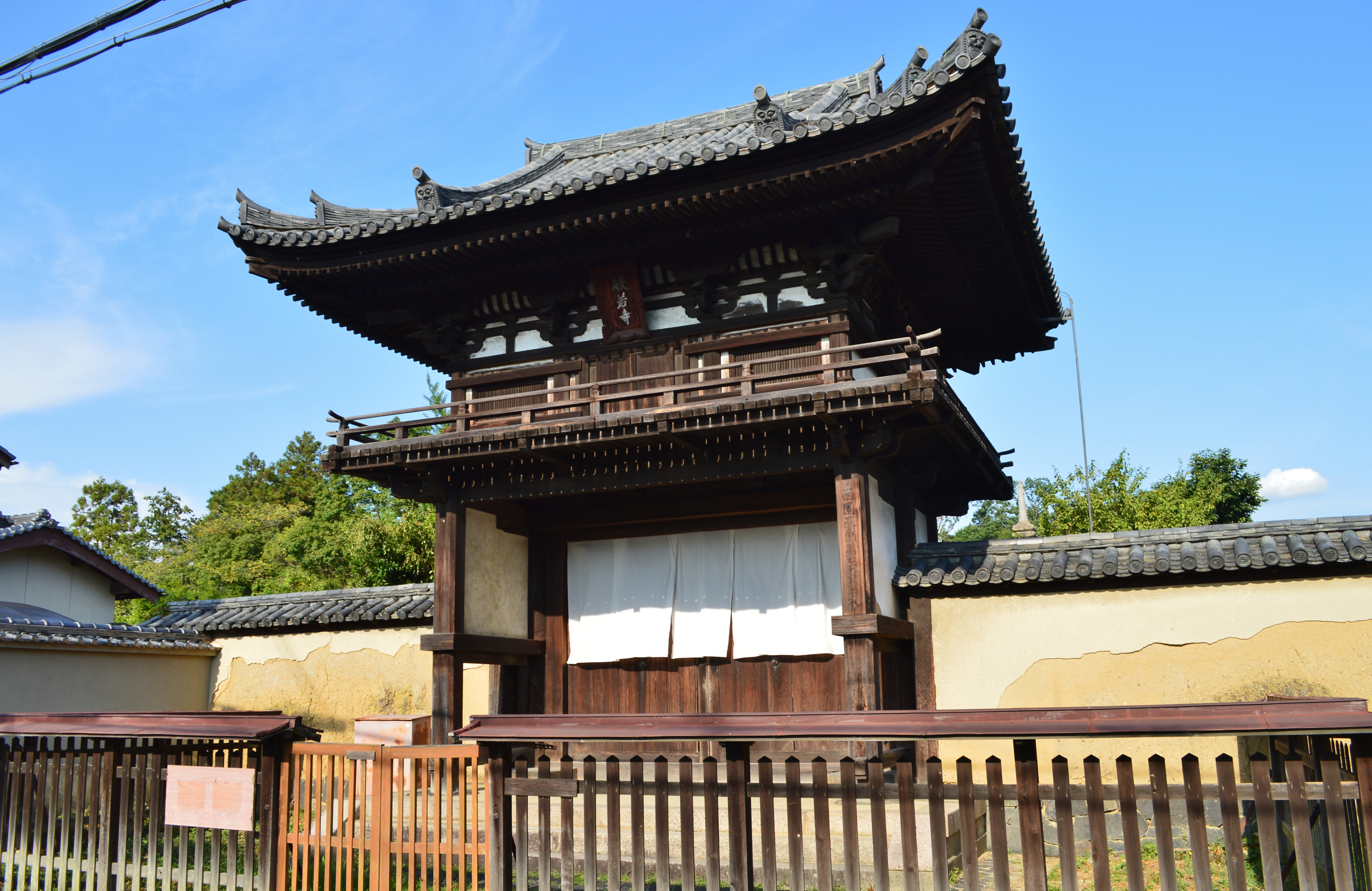
Rōmon (NT)

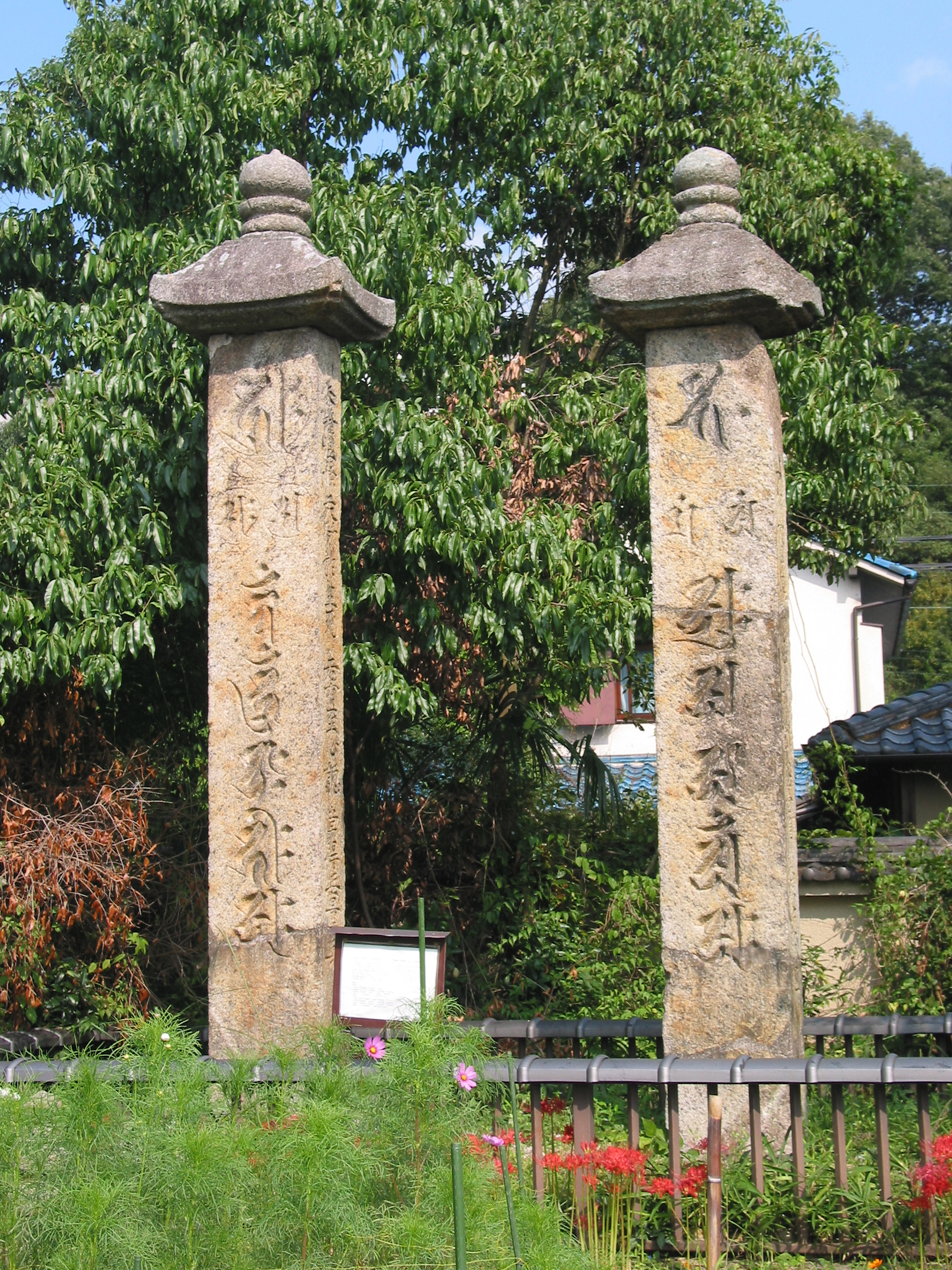
Kasatōba stupas (ICP)

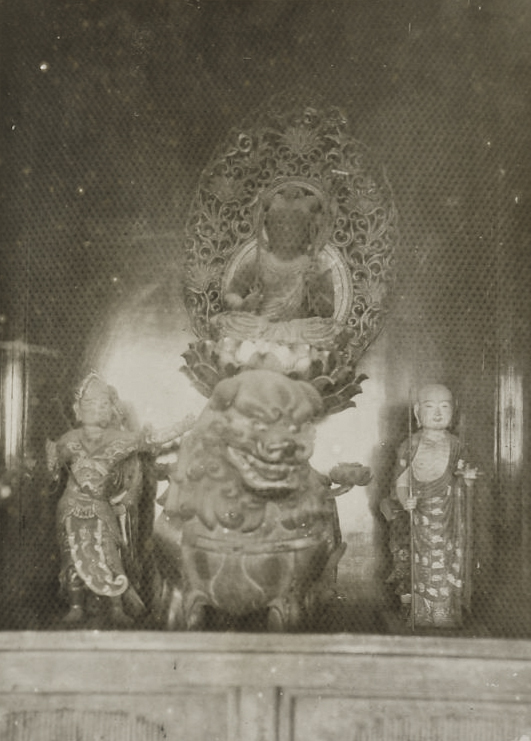
Monju Bosatsu (1324) (ICP)

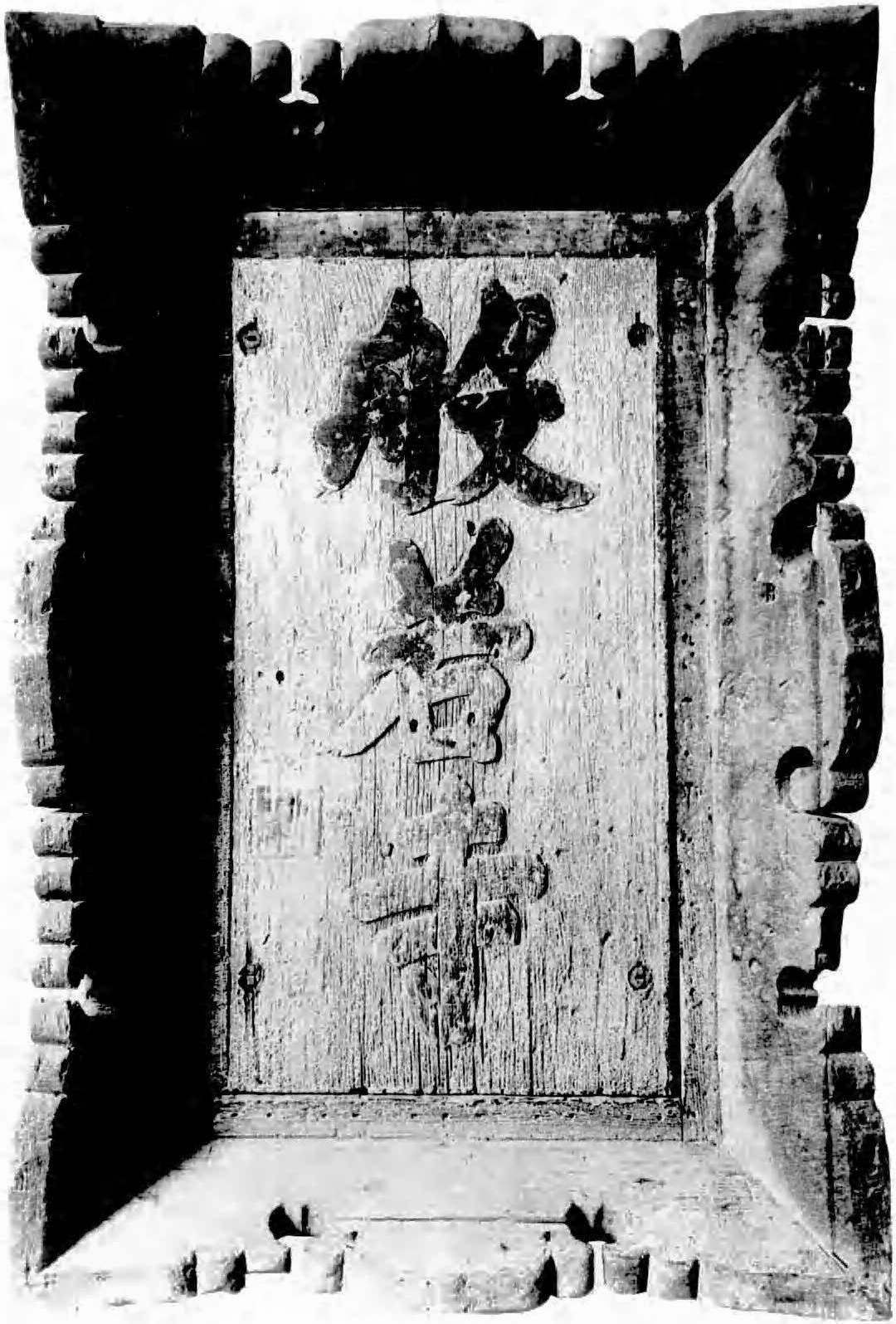
Hengaku plaque (ICP)

== Cultural Properties ==
=== National Treasures ===
- Rōmon (楼門), Kamakura period (1264-1267). This two-story gate tower with a hipped and tiled roof was originally built in 1267 as the west gate of the now vanished corridor. The lower level has one bay, and the upper level has three bays. It makes extensive use of nagashi (horizontal beams) and is based on the Japanese style, but the details of the upper level, such as the brackets, make extensive use of the "Daibutsu-style". The brackets of the upper level appear to be a complex structure when viewed from the outside, but inside the building it is a simple structure in which the columns directly reach the girders (horizontal members that support the roof rafters), and no brackets are used. In other words, the brackets of the upper level are merely for show, fastened from the outside with nails or mortise and tenon, and a building with such a structure is extremely rare. It is the oldest example of a rōmon surviving in Japan and is designated as a National Treasure

=== Important Cultural Properties ===
- Thirteen-tier stone pagoda (十三重石塔), Kamakura period (1253). This stone monument has a height of 12.6 meters. Although claimed to have been established by Emperor Shōmu, the current pagoda was built in 1253 by the stonemasons Igyōmatsu and his son Igyōkichi, who came to Japan from the Southern Song Dynasty, at the behest of the monk Kanryobō Ryōe. The pagoda is adorned with carvings of the four Buddhas of exoteric Buddhism. It underwent dismantling and repair in 1964, during which numerous artifacts were discovered inside, including a Nara period gilded bronze standing statue of Amida Nyorai, which may be a surviving artifact from the original construction by Emperor Shōmu, small Buddha statues, a stupa, and a Song Dynasty edition of the Lotus Sutra. These items were also collectively designated an Important Cultural Property.
- Kyōzō (経蔵, Sutra repository), late Kamakura period. This is a small, gabled building which during modern repair work was found to have not originally been a sutra repository, but a building with an earthen floor. The building's original purpose remains unknown.
- Kasatōba stupas (笠塔婆), set of two, Kamakura period. Erected on the south side of the temple grounds by Igyō-kichi, the son of Igyō-sue, to commemorate his father, during the Muromachi period, they came to be believed to be the tomb of Taira no Shigehira. They were destroyed during the anti-Buddhist movement in the Meiji era, but were relocated to their current location in 1892 .
- Bronze statue of standing Yakushi Nyorai (銅造薬師如来立像) - late Nara to early Heian period. Now kept at the Nara National Museum.
- Wooden Statue of Monju Bosatsu Riding a Lion (木造文殊菩薩騎獅像), Kamakura period (1324). The principal image, enshrined in the main hall. Commissioned and supervised by Bunkanbō Kōshin, the actual creation was done by Kōshun, the master sculptor of Kōfuku-ji, and Kōsei, a junior sculptor. Originally enshrined in the sutra repository.
- Hengaku (Wooden temple gate plaque) (木造寺門扁額) Heian period. Said to be in the calligraphy of Emperor Saga. Now kept at the Nara National Museum.
- Sharitō in a shrine (厨子入舎利塔) Kamakura period. Now kept at the Nara National Museum.
- Paper Ink Written Prayer of Eison (紙本墨書叡尊願文) Kamakura period - Now kept at the Tokyo National Museum.

=== Nara Prefecture Designated Tangible Cultural Properties ===
- Main Hall (本堂) Edo period (1667) - Hip-and-gable style tiled roof.

=== Other (not designated) ===
- Shōrō - Rebuilt in 1694.
- Wooden statues of the Four Heavenly Kings - Housed in the main hall, Muromachi period.
- Wooden statue of seated Fudo Myōō - Housed in the main hall, Edo period.
- Stone Lantern - Stands in front of the main hall. Made in the late Kamakura period.
- Karahitsu (Chinese Chest) - A sutra box containing the Great Prajnaparamita Sutra from the Kamakura period. It is said that Prince Moriyoshi of the Southern Court hid in it and escaped harm when he fled from Kasagi to Yoshino.

== See also ==
- List of National Treasures of Japan (temples)
