= Saidai-ji =

Buddhist temple in Nara, Japan

- 西大寺
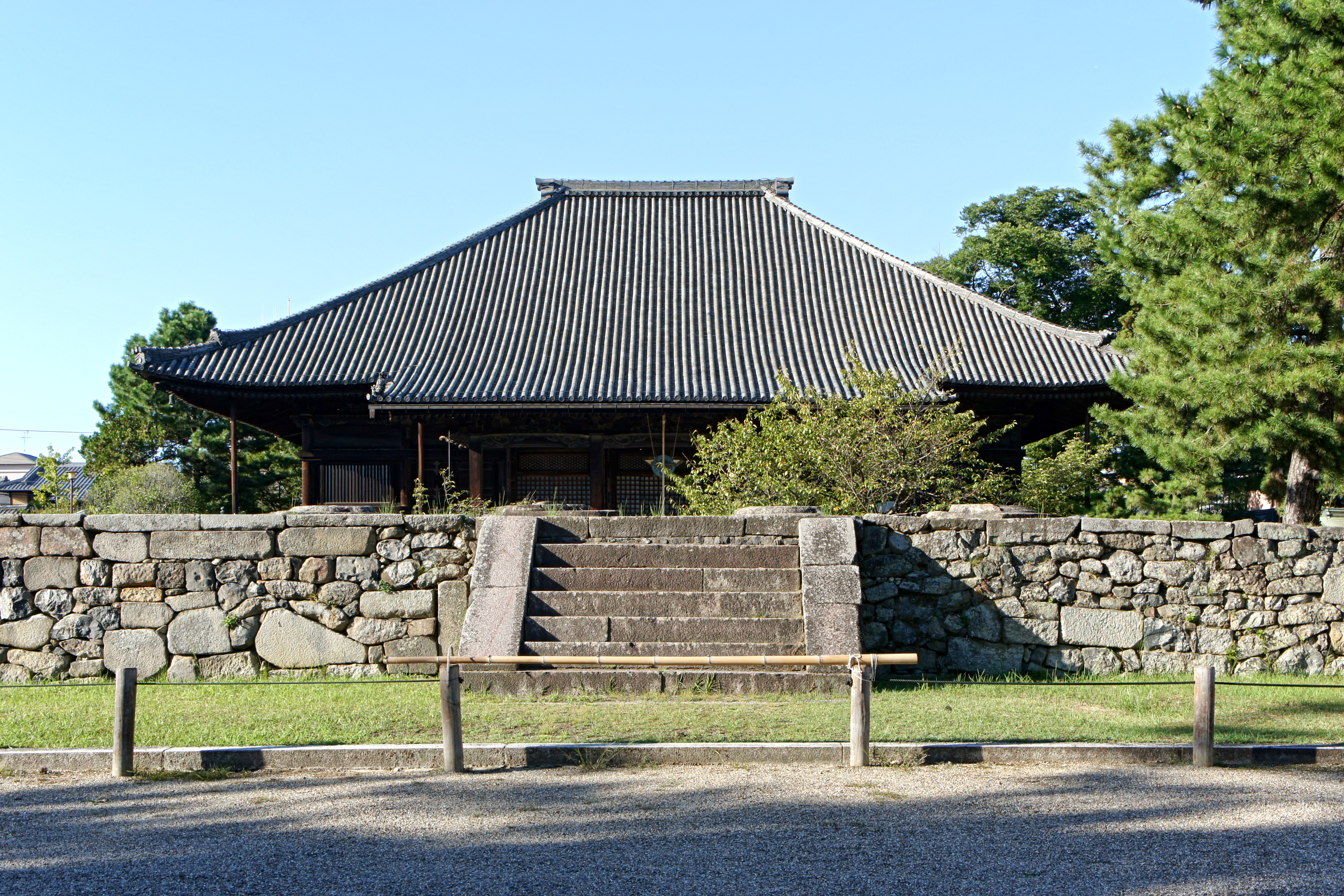
- Main Hall

- Saidai-ji Saidai-ji (Japan)

Religion
- Affiliation: Buddhist
- Deity: Shaka Nyorai (Śākyamuni) (Important Cultural Property)
- Rite: Shingon Ritsu
- Status: Head Temple

Location
- Location: 1-1-5 Saidaiji Shibachō, Nara-shi, Nara-ken
- Country: Japan
- Coordinates: 34°41′37″N 135°46′46.2″E

Architecture
- Founder: Jōtō and Empress Kōken
- Established: 765
- Completed: 1808 (Reconstruction)

Website
- saidaiji.or.jp
- National Historic Site of Japan }

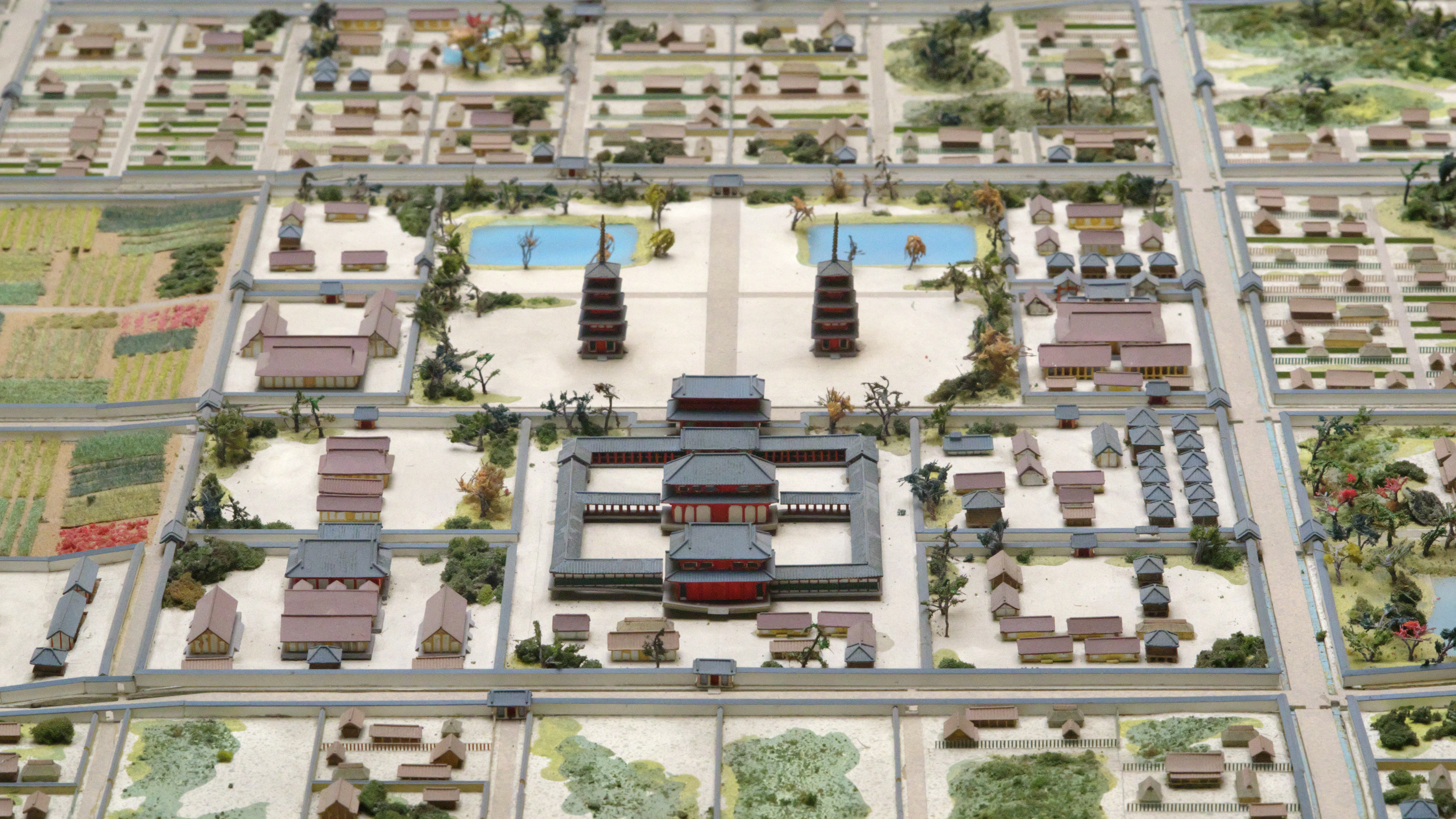
Model of Nara period Saidai-ji

Saidai-ji (西大寺) is a Buddhist temple located in the Saidaiji-Shiba neighborhood of the city of Nara, Nara Prefecture, Japan. It became the head temple of the Shingon Risshu (真言律宗) sect after the sect's founder, Eison (叡尊), took over administration in 1238. The honzon of the temple is a statue of Shaka Nyorai, enshrined by Eison in 1249. The temple was once one of the powerful Seven Great Temples of the ancient capital of Heijō-kyō.

== History ==
According to the Saidaiji Zaizairyukicho (西大寺資財流記帳) from 780, in September 764 the retired Empress Koken requested the construction of a gilt bronze statue of the Four Heavenly Kings to pray for the end of the Fujiwara no Nakamaro Rebellion. In October of the same year, Empress Koken re-enthroned as Empress Shōtoku. The following year, in 765, the aforementioned statues of the Four Heavenly Kings were completed and Saidai-ji Temple was founded. These four statues are still enshrined in Saidai-ji's Shiōdō Hall, but only the demons that each statue steps on are from the time of the temple's founding, and the statues themselves have been replaced by later works. At the time of Saidai-ji's founding, the monk Dōkyō held great influence in the political world, and it is believed that Dōkyō's ideological influence was also great in the construction of Saidai-ji Temple. The temple's name of "Saidai-ji" is a counterpoint to the great national temple of Tōdai-ji and thus a challenge to the existing political and religious power structure.

The temple in its initial form was a huge complex and was counted as one of the Seven Great Temples of Nara. It has two Main Halls: the Yakushi Kondō and the Miroku Kondō, numerous smaller halls (including the Shio-do, Juichimen-do), and twin five-story pagodas on the east and west. According to the "Zaizairyuki-cho", these halls housed many Buddhist statues and were decorated with many mirrors. In the Miroku Kondō alone, a total of 77 Buddhist statues were placed, and the Yakushi Kondō housed 21 statues. However, the temple fell quickly into decline during the Heian period, and many of its halls and pagodas were lost to fires and typhoons, and it came under the control of Kofuku-ji.

The temple was restored in the Kamakura period by the monk Eison. He began the restoration in 1238 and over a 50 year period worked to transform the temple into a center for social welfare work, especially to help the poor and sick. Many of the Buddhist statues and crafts that remain at the temple today were created during the time of Eison. The temple also produced many noteworthy priests, such as Ninsho, who worked to restore ruined temples of various provinces, including several of the kokubunji temples. In the Muromachi period, the temple was burned down in December 1499 during the wars of the early Sengoku period, and its surviving East Pagoda was destroyed by a fire in 1502. During the Edo period, the temple received a fief of 300 koku from the Tokugawa shogunate and began reconstruction. All of the current temple buildings were rebuilt after the Edo Period.

Saidai-ji became independent from the Shingon sect in June 1895, and established the Shingon Ritsu sect. The temple houses numerous National Treasures and Important Cultural Properties.

The precincts of Saidai-ji were designated a National Historic Site in 1965.

== Building list ==
- Main Hall (Hondō – 本堂) – Important Cultural Property. It was rebuilt in 1808.
- Shiō-dō (四王堂) – It was rebuilt in 1674.
- Aizen-dō (愛染堂) – It was reconstructed in 1762.
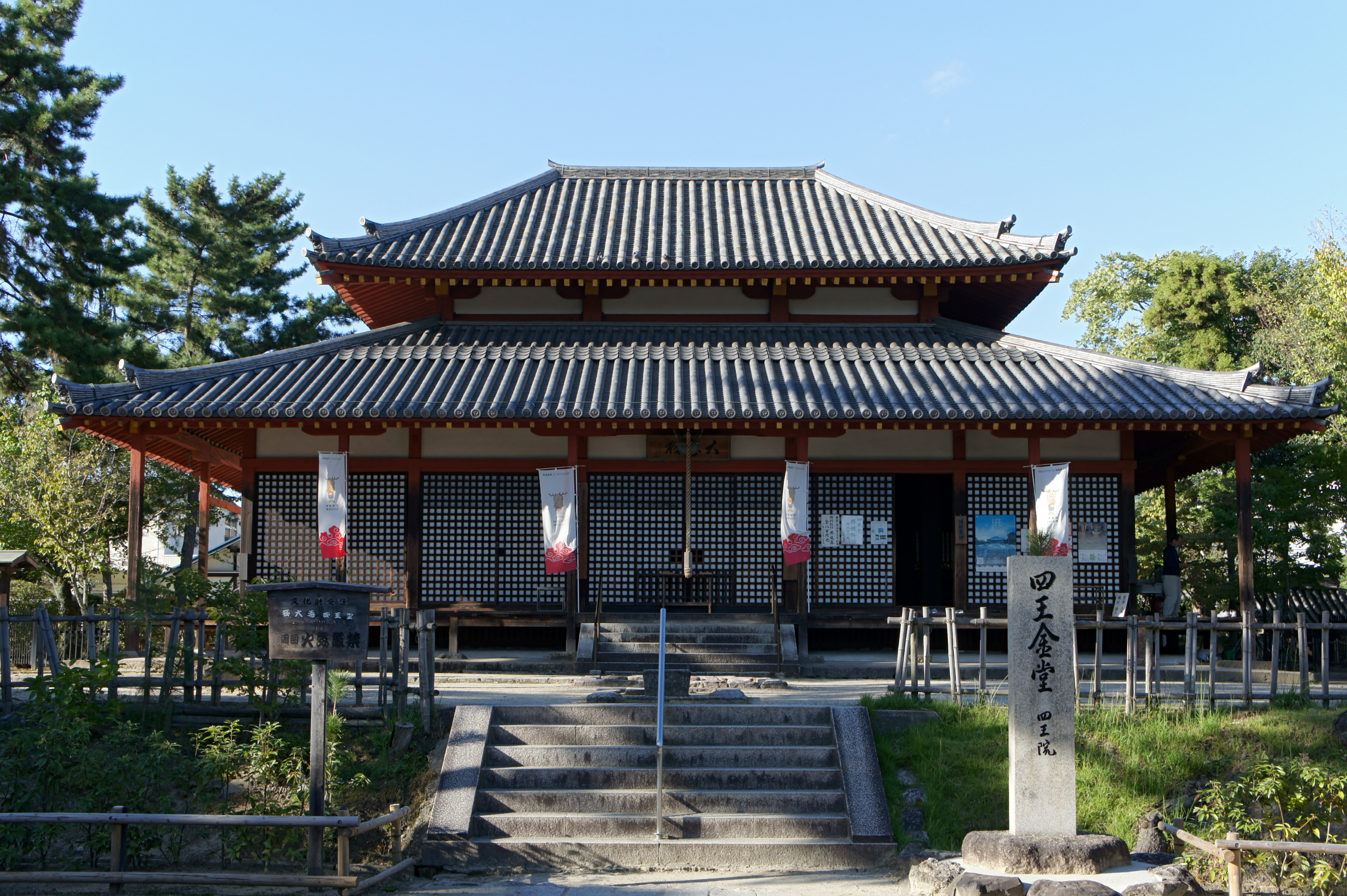
Shiō-dō

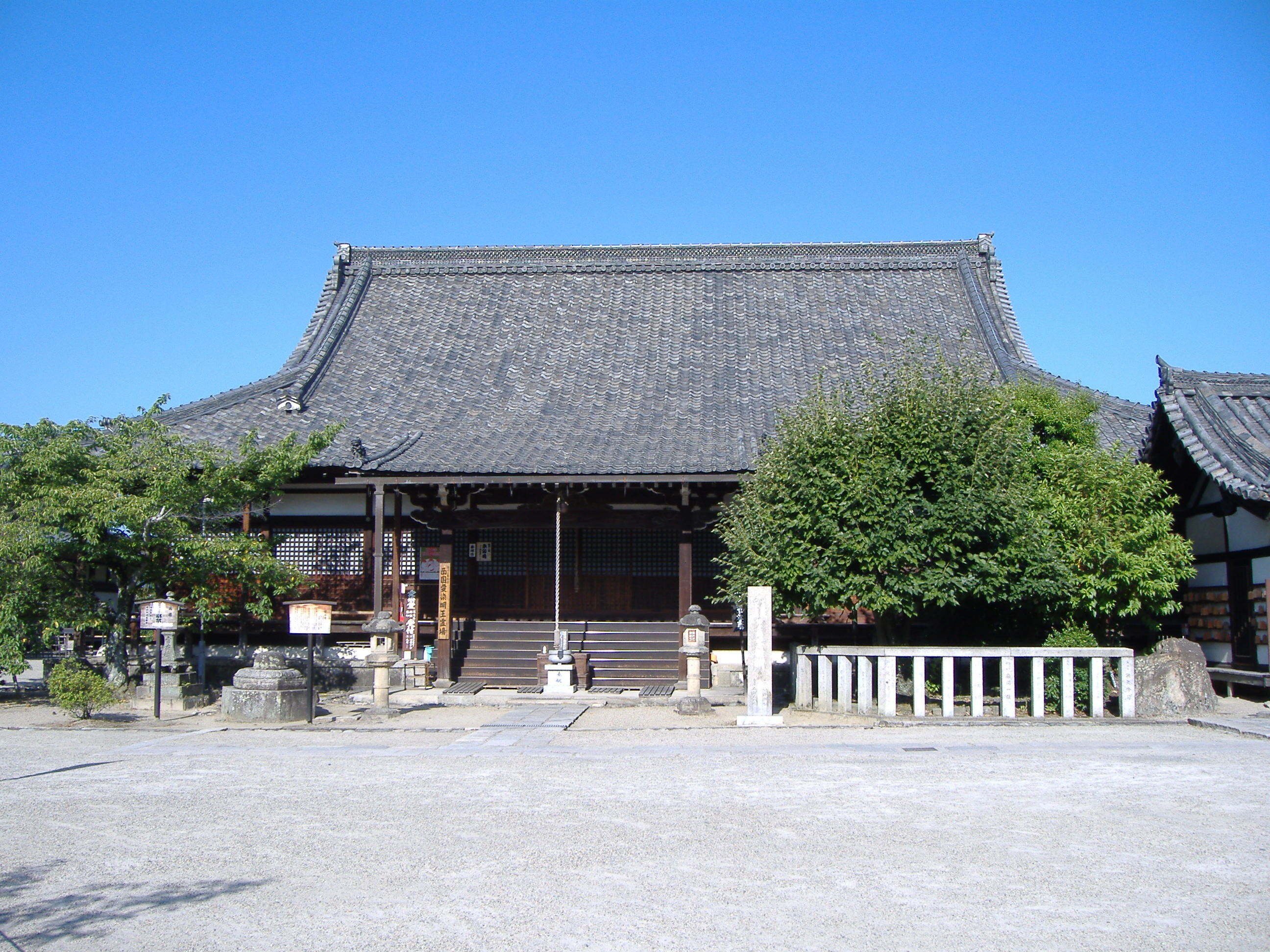
Aizen-dō

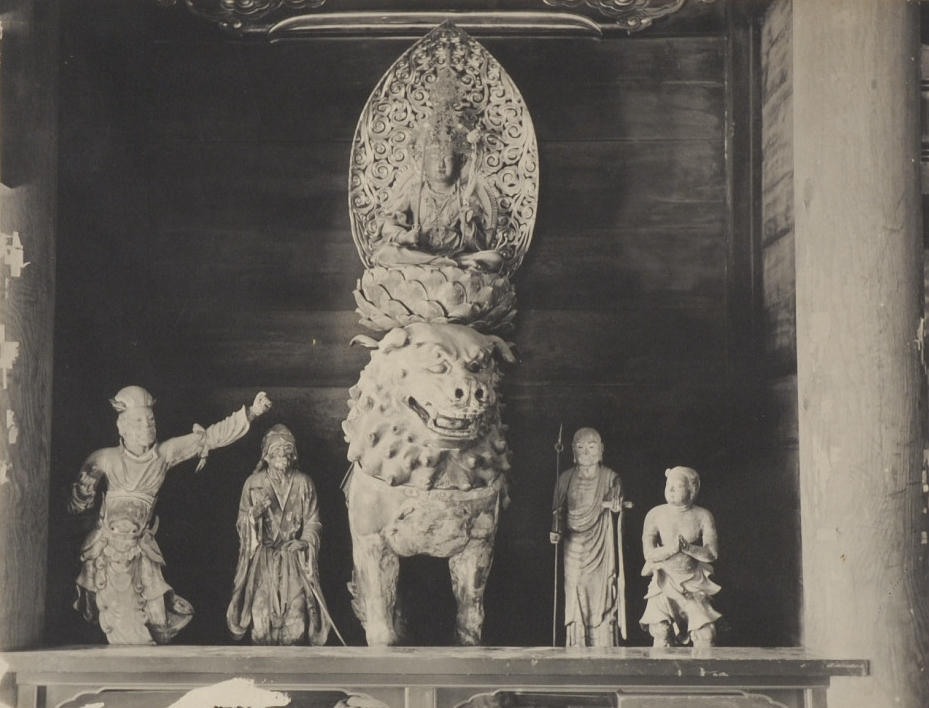
Manjushri Bodhisattva (Monju Bosatsu)

== See also ==
- List of National Treasures of Japan (crafts-others)
- List of National Treasures of Japan (paintings)
- List of National Treasures of Japan (sculptures)
- List of National Treasures of Japan (writings)
- Nanto Shichi Daiji, Seven Great Temples of Nanto.
- Thirteen Buddhist Sites of Yamato
- List of Historic Sites of Japan (Nara)
