= Shingon Risshu =

Sect of Japanese Buddhism

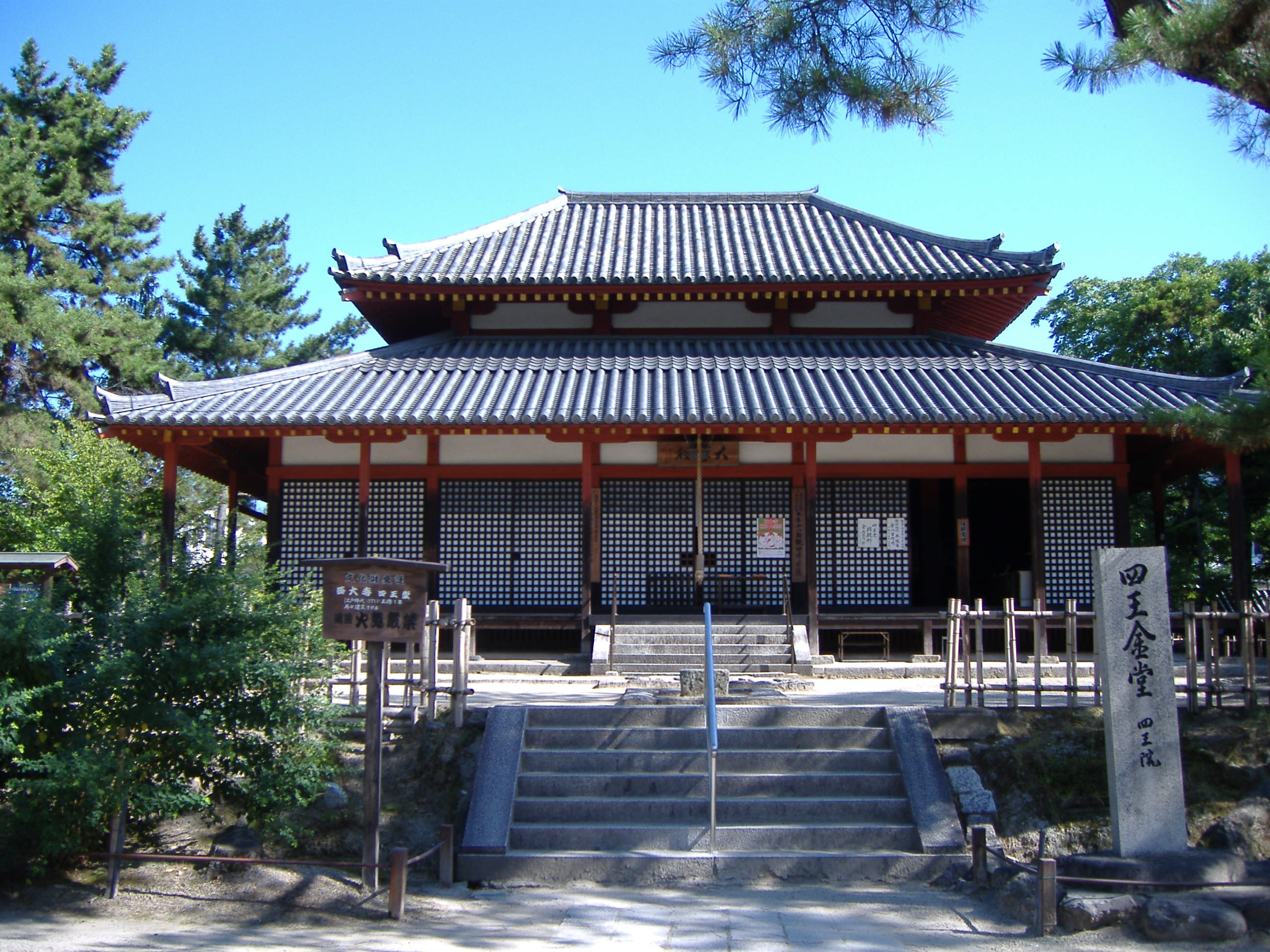
Saidai-ji, Shingon-Risshu head temple

Shingon Risshū (真言律宗; "Shingon-Vinaya School") is a sect of Japanese Buddhism that integrates the pratimoksha rules, the ordination precepts of Early Buddhism, and the samaya rules of Vajrayana, all grounded in Shingon Buddhism's esoteric doctrine. It is noted for reviving the spirit of the Risshū sect, one of the Six Schools of Nara Buddhism (南都六宗).

The sect emphasizes adherence to the vinaya—the Buddhist monastic discipline—more than traditional Shingon Buddhism, while retaining tantric practices. Its home temple is Saidai-ji in Nara City.

== Founder ==
The sect was founded in the 13th century by the monk Eison (叡尊; also known as Kosho Bosatsu), a disciple of Jōkei. Eison held Kūkai (the founder of Shingon Buddhism) in high reverence and established a synthesis between the Shingon and Risshu traditions. His efforts were continued by his eminent disciple Ninshō (忍性; also called Ninsei).

== History ==
=== Kamakura Period ===
Reacting to the decline in monastic discipline, Eison and Ritsu monk Kakumori began personally administering the ordination precepts, bypassing the imperial state's monopoly on ordination procedures (自誓受戒, jisei-jukai). Eventually, Eison and Kakumori parted ways due to differing interpretations of the precepts.

Eison proceeded to rebuild major temples including Saidai-ji, Kairyuo-ji, Hokke-ji, and Hannya-ji, reestablishing strict vinaya observance independently from the Imperial Court.

His disciple Ninshō expanded the reach of the movement by founding Gokuraku-ji in Kamakura and engaging in active lay outreach. This marked the birth of the Shingon Risshū, which was initially seen as a reform within Shingon and Ritsu traditions, later recognized as a new school within what is now termed "Kamakura Buddhism".

Eison's successors, such as Shinku and Shinsei, earned the trust of the court and helped expand the sect by restoring Kokubun-ji (provincial temples) and converting them into branch temples. At one time, the Ritsu sect (including Shingon Ritsu) rivaled the Zen and Jōdo sects in influence. However, Nichiren criticized it as a "Ritsu national pirate" (律国賊).

Eison and Shinsei also engaged in extensive social welfare work, aiding the poor, the sick, and especially leprosy patients. Tens of thousands were reportedly helped. The defeat of the Mongol invasions of Japan was partly attributed to the protective incantations performed by Eison and Ninshō.

=== After Muromachi ===
The sect declined temporarily during the late Muromachi period, but it was revived in the early Edo period by Meinin. His student Jōgen was the first to use the name "Shingon Ritsu-shū" publicly.

In 1872 (Meiji 5), the Meiji government reorganized Buddhist schools, merging all Ritsu sects into the Shingon sect, citing Shingon Risshū's Shingon lineage. However, independence movements arose within Ritsu temples.

Led by the 64th Elder Saeki Kōsō, Saidai-ji spearheaded the push for autonomy. In 1895 (Meiji 28), the Ritsu sects regained independence, and Shingon Risshū was reestablished as a separate sect. Some temples remained within Shingon, however.

Since then, Saidai-ji has served as the head temple of the Shingon Risshū, and its chief priest customarily serves as the sect's chief abbot.

== Elders of Saidaiji ==
1. Kosho Bodhisattva Eison
2. Jishin Wajo Shinku
3. Senyu
4. Shizun
5. Kengen
6. Choshin
7. Shinsho
8. Genyo
9. Shintan
10. Seisan
11. Kakunjo
12. Teiyu
13. Shinzon
14. Gyoki
15. Teisen
16. Zenyo
17. Jicho
18. Shinsen
19. Ryoyo
20. Kozan
21. Ekuu
22. Einyu
23. Eigen
24. Genku
25. Eishu
26. Kohai
27. Ryosei
28. Genshou
29. Kousan
30. Sen'e
31. Shunyo
32. Ryokei
33. Sonkai
34. Takachu
35. Takamori
36. Genkai
37. Takami
38. Kojun
39. Kaju
40. Sonju
41. Kōkō
42. Sonkei
43. Gokai
44. Kōshū
45. Takahisa
46. Kosen
47. Sonchi
48. Kōki
49. Kenyu
50. Kōen
51. Sonshin
52. Kōsan
53. Songaku
54. Son'ei
55. Kankei
56. Kōyu
57. Sonsei
58. Sondō
59. Sonin
60. Keihan
61. Eido
62. Son'e
63. Sonkai
64. Kohan
65. Saeki Hirochō
66. Fukugaki Shin’ō
67. Saeki Goryū
68. Komaoka Jōen
69. Toshiaki Segi
70. Matsumoto Jitsudō
71. Mitsuaki Taniguchi
72. Jitsuen Ōya
73. Taka Matsumura

== Denominational organization ==
- President
- Director General
- General Affairs Department
- Finance Department
- Department of Teaching and Learning
- Director of Religious Assembly
  - Religious Council Members (10)
  - Chairman
  - Vice Chairman

== Temple ranks ==
- Head Temple – Saidai-ji, Nara City
- Daihonzan – Hōzan-ji, Ikoma City, Nara Prefecture
- Bekkaku Honzan – Ichinomuroin, Gokokuin, Shomyo-ji (Yokohama), Kyōkō-ji (Osaka), Kushokuen (Hirakata), Iyo Kokubun-ji (Imabari), Hokke-ji (Imabari), Renge-in Tanjō-ji (Tamana City, Kumamoto)
- Yugyoji – Gokurakuji Temple (Kamakura), Hoshoin (Uji), Iwafune Temple (Kizugawa), Jōruri-ji (Kizugawa), Kairyuuji Temple (Nara), Fugakuji (Nara), Hannya-ji (Nara), Genkoji (Nara), Kotouin (Nara), Shirahoji Temple (Nara), Nokuan Temple (Yamatokoriyama)
- Other Temples – Chogyumi-ji Temple, Chofukuji, Enshoji Temple (all in Ikoma)

== Educational institutions ==
- Koho Academy
- Tanechiin University (co-managed)
- Rakunan High School and Junior High School (co-managed)
- Shingon Ritsu Institute of Religious Studies
