= Eison =

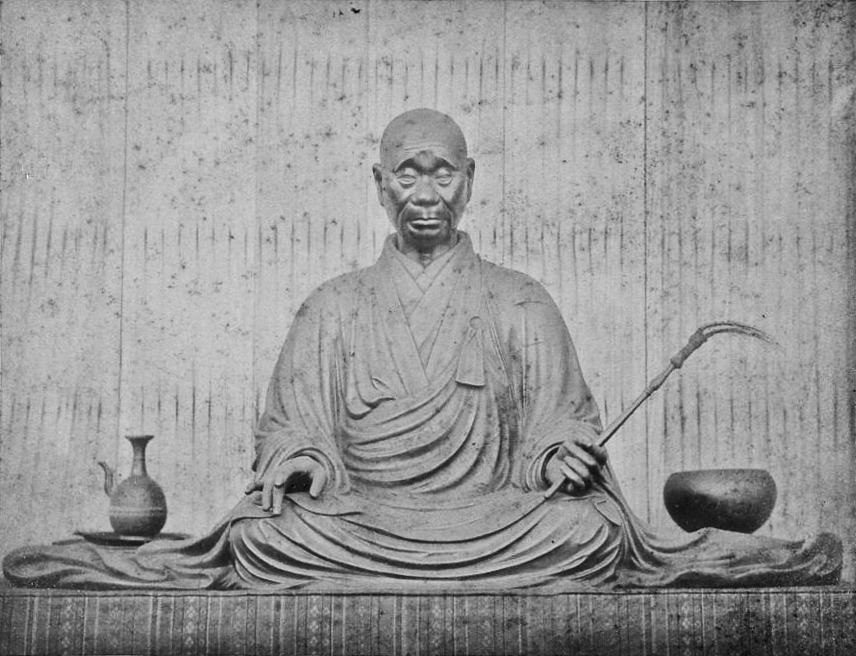
- Wooden seated image of Eison by Zenjun (1280, Saidai-ji, National Treasure)
- Title: Founder of the Shingon Risshū sect

Personal life
- Born: 1201
- Died: September 29, 1290

Religious life
- Religion: Buddhism
- School: Shingon Risshu

Senior posting
- Teacher: Ajari Eken
- Students: Ninshō

Eison (叡尊 (Eison); courtesy name: Shien 思円; posthumous title: Kōshō Bosatsu 興正菩薩; 1201–1290) was a Japanese Buddhist monk active in the mid-Kamakura period. He founded the Shingon Risshu (Shingon Vinaya school). Eison was born in Mikata village, Soejō District, Yamato Province (present-day Yamatokōriyama, Nara), the son of the scholar-monk Keigen of Kōfuku-ji. He is regarded as one of the representative figures of Kamakura Buddhism, known for reviving the neglected Buddhist precepts and restoring the declining Saidai-ji in Nara.

== Biography ==
Eison entered religious training at age eleven, studying initially at Daigo-ji and later at Kongōbu-ji.

- 1217 (Kenpō 5) – Became a disciple of Ajari Eken at Daigo-ji and took ordination.
- 1224 (Gennin 1) – Studied Shingon esoteric teachings at Mount Kōya.
- 1235 (Katei 1) – Vowed to restore the Vinaya and became a ritual monk at the Hōtō-in of Saidai-ji.
- 1236 (Katei 2) – Along with Kakujō, Ensei, and Ugen, performed self-ordination at Tōdai-ji due to the absence of precept masters. (Note: Because no legitimate preceptors remained, they resorted to jisei (self-ordination) as the only way to revive the Vinaya. (Ishida Mizumaro, “On Eison’s Precepts” in *Shōgen, Eison, Ninshō: Collected Essays on Famous Japanese Monks*, Yoshikawa Kōbunkan))
- 1238 (Ryaku'nin 1) – Returned to Saidai-ji, began its restoration, and reestablished ritual boundaries.
- 1240–1246 – Conducted Mañjuśrī services, lectured on the Brahmajāla Sūtra, and administered precepts to laypeople, prisoners, and outcasts.
- 1247 – Commissioned sculptor Zen’en to create an image of Ācala.
- 1249 – Commissioned sculptor Zenkei to carve a Shakyamuni image for Saidai-ji.
- 1254 – Wrote the Shōtoku Taishi kōshiki and initiated annual rites for Prince Shōtoku.
- 1260–1262 – Invited to Kamakura by Hōjō Tokiyori, ordained many, and lectured on the Vinaya. His disciple Shōkai recorded this journey in the Kantō Ōkan-ki.
- 1264 onward – Introduced the Kōmyō Shingon; expanded charitable work.
- 1268–1274 – Oversaw the reconstruction of Hannya-ji, and performed state-protection esoteric rites during the Mongol invasions.
- 1279–1286 – Ordained emperors, aristocrats, and commoners; commissioned his own portrait statue (designated a National Treasure in 2016).
- 1284–1286 – Directed the rebuilding of Uji Bridge, banned killing in the river, and provided alternative work for fishermen.
- 1290 (Shōō 3) – Died at Saidai-ji on September 29, 1290. In 1300, Emperor Fushimi granted him the posthumous title Kōshō Bosatsu.

== Teachings and activities ==
Eison is remembered for reviving monastic precepts in Japan. He promoted devotion to Prince Shōtoku and Mañjuśrī, spread esoteric practices such as the Kōmyō Shingon, and engaged in extensive social work. He aided women, the poor, and those afflicted with leprosy. He was revered by all social classes, from outcasts to the imperial family and the Hōjō clan regents.

At age 60, he traveled to Kamakura, where he conferred precepts widely and reopened the ordination of nuns. Later, he was asked by the imperial court to assume leadership at Shitennō-ji due to his neutrality.

Eison also became associated with the origin of the Ōchamori tea rite, an oversized tea ceremony tradition of Saidai-ji. In 1281, during the Mongol invasion crisis, he conducted rituals invoking Aizen Myōō. Following Japan’s deliverance, he made a tea offering at the Hachiman Shrine using a giant tea bowl to serve the gathered crowds—an act that became the Saidai-ji Ōchamori rite.

While often celebrated for reviving the Vinaya, his true goal was reforming Shingon monasticism. He accepted certain privileges to support his charitable missions, which led to criticism from rivals such as Nichiren, who called him a “Vinaya traitor” (律国賊).

== Legacy ==
Eison transmitted the Dharmaguptaka Vinaya (Shibunritsu), following Ganjin and Kakujō. His disciple Ninshō expanded the movement in eastern Japan with a strong emphasis on charity. At its height, Saidai-ji’s branch temples numbered over 1,500 nationwide.

== Bibliography ==
- Eison; Quinter, David (2007). "Account of the Origin of the Hannyaji Mañjuśrī: A Translation of "Hannyaji Monju Engi"". Monumenta Nipponica. 62 (4): 459–468. doi:10.1353/mni.2007.a230263. JSTOR 25066542.(registration required)
- Eison; Quinter, David (2007). "Votive Text for the Construction of the Hannyaji Mañjuśrī Bodhisattva Statue: A Translation of "Hannyaji Monju Bosatsu Zō Zōryū Ganmon"". Monumenta Nipponica. 62 (4): 469–479. doi:10.1353/mni.2007.a230278. JSTOR 25066543.(registration required)
- Meeks, Lori (2009), "Vows for the Masses: Eison and the Popular Expansion of Precept-Conferral Ceremonies in Premodern Japan", Numen 56 (1), 1–43. JSTOR 27643350

== See also ==
- List of National Treasures of Japan (sculptures)
- Byakugō-ji
- Hannya-ji
- Saidai-ji (Nara)
- Shitennō-ji
- Kamakura Buddhism
