= Ninshō =

Ninshō (忍性; August 19, 1217 – August 25, 1303 (Kengen July 16 – Kempo July 12)) was a Japanese Shingon Risshu priest during the Kamakura period. His was instrumental in reviving Ritsu Buddhism during this period, as well as establishing facilities to care for invalids. He was criticized by his contemporary Nichiren.

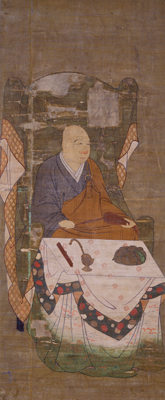
Ninshō in Japan

He is sometimes called Ninshō Ryōkan (忍性良観), or simply Ryōkan (良観), as well. He was a disciple of Eison (1201 – 1290), another Ritsu priest of the period. He was born in Byōbunosato, Shikinoshimonokōri, Yamato Province, now part of Miyake in Nara Prefecture.
