= List of cultural properties of Japan – historical materials (Nara) =

This list is of the cultural properties of Japan designated in the category of historical materials (歴史資料, rekishi shiryō) for the Prefecture of Nara.

== National Cultural Properties ==
As of 1 November 2015, ten Important Cultural Properties have been designated, being of national significance.

Property	Date	Municipality	Ownership	Comments	Image	Coordinates	Ref.
Woodblock for the seventeen-article constitution 十七条憲法板木 jūshichijō kenpō hangi	1285	Ikaruga	Hōryū-ji	one item		34°36′52″N 135°44′03″E	
Woodblocks for the Kasuga edition 春日版板木; Kasuga-ban hangi	Kamakura period	Nara	Kōfuku-ji	2,778 items		34°41′01″N 135°49′57″E	
Woodblocks for the Saidai-ji edition 西大寺版板木; Saidaiji-ban hangi	Kamakura to Edo period	Nara	Saidai-ji	124 items		34°41′37″N 135°46′46″E	
Construction diagrams and drawings of the tools for the Tanzan Jinja honden 談山神社本殿造営図並所用具図〈永禄二年七月／〉 Tanzan Jinja honden zōei-zu narabini shoyōgu-zu (Eiroku ni-nen shichi-gatsu)	1559	Sakurai	Tanzan Jinja	twelve items		34°27′57″N 135°51′42″E	
Cloth for paying taxes 調布 chōfu	Nara period	Ikaruga	Hōryū-ji	two items		34°36′52″N 135°44′03″E	
Instruction diagram for the Tōdai-ji Kaidan-in 東大寺戒壇院指図; Tōdaiji kaidan-in sashizu	Muromachi and Momoyama periods	Nara	Tōdai-ji	one item		34°41′20″N 135°50′23″E	
Map of the provinces of Japan as one continent 南瞻部洲大日本国正統図; Nansen bushū dai-Nihon koku seitō zu	Muromachi period	Nara	Tōshōdai-ji	one item, in the Gyōki-zu tradition		34°40′32″N 135°47′05″E	
Hōryū-ji masu 法隆寺枡; Hōryuji masu	Muromachi and Momoyama periods	Ikaruga	Hōryū-ji	two items		34°36′52″N 135°44′03″E	
Materials relating to Kitaura Sadamasa 北浦定政関係資料; Kitaura Sadamasa kankei shiryō	Edo period	Nara	Nara National Research Institute for Cultural Properties	1,095 items		34°41′30″N 135°47′17″E	
Yakushi-ji masu 薬師寺枡; Yakushiji masu	Muromachi and Momoyama periods	Nara	Yakushi-ji (kept at Nara National Museum)	three items		34°40′59″N 135°50′17″E	

== Prefectural Cultural Properties ==
As of 1 May 2015, seven properties have been designated at a prefectural level.

Property	Date	Municipality	Ownership	Comments	Image	Coordinates	Ref.
List of the branch temples of Saidai-ji in the various provinces 西大寺諸国末寺帳; Saidaiji shokoku matsuji chō	Nanbokuchō to Meiji period	Nara	Saidai-ji	one scroll		34°41′37″N 135°46′46″E	
Document boxes dedicated at the Buddhist halls of Tōshōdai-ji, together with the documents 仏堂納置文書箱及び所納文書、木札; Butsudō nōchi monjo bako oyobi shonō monjo, mokusatsu	Muromachi period	Nara	Tōshōdai-ji	seven items		34°40′32″N 135°47′05″E	
Administrative documents of Nara Prefecture 奈良県行政文書; Nara-ken gyōsei monjo	Meiji and Taishō periods	Nara	Nara Prefecture (kept at the Nara Prefectural Library and Information Centre (奈良県立図書情報館))	6,695 documents		34°40′33″N 135°48′19″E	
Materials relating to the Kōriyama Hakamoto 郡山町箱本関係資料; Kōriyama-chō Hakamoto kankei shiryō	Momoyama and Edo periods	Yamatokōriyama	Shungaku-in (春岳院)	thirty-seven items		34°39′03″N 135°47′03″E	
Diaries of the head of the Yanagisawa Family 柳澤家当主年録及び日記類; Yanagisawa-ke tōshu nenroku oyobi nikki-rui	Edo period	Yamatokōriyama	Kōriyama Castle Site and Yanagisawa Bunko Preservation Society (kept at Yanagisawa Bunko (柳沢文庫))	1,800 items		34°39′04″N 135°46′49″E	
Woodblocks for the Hase-dera edition of the Mandala of the Two Realms 長谷寺版両界曼荼羅板木; Hasedera-ban ryōkai mandara hangi	Edo period	Sakurai	Hase-dera	two items		34°32′09″N 135°54′25″E	
Martial arts-related materials of the Komparu Family 金春家武芸関係資料; Konparu-ke bugei kankei shiryō	Momoyama and Edo periods	Ikoma	Hōzan-ji	thirteen scrolls		34°41′05″N 135°41′12″E	

== Municipal Cultural Properties ==
Properties designated at a municipal level include:

Property	Date	Municipality	Ownership	Comments	Image	Coordinates	Ref.
Annals of Inoue-chō 井上町町中年代記; Inoue-chō chōchū nendaiki	Edo period	Nara	Inoue-chō (kept at the Historical Materials Preservation House)	four volumes, covering the second half of the seventeenth century to the end of the Bakumatsu period, of the total seven		34°40′40″N 135°49′45″E	
Yorozu Ōchō 萬大帳; Yorozu ōchō	1645-1883	Nara	Higashimuki Kitamachi (kept at the Historical Materials Preservation House)	ten volumes		34°40′40″N 135°49′45″E	
Diaries of the Nara Bugyō Office Yoriki and Town Officials 奈良奉行所与力・町代日記; Nara bugyō-sho yoriki・chōdai nikki	1667-1807	Nara	private (kept at the Historical Materials Preservation House)	six volumes		34°40′40″N 135°49′45″E	
Materials relating to the large earthquake in the sixth month of Kaei 7 嘉永七年六月大地震関係資料; Kaei shichi-nen roku-gatsu dai-jishin kankei shiryō	1854	Nara	corporate and private	two volumes, the Diary of difficulties caused by the great earthquake (大地震難渋日記) and the Earthquake book (地震帳)		34°43′09″N 136°03′44″E	
Materials of the Kioku Family, from the Kasuga carpentry guild 春日座大工木奥家資料; Kasuga-za daiku Kioku-ke shiryō	Edo period	Nara	private	282 items, comprising 194 tools, 26 documents, and 62 plans and drawings		34°40′35″N 135°49′50″E	

== Registered Cultural Properties ==
As of 1 November 2015, one property has been registered (as opposed to designated).

Property	Date	Municipality	Ownership	Comments	Image	Coordinates	Ref.
Glass plates by Kudō Risaburō 工藤利三郎撮影写真ガラス原板; Kudō Risaburō satsuei shashin garasu genban	Meiji and Taishō periods	Nara	Irie Taikichi Memorial Museum of Photography Nara City	1,025 glass plates		34°40′32″N 135°50′44″E	

== See also ==
- Cultural Properties of Japan
- List of Historic Sites of Japan (Nara)
- Yamato Province
- Nara National Museum
- List of National Treasures of Japan (historical materials)
- List of Cultural Properties of Japan - paintings (Nara)
