= Thirteen Buddhist Sites of Yamato =

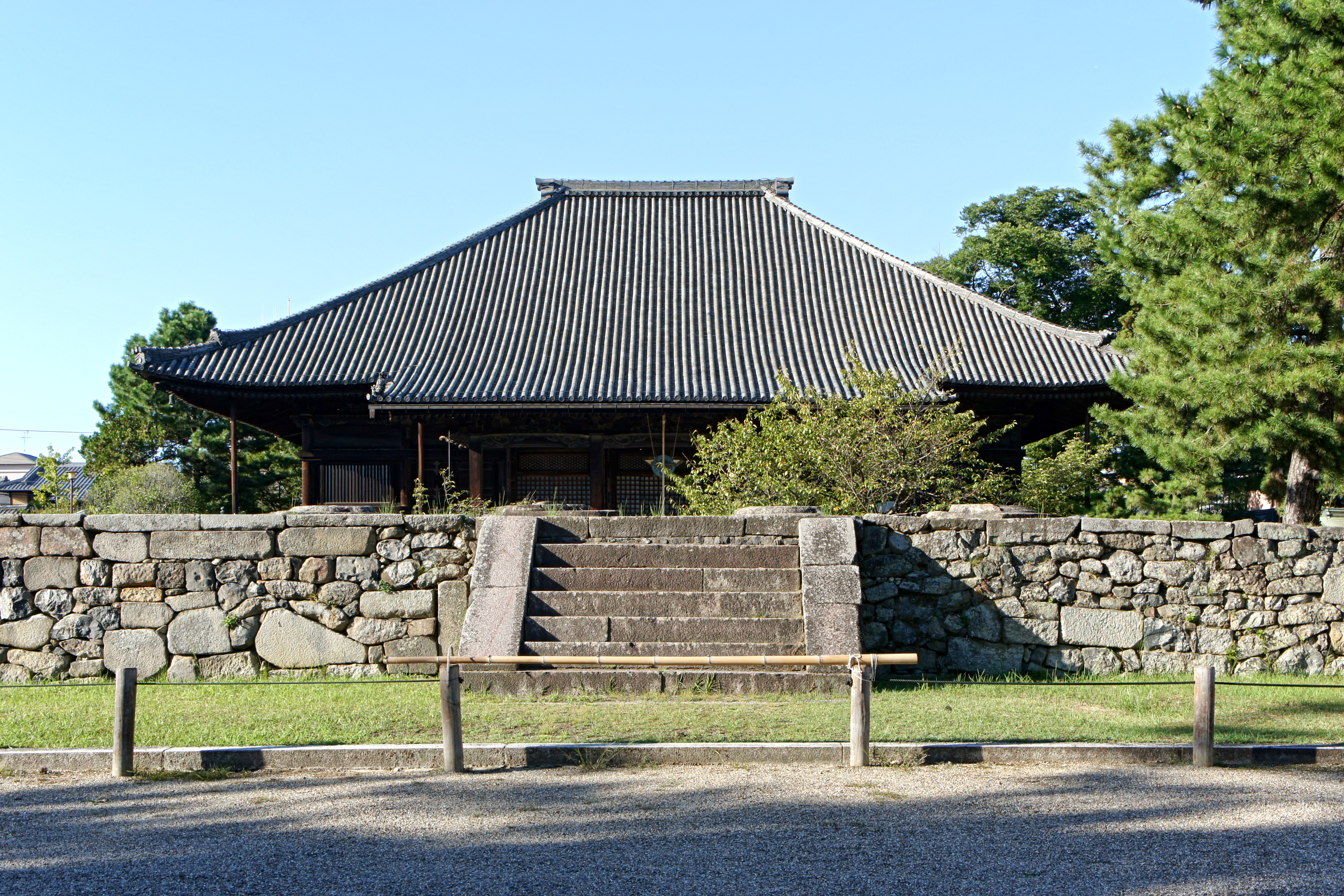
Main hall, or hondō, Saidai-ji

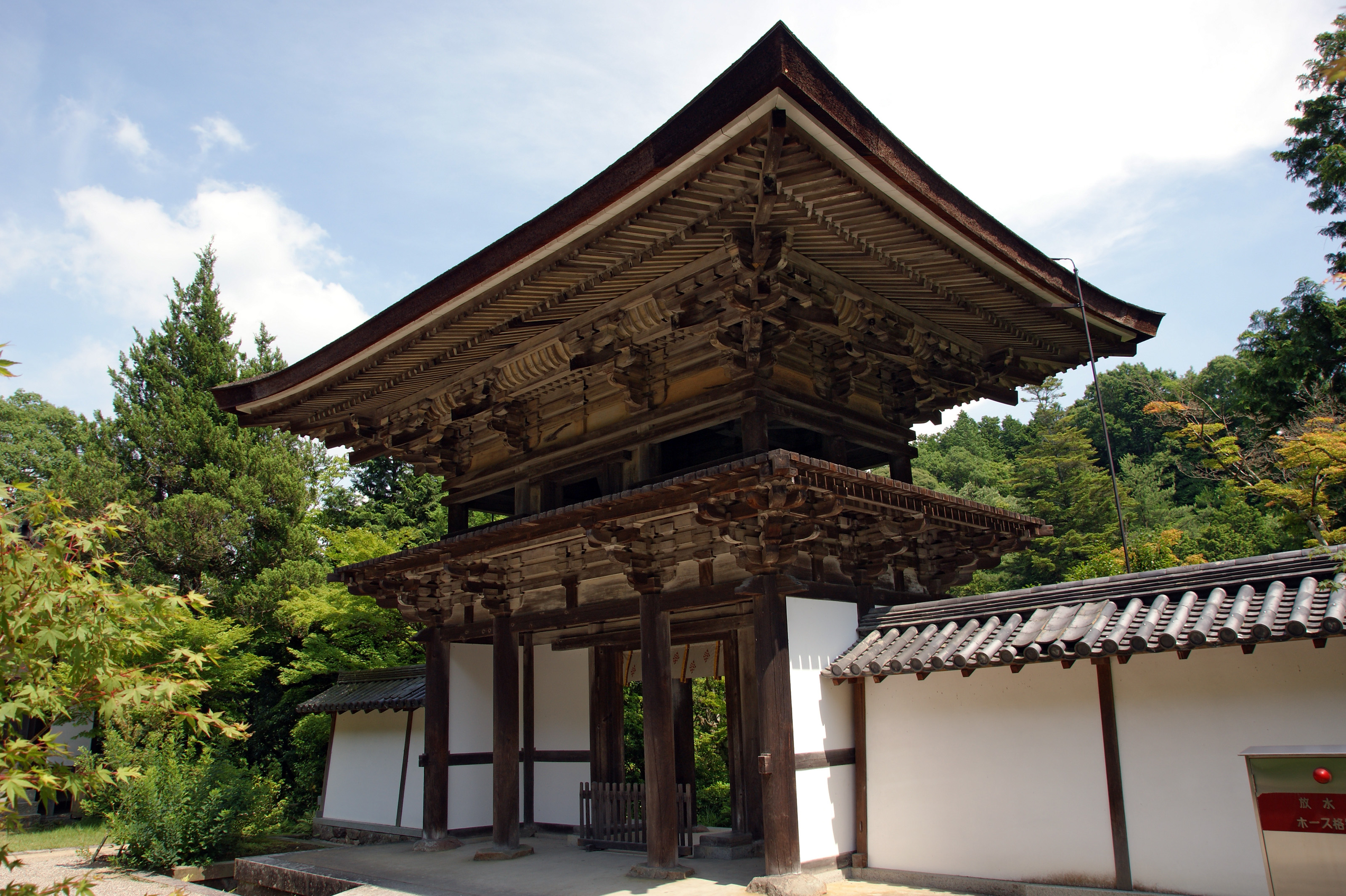
Enjō-ji, Nara

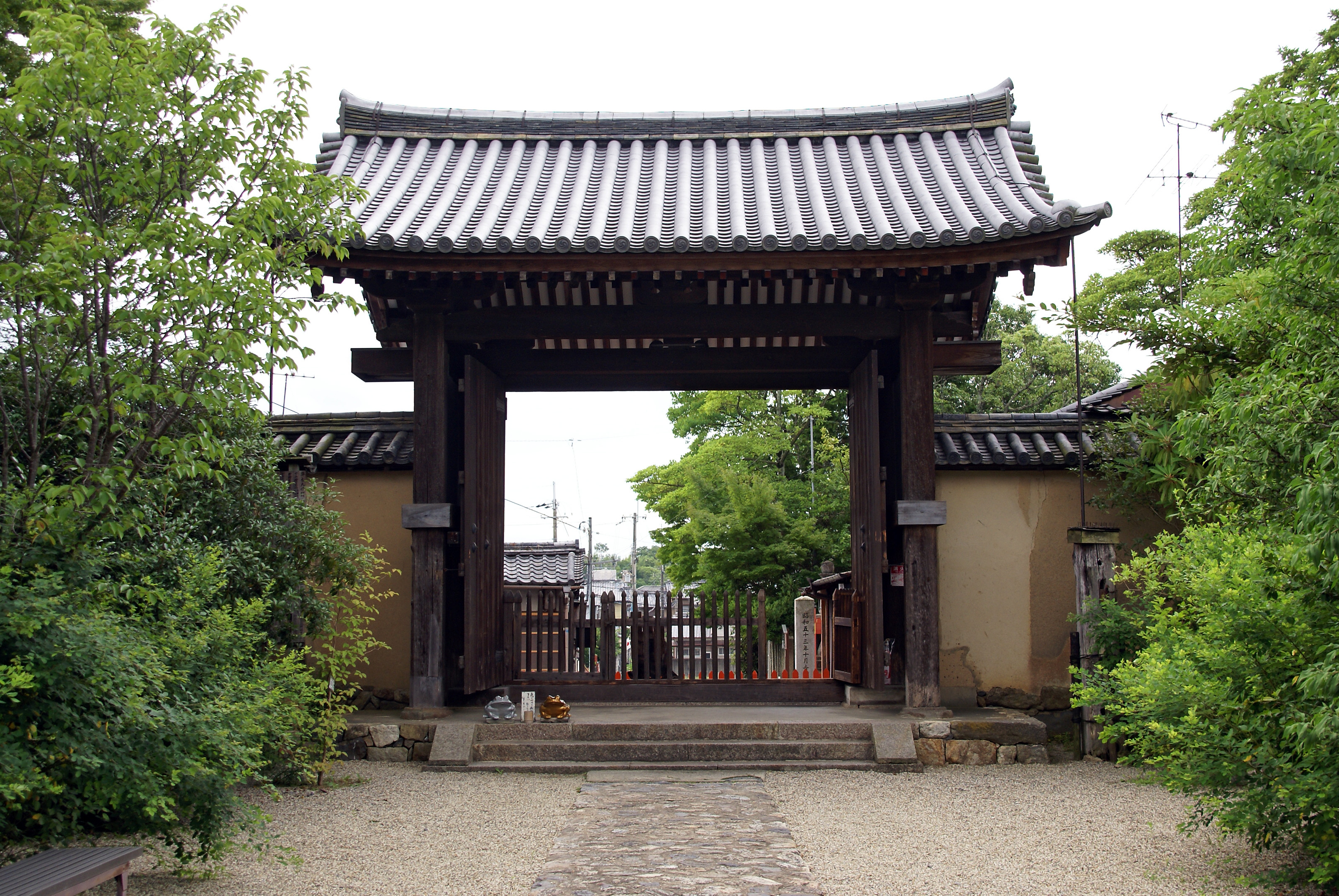
Shin-Yakushi-ji, Nara

The Thirteen Buddhist Sites of Yamato (大和十三仏霊場, Yamato jūsan butsu reijō) are a group of 13 Buddhist sacred sites in Nara Prefecture. Yamato was a former province of Japan corresponding to today's Nara Prefecture. The majority of the temples in this grouping are part of Japanese esoteric Shingon Buddhism.

== Directory ==
Number	Mountain designation (山号)	Temple name	Sect	Dedication	Address
1.	Mount Ikoma	Hōzan-ji	Shingon Risshu	Fudō-myōō	Ikoma, Monzencho 1-1
2.	Shōhōzan	Saidai-ji	Shingon Risshu	Shaka Nyorai	Nara, Saidaiji Shibacho 1-chome 1-5
3.	Abesan	Abe Monju-in	Kegon	Monju Bosatsu	Sakurai, Abe 645
4.	Kamanokuchisan	Chōgaku-ji	Kōyasan Shingon-shū	Fugen Bosatsu	Tenri, Yanagimotocho 508
5.	Yatayama	Yata-dera	Kōyasan Shingon-shū	Jizō Bosatsu	Yamatokōriyama, Yatacho 3506
6.	Nijōzan	Taima-dera	Kōyasan Shingon-shū・Jōdo-shū	Miroku Bosatsu	Katsuragi, Taima 1263
7.	Nichirinzan	Shin-Yakushi-ji	Kegon	Yakushi Nyorai	Nara, Takabatakecho 1352
8.	Jumuryozan	Ofusa Kannon	Kōyasan Shingon-shū	Kannon Bosatsu	Kashihara, Ousacho 6-22
9.	Mayumiyama	Chōkyūji	Shingon Risshu	Seishi Bosatsu	Ikoma, Kamimachi 4443
10.	Tomisan	Ryōsen-ji	Ryōsen-ji Shingon-shū	Amida Nyorai	Nara, Nakamachi 3879
11.	Shigisan	Shigisan Gyokuzōin	Shigisan Shingon-shū	Ashoku Nyorai	Ikoma District, Heguri Oaza Shigisan 2280
12.	Ninnikusen	Enjō-ji	Shingon-shū Omuro-ha	Dainichi Nyorai	Nara, Ninnikusencho 1273
13.	Kumagorisan	Daian-ji	Kōyasan Shingon-shū	Kokūzō Bosatsu	Nara, Daian-ji 2-chome 18-1

== See also ==
- Thirteen Buddhas
