= Y21 =

Y21 may refer to:

== Rail station codes in Japan ==
- Ikoma-Sanjō Station, in Ikoma, Nara
- Minoura Station, in Kan'onji, Kagawa
- Numanosawa Station, in Yūbari, Hokkaidō
- Suminoekōen Station, in Suminoe-ku, Osaka
- Tsukishima Station, in Chūō, Tokyo
- Yasuura Station, in Kure, Hiroshima

== Other uses ==
- Bandy World Championship Y-21
- HMS Sennen (Y21), a sloop of the Royal Navy
