= Mount Ikoma =

Mountain in the country of Japan

- 生駒山
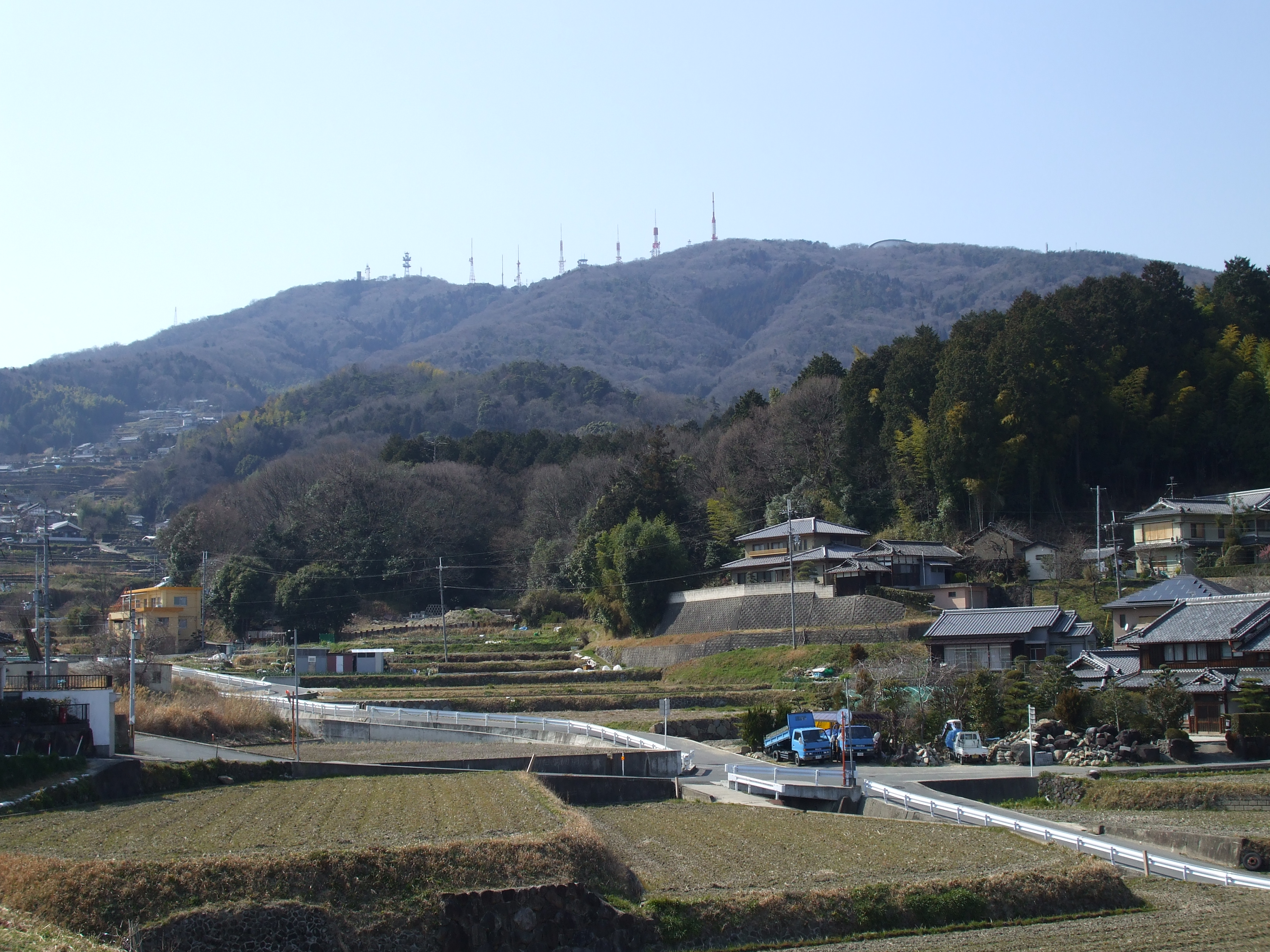
- A view of Mt. Ikoma

Highest point
- Elevation: 642 m (2,106 ft)
- Coordinates: 34°40′42.43″N 135°40′44.29″E

Naming
- Pronunciation: Japanese: [ikomajama]

Geography
- Location within Japan
- Location: Ikoma, Nara, Japan; Higashiosaka, Osaka, Japan
- Parent range: Ikoma Mountains

Mount Ikoma (生駒山, Ikoma-yama) is a mountain on the border of Nara Prefecture and Osaka Prefecture in Japan. It is the highest peak in the Ikoma Mountains with a height of 642 meters.

Mount Ikoma is a part of Kongō-Ikoma-Kisen Quasi-National Park. It is one of the most famous picnic spots in the Kansai region. On the top of the mountain, there are many TV towers for broadcasting to the Kansai region and Ikoma Sanjo Amusement Park.

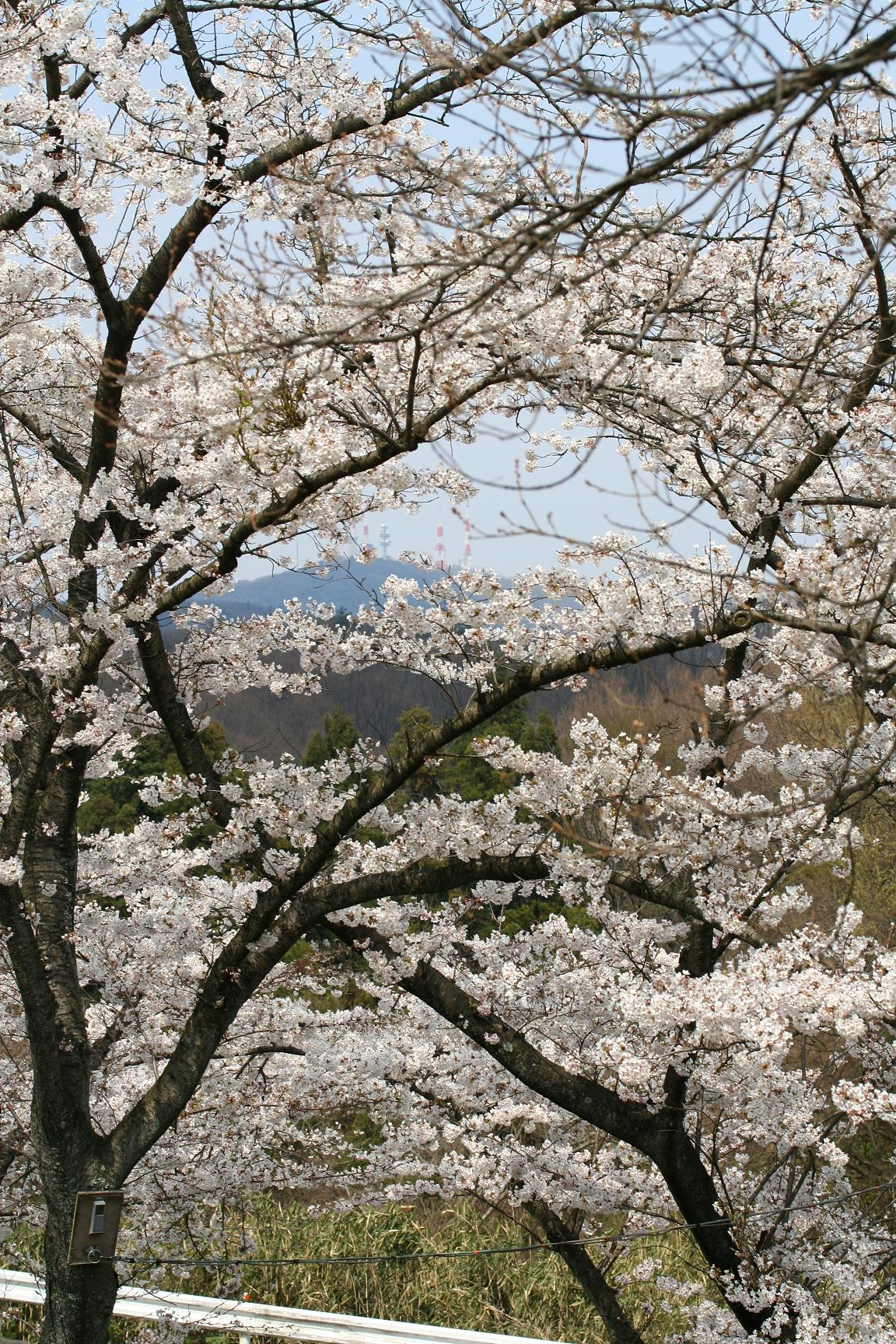
Cherry trees in blossom on Mount Ikoma

== History ==
Mount Ikoma was an important object of worship for ancient Japanese people. On the east foot of the mountain, Ikoma Jinja (literally 'Shrine for Mount Ikoma') has existed since the 5th century. The mountain and the Hozan-ji temple near the summit were traditionally celebrated as national scenery and included in well-known woodblock series such as the "Sixty-eight National Views."

After the Second World War, the west foot of the mountain started to host religious institutions serving the spiritual needs of Korean immigrants and residents of Korean descent, mostly women.

The city itself was transformed by the Kintetsu train tunnel. Pilgrims and visitors to the temple grew, as well as tourist-related inns and eating establishments. After the Pacific War, the area below the temple developed into an active red-light and entertainment district. The local geisha prospered.

Ikoma today retains a bit of the old atmosphere with its winding, narrow streets. Ikoma nurtured lively traditional Japanese arts such as dance and varieties of Japanese music. The walk down from the mountain temple to the town is a noted area for cherry blossoms, as is the mountain itself with its Ikoma Skyline Drive developed by Kintetsu Corporation.

== Geography ==
=== Climate ===
Mount Ikoma has a humid subtropical climate (Köppen Cfa) characterized by warm summers and cool winters with light to no snowfall. The average annual temperature in Mount Ikoma is 12.1 °C (53.8 °F). The average annual rainfall is 1,527.7 mm (60.15 in) with June as the wettest month. The temperatures are highest on average in August, at around 23.6 °C (74.5 °F), and lowest in January, at around 0.9 °C (33.6 °F).

Climate data for Mount Ikoma (1991−2020 normals, extremes 1976−present)
Month	Jan	Feb	Mar	Apr	May	Jun	Jul	Aug	Sep	Oct	Nov	Dec	Year
Record high °C (°F)	14.2 (57.6)	18.4 (65.1)	22.2 (72.0)	26.8 (80.2)	27.9 (82.2)	31.4 (88.5)	33.4 (92.1)	34.3 (93.7)	31.7 (89.1)	28.3 (82.9)	22.6 (72.7)	21.4 (70.5)	34.3 (93.7)
Mean daily maximum °C (°F)	4.6 (40.3)	5.7 (42.3)	10.0 (50.0)	15.8 (60.4)	20.4 (68.7)	23.1 (73.6)	26.9 (80.4)	28.6 (83.5)	24.3 (75.7)	18.5 (65.3)	12.9 (55.2)	7.3 (45.1)	16.5 (61.7)
Daily mean °C (°F)	0.9 (33.6)	1.5 (34.7)	5.0 (41.0)	10.5 (50.9)	15.2 (59.4)	18.7 (65.7)	22.5 (72.5)	23.6 (74.5)	19.9 (67.8)	14.4 (57.9)	9.0 (48.2)	3.6 (38.5)	12.1 (53.7)
Mean daily minimum °C (°F)	−1.9 (28.6)	−1.8 (28.8)	1.0 (33.8)	6.3 (43.3)	11.3 (52.3)	15.5 (59.9)	19.7 (67.5)	20.5 (68.9)	16.9 (62.4)	11.4 (52.5)	5.9 (42.6)	0.6 (33.1)	8.8 (47.8)
Record low °C (°F)	−9.7 (14.5)	−11.7 (10.9)	−8.7 (16.3)	−4.2 (24.4)	1.5 (34.7)	8.2 (46.8)	12.2 (54.0)	13.0 (55.4)	8.0 (46.4)	1.1 (34.0)	−3.1 (26.4)	−7.5 (18.5)	−11.7 (10.9)
Average precipitation mm (inches)	52.2 (2.06)	64.8 (2.55)	111.8 (4.40)	114.2 (4.50)	161.3 (6.35)	213.6 (8.41)	199.2 (7.84)	146.4 (5.76)	166.5 (6.56)	155.4 (6.12)	81.6 (3.21)	60.6 (2.39)	1,527.7 (60.15)
Average precipitation days (≥ 1.0 mm)	6.2	7.3	10.2	10.2	10.6	12.6	12.0	8.8	11.3	10.0	7.6	7.0	113.8
Mean monthly sunshine hours	126.6	122.5	159.0	183.9	191.5	138.1	158.4	206.6	150.9	156.3	141.1	132.2	1,864.4
Source: Japan Meteorological Agency

== Access ==
- Ikoma Sanjo Station of Ikoma Cable Line
