= Ryōsen-ji (Nara) =

Buddhist temple in Nara, Japan

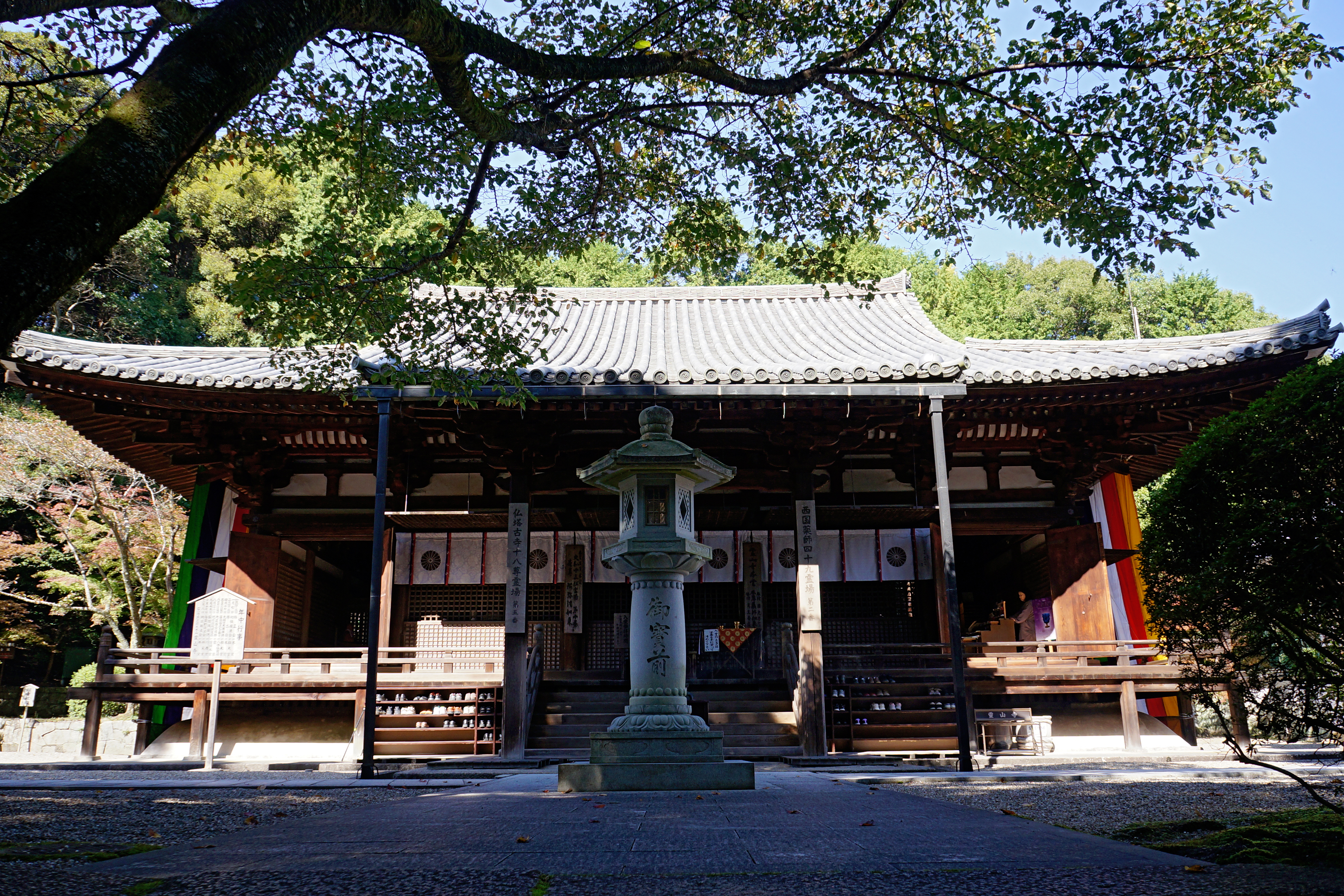
- Ryōsen-ji Hondō (1283), a National Treasure

Religion
- Affiliation: Ryōsen-ji Shingon Buddhism
- Deity: Yakushi Nyorai

Location
- Location: 3879 Nakamachi, Nara; 631-0052
- Country: Japan
- Interactive map of Ryōsen-ji
- Coordinates: 34°40′24″N 135°44′33″E

Architecture
- Completed: 736

Website
- Ryōsen-ji

Ryōsen-ji (霊山寺) is a Buddhist temple in Nara, Japan. Founded in the eighth century, the Hondō is a National Treasure and a number of other buildings and temple treasures have been designated Important Cultural Properties.

== History ==
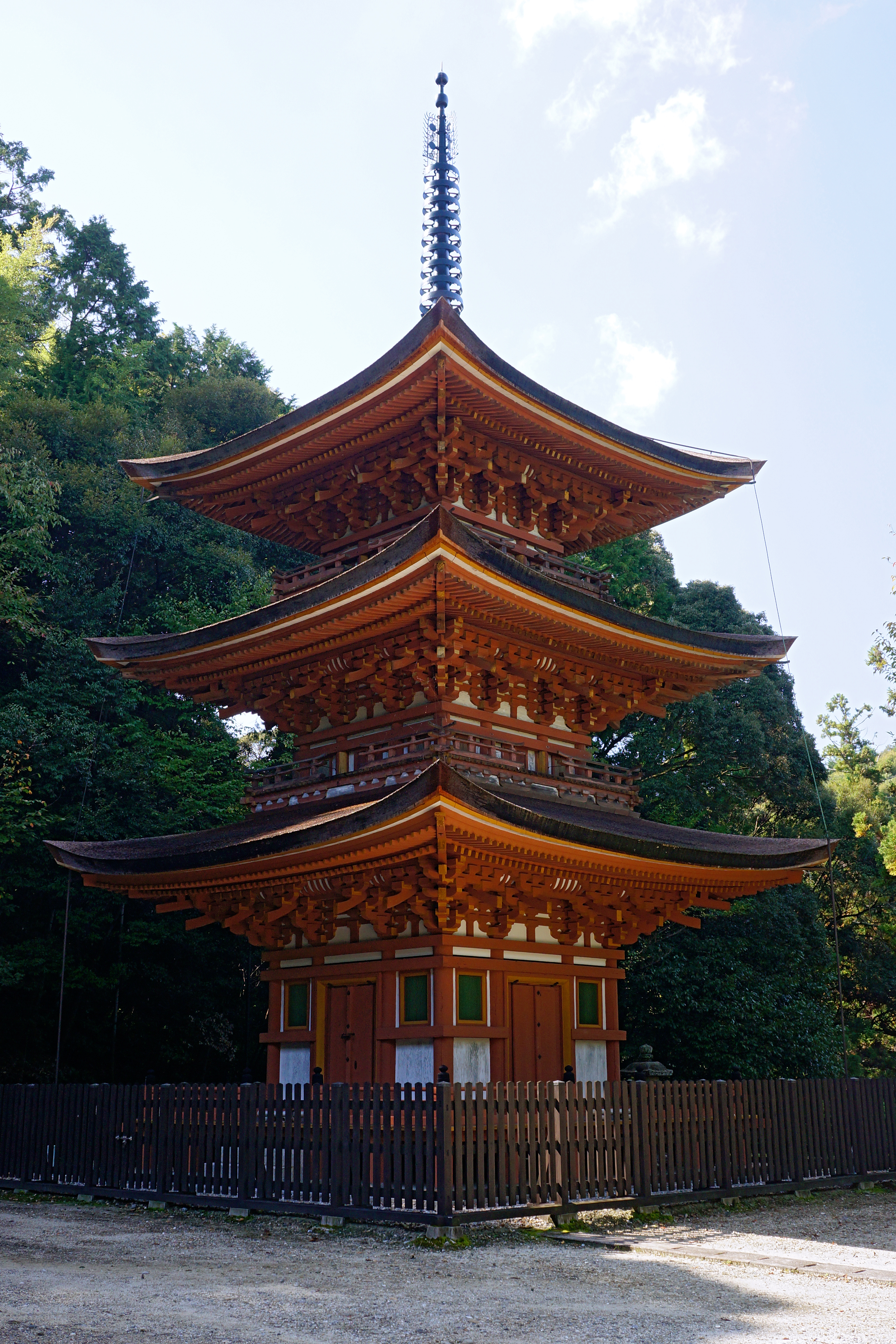
Pagoda

In the late seventh century Ono no Tobito erected a set of public baths on Mount Tomi outside Nara and enshrined an image of Yakushi. In 734 Emperor Shōmu instructed Gyōki to erect a hall on the site, and two years later the Indian monk Bodhisena, noticing a resemblance to the Vulture Peak, founded the Ryōsen-ji. The Hondō was rebuilt in 1283. Toyotomi Hideyoshi granted the temple lands valued at a hundred koku. In the Meiji period many of the monk's quarters were abandoned and over two hundred images were burned. Restored in 1940, the temple has been revived.

== Buildings ==
- Hondō (1283), 5x6 bay, irimoya-zukuri, tiled roof (National Treasure)
- Niōmon (1516), three bay, one door (Important Cultural Property)
- Three storey pagoda (1356), hinoki bark roof (ICP)
- Shōrō (mid-Muromachi period), single bay, irimoya-zukuri, hinoki bark roof (ICP)

== Treasures ==
- Wall painting inside the three-storey pagoda (late Kamakura period to Nambokuchō period) (ICP)
- Seated statue of Yakushi Nyorai (ICP)
- Statues of Nikkō Bosatsu and Gakkō Bosatsu (ICP)
- Zushi (1285) (ICP)
- Statues of Jūni Shinshō (Kamakura period) (ICP)
- Plaque of Buddha triad (Hakuhō period) (ICP)
- Seated statue of Amida Nyorai (twelfth century) (ICP)
- Seated statue of Dainichi Nyorai (late Heian period) (ICP)
- Statue of Jūichimen Kannon (early Heian period) (ICP)
- Statue of Bishamonten (twelfth century) (ICP)
- Statues of Jikokuten and Bishamonten (late Kamakura period) (ICP)
- Statue of Jizō Bosatsu (1256) (ICP)
- Pendant disc of Yakushi triad (1366) (ICP)
- Pendant disc (Kamakura period) (ICP)
- Seated statue of Gyōki
- Seated statue of Bodhisena

== Jūrokusho Jinja ==
Jūrokusho Jinja (十六所神社) is now an independent shrine, but before the Meiji period served Ryōsen-ji in a tutelary capacity. The Honden (1384) and subordinate Sumiyoshi Jinja Honden and Ryūō Jinja Honden (both 1386) have been designated Important Cultural Properties.

== See also ==
- List of National Treasures of Japan (temples)
- Thirteen Buddhist Sites of Yamato
