= Shin-Yakushi-ji =

Coordinates: 34°40′33″N 135°50′46″E

Shin-Yakushi-ji 新薬師寺
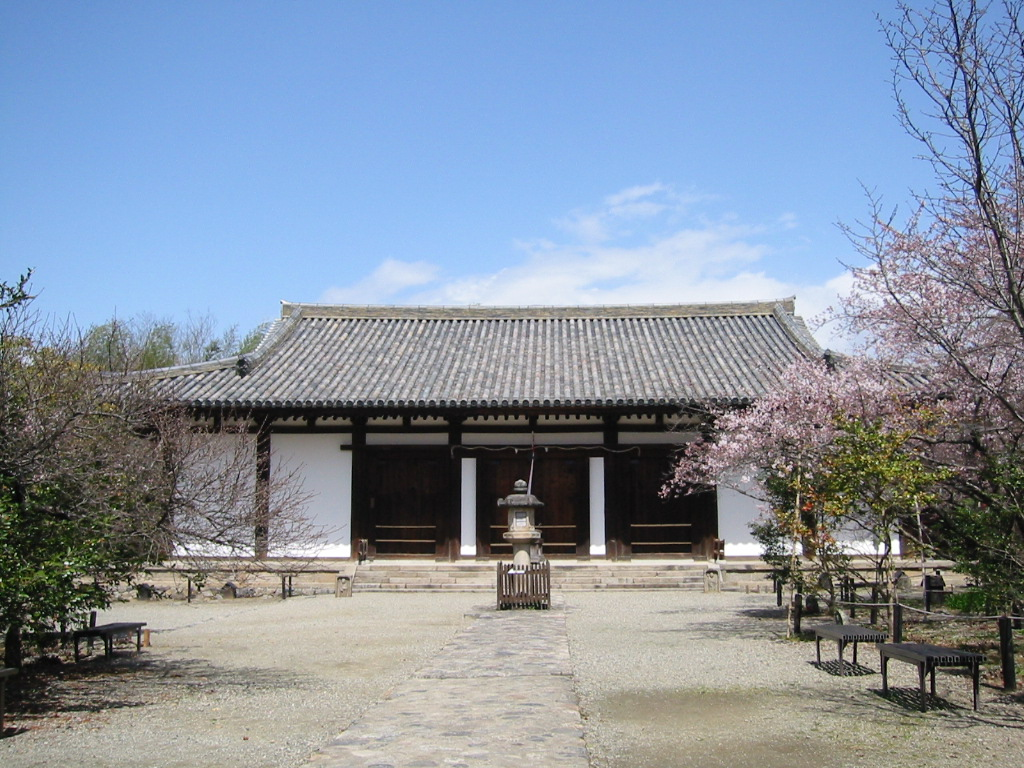
- The Hon-dō at Shin-Yakushi-ji

Religion
- Affiliation: Kegon sect
- Deity: Yakushi Nyorai

Location
- Location: 1352 Takabatake-chō, Nara-shi, Nara-ken; 630-8301
- Country: Japan
- Interactive map of Shin-Yakushi-ji 新薬師寺

Architecture
- Founder: Empress Kōmyō
- Completed: 747

Website
- http://www.shinyakushiji.or.jp/

Shin-Yakushi-ji (新薬師寺) is a Buddhist temple of the Kegon sect in Nara, Japan. It was founded in 747 by Empress Kōmyō. Initially a large complete Shichidō garan temple, it suffered from fire damage and deteriorated during the Heian period. The temple was revived during the Kamakura period. Only one building, the present main hall or Hon-dō (本堂), has survived from the 8th century. All other structures date to the Kamakura period.

Shin-Yakushi-ji owns several cultural assets. The Hon-dō, the principal image of Yakushi Nyorai and eleven statues of the Twelve Heavenly Generals have been designated by the Ministry of Education, Culture, Sports, Science and Technology of the government of Japan as National Treasures.

== Name ==
The shin, atarashi (新) in the name is usually translated as new. In the case of Shin-Yakushi-ji however it is said to have the meaning of miraculous (霊験, arataka na). Yakushi refers to the principal image of the healing Buddha Yakushi Nyorai. Besides the veneration of Yakushi Nyorai, there is no connection to the famous Yakushi-ji which is also located in Nara.

== History ==
According to records at Tōdai-ji, Shin-Yakushi-ji was founded in March 747 as Kōyaku-ji (香薬寺) by Empress Kōmyō wishing for the recovery of her husband, Emperor Shōmu, who suffered from an eye ailment. She had a large nine bay temple hall (Kon-dō) built and statues of the Seven Buddhas of Healing (七仏薬師, shichibutsu yakushi) enshrined in it. Such statues were thought to be efficacious against the evil spirits of dead political figures.

Together with the Yakushi Nyorai, statues of attendants Nikkō Bosatsu and Gakkō Bosatsu, and groups of Twelve Heavenly Generals were enshrined in the main hall or Kon-dō. Next to the Kon-dō an east and a west pagoda were erected. In those early days more than 100 monks were studying at the temple. There were living quarters for the monks and many other structures. It was a complete seven-structured temple, a Shichidō garan covering around 200,000 m^{2}.

In 780, 33 years after the foundation, many buildings were destroyed by fire which was caused by a thunderbolt. When the Kon-dō was destroyed in the mid Heian period, another building, today's Hon-dō became the main hall of the temple. It is thought that this building used to be the refectory (食堂 Jiki-dō). The Twelve Heavenly Generals surrounding the main image of Yakushi Nyorai were transferred to the hall from the ruined Iwabuchi-dera (岩淵寺) located not far from Shin-Yakushi-ji on the foot of Mount Kasuga.

In the Kamakura period the priests Jōkei (貞慶) (posthumous name: Gedatsu Shōnin) and Myōe restored the temple after the general decline. Around that time today's East Gate, South Gate, belfry and Jizō Hall were built.

== Architecture ==
=== Hon-dō ===
The main hall, or Hon-dō (本堂), from the 8th century, Nara period is the oldest extant structure at Shin-Yakushi-ji and one of the oldest wooden buildings in Japan. However it was not designed as the main hall of the temple. The Kon-dō from the time of founding differed from the present main hall in size and its position within the temple grounds. Until about the mid-Heian period the two structures coexisted. During the Kengen era (1302–1303) the Hon-dō was thoroughly restored.

The construction features a large hip-and-gable irimoya style roof and white washed walls. Inside thick pillars placed on the dirt floor carry the roof. The open ceiling which used to be painted red, leaves the sheathing beams and rafters visible. There is a stained glass window in the east wall of the hall. The Hon-dō has been designated as a National Treasure and houses the main image of Yakushi Nyorai surrounded by a group of Twelve Heavenly Generals.

=== South Gate ===
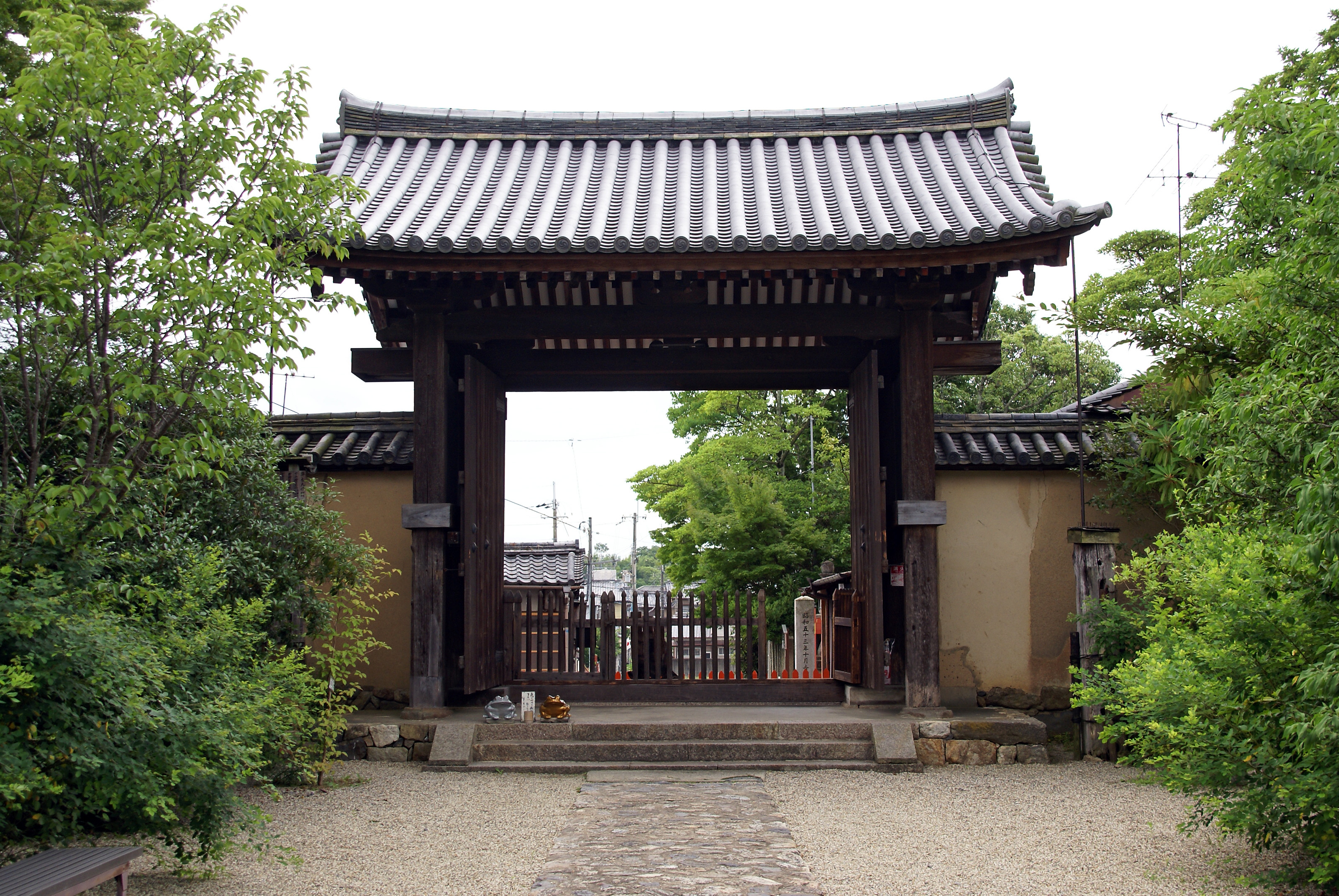
South Gate

The South Gate (南門, nanmon), an Important Cultural Property, is the oldest extant example of a four-legged gate (四脚門, shikyakumon). It was built during the Kamakura period at the end of the 12th or the beginning of the 13th century. Gates in this style only appear in high ranking temples or Imperial Palace gates, thus indicating the former status of Shin-Yakushi-ji. The four posts of the gate have very wide chamfered edges and are placed on a platform of unhewn rocks.

=== East Gate ===
The upper parts of the main pillars in the East Gate (東門, tōmon) are split in two, held by solid-board frog-leg struts (板蟇股, itakaerumata). This unusual style points to a construction date in the early Kamakura period. The gate has been designated as Important Cultural Property.

=== Jizō Hall ===
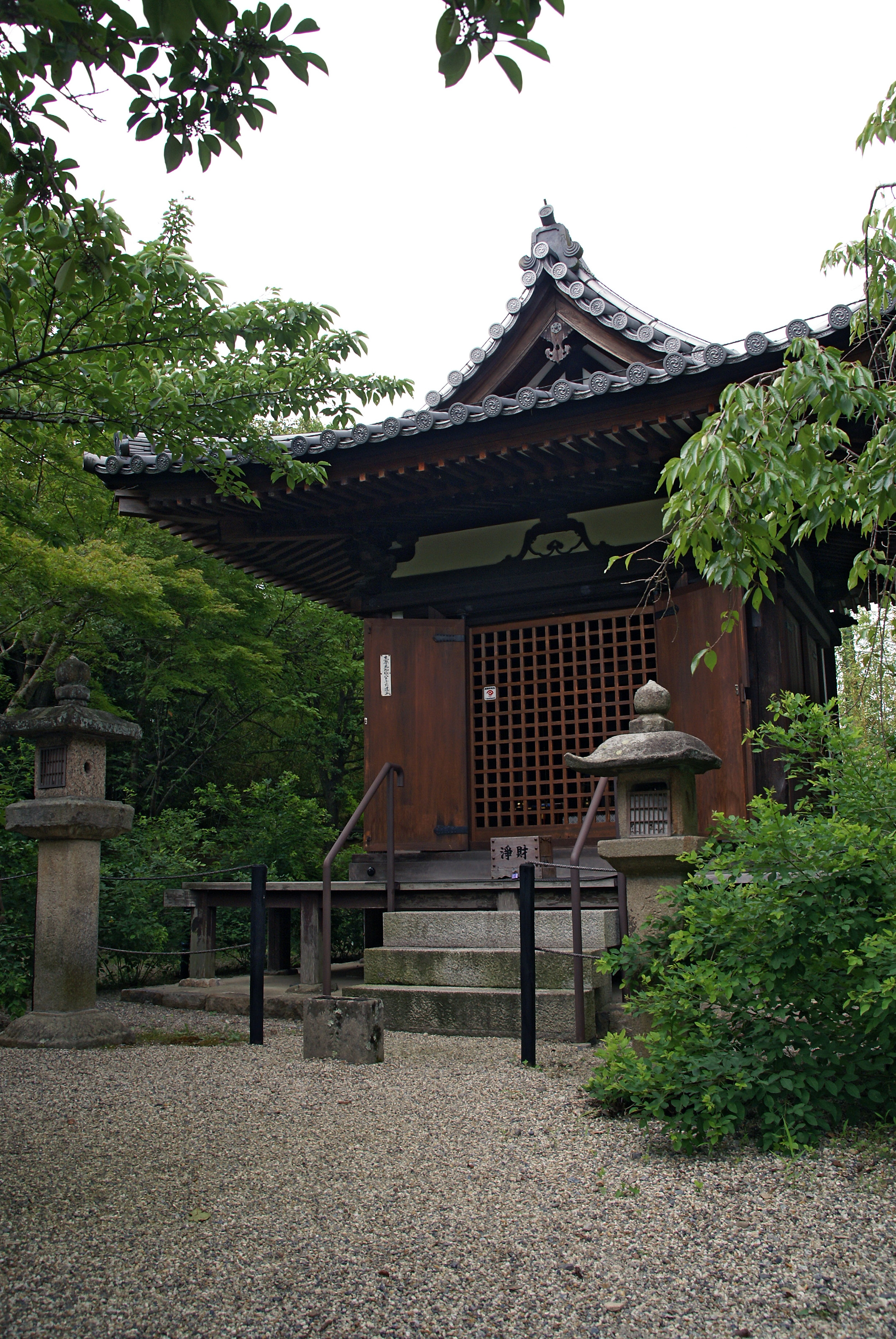
Jizō Hall

The Jizō Hall (地蔵堂, jizō-dō), an Important Cultural Property, takes its name from the image of the deity Jizō that would have been enshrined in this building. It is a small 3.05 by 3.05 metres (10.0 by 10.0 ft) construction in Japanese style (和様, wayō) from the Kamakura period. Currently an image of the Eleven-faced Goddess of Mercy is enshrined in the building.

=== Belfry ===
Built in 1279, the belfry (鐘楼, shōrō) is another structure from the Kamakura period and a designated Important Cultural Property. The building features a flared, skirt-like lower portion, also known as hakamagoshi (袴腰) style, which became popular in the late Heian period and thereafter.

The bell, an Important Cultural Property, is reportedly the hanging bell of the belfry (釣鐘堂, tsuriganedō) at Gangō-ji and dates to the Nara period. It is famous through the story of an ogre which is told in the Nihon Ryōiki. According to this legend, in the Asuka period there lived an Oni in the belfry at Gangō-ji who was tormenting the people. The Oni, known by the names Gagoze, Gagoji, Guwagoze (元興寺) or Oni from Gangō-ji (元興寺の鬼, gangō-ji no oni), was the spirit of a villainous manservant of the temple. One day, a child with superhuman strength who had joined the temple, decides to kill the ogre and lies in wait in the belfry. At early dawn the Oni appears; the child seizes the Oni by his hair and drags him around. At dawn, the Oni had lost all his hair and takes to flight.

The child chases after him but loses him at a crossroad. Later, the superhuman child enters priesthood and becomes the monk Dōjō (道場法師, Dōjō hōshi). After the belfry at Gangō-ji burns down, the bell is transferred to nearby Shin-Yakushi-ji. The scars on the bell are said to be the fingernail marks of the Oni. The area around the crossroad at which the Oni lost his pursuer has been named fushin ga tsujichō (不審ケ辻町) and the place he turns into hiding Mount Kion (鬼隠山, kionzan), literally: Oni hiding mountain.

== Treasures ==
=== Yakushi Nyorai ===
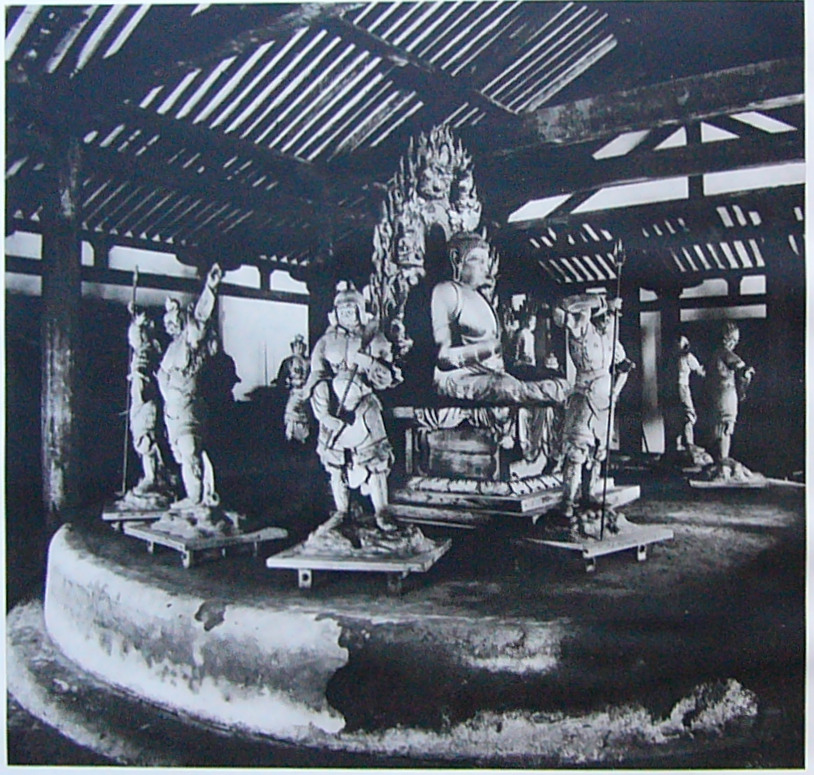
Yakushi Nyorai surrounded by the Twelve Heavenly Generals

The 191.5 cm, Heian period seated Yakushi Nyorai is the principal image of Shin-Yakushi-ji. He is placed on a huge (9 m diameter, 90 cm high) circular platform (Dais) which almost entirely fills the Hon-dō. Together with six small Buddha images (化仏, kebutsu) on its halo, the main statue forms a group of Seven Buddhas of Healing (七仏薬師, shichibutsu yakushi). Yakushi Nyorai is protected by Twelve Heavenly Generals arranged in a circular fashion around it facing outward.

The present image is probably not one of those that had been installed in the original Kon-dō and were made in a hollow dry lacquer (脱活乾漆造, dakkatsu kanshitsu zukuri) technique. However, there are conflicting theories concerning the origin of the present statue. It might have been carved in 793 together with the reconstruction of the temple after fire damage. Generally it is considered to be a work of the end of the 8th century and a good representative example of early Heian period wooden sculptures. It is cut from a single Hinoki tree and neither paint nor lacquer have been applied to the wood except for some colour to indicate facial features. Distinctive are the protuberant lips, well defined curls and large nose. The eyebrows painted in black are narrow and acute. His right arm is lifted showing the Mudra of no fear (Abhayamudra) while his left arm rests on his leg with the palm of his hand turned up holding a medicine pot.

During an investigation in 1975, eight scrolls of the Lotus Sutra from the early Heian period were discovered inside the body of the sculpture. The scrolls have been designated as National Treasure.

=== Twelve Heavenly Generals ===
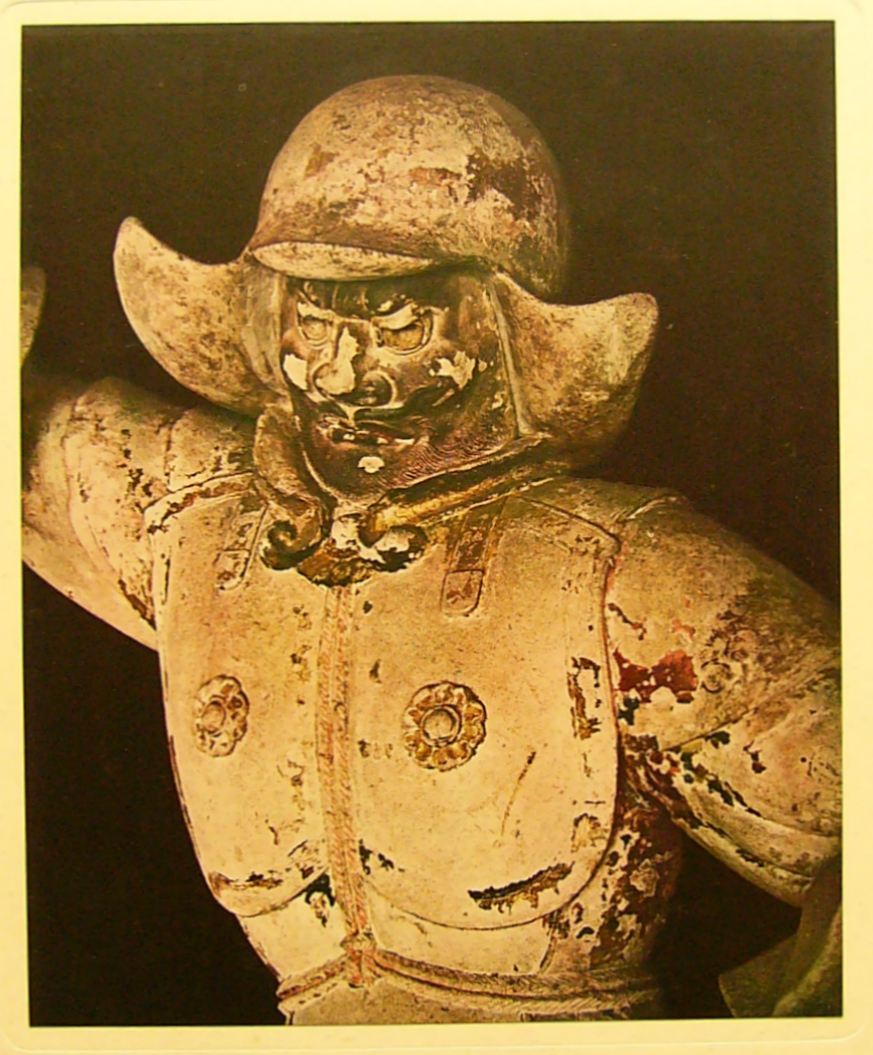
Antera

The Nara period, roughly life-size standing group of Twelve Heavenly Generals from 729–749 is the oldest extant in Japan. It was made of unbaked clay and originally colored. The skin was salmon color. Beards were drawn with ink, cloths and armour painted in bright colors and gold foil applied in places. Not much of the original decoration remains. The statue of Haira was damaged in an earthquake at the end of the Edo period and replaced by a wooden statue in 1931. As protective deities of Yakushi all twelve generals are placed in a circle surrounding the main image of Yakushi Nyorai. Eleven of the twelve statues have been designated as National Treasure. The image of Haira from the 20th century is excluded from the nomination. There are two different mappings of names to individual statues in place. In the following the first name is the one used by the temple. The second name, in parentheses, is as assigned in the National Treasure nomination.

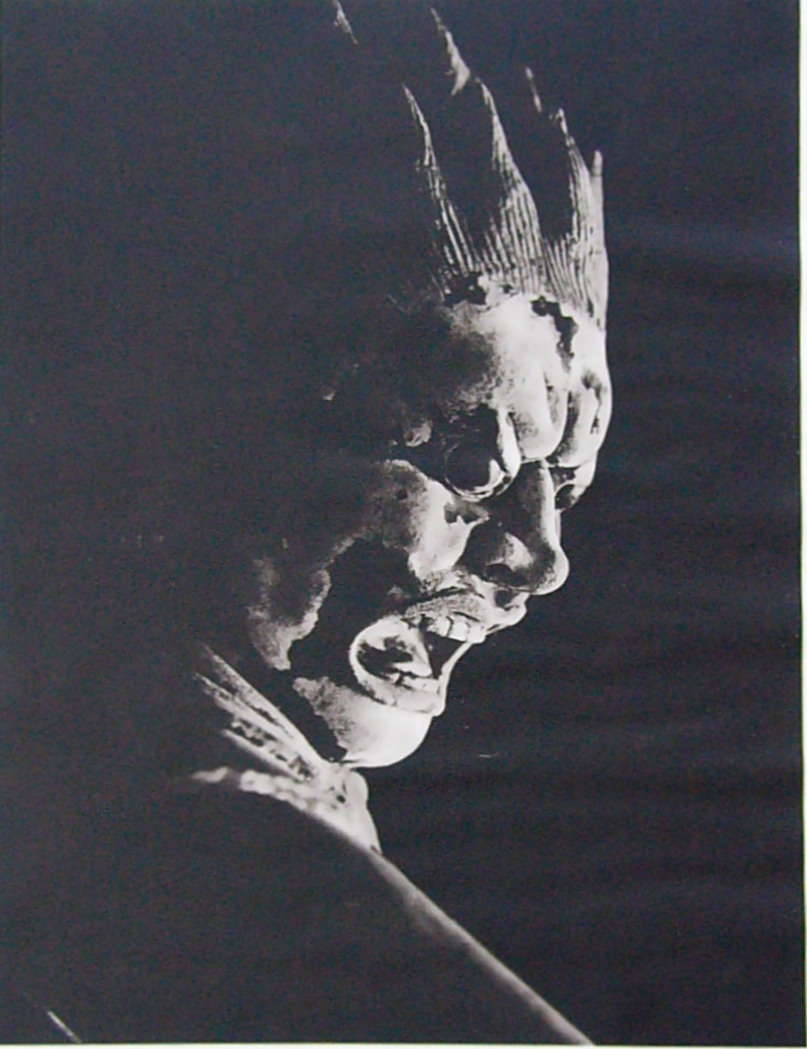
Meikira

The twelve statues in counter-clockwise order starting at the front right (south east) are:

- Bazara (Meikira): 162.9 cm, with hair standing on ends and an open mouth as if crying out. He holds a sword in his right hand.
- Anira (Anira): 154.2 cm, wearing a helmet and holding an arrow with both hands. He scrutinizes the nock of the arrow. As a whole he appears rather plump compared to other statues like the one of Meikira.
- Haira (Kubira): 159.5 cm. The original clay statue was damaged in an earthquake at the end of the Edo period. The present statue is wooden and dates to 1931. It is not a National Treasure. Haira is depicted wearing a helmet, holding a bow and arrow.
- Bigyara (Bigyara): 162.1 cm, brandishing a pestle with three prongs at each end (三鈷杵, sankosho), a type of vajra, in his raised right arm. His left hand rests on his waist. Some color is visible on the back of his armour.
- Makora (Makora): 170.1 cm, carries an axe in his right hand. His left hand rests on his waist. The hakama falls below the knees, covering his shin armour. The area around his neck is covered by a cloth.
- Kubira (Shōtora): 165.1 cm, has his right elbow raised to shoulder height, carrying a sword in his right hand. The tip of the sword is pointing at his left hand which is formed to a fist. Remains of a flower pattern are found on the skirt like garment (裙, kun), and the gold ground on the armour shows a pattern of small plates.
- Shōtora (Santera): 167.6 cm, his right hand with spread fingers resting on his waist and a sword in his left hand pointing down. His wild hair standing up is bound together in a topknot. One of his eyes is dark blue the other dark brown.
- Shintara (Shintara): 165.5 cm, holds a sacred gem in his right hand and a staff in his left hand. He is standing on a sandbar shaped dais (洲浜座, suhamaza). The shin armour features a flame pattern painted with ink on gold ground.
- Santera (Antera): 161.8 cm, is leaning on a trident with his right arm. His head is slightly turned to the left and his left hand rests on his waist. There is a shigami (獅噛) ornament of a biting lion on his shoulder armour. The posture is similar to that of Indara.
- Meikira (Indara): 159.5 cm, with his right hand resting on his waist and the left arm raised high with the palm turned outward. His left leg is bent. He is standing on a sandbar shaped dais (洲浜座, suhamaza).
- Antera (Bazara): 153.6 cm, wears a helmet with small curved panels on the left and right sides of the rim. He is carrying a fly swatter (hossu) in both hands in front of his left shoulder. His facial expression is peaceful.
- Indara (Haira): 155.2 cm, wears a helmet with two curved panels on the left and right sides of the rim and a visor. He carries a trident in his right hand while the left hand rests on his waist. The posture is similar to that of Santera.

== Trivia ==
Bazara of the group of Twelve Heavenly Generals was featured on a 500 yen postage stamp. In a collaboration between Shin-Yakushi-ji and the Department of Buddhism at Minobusan University, the whole group of Twelve Heavenly Generals was scanned in three dimensions in 2001 and 2002.

== See also ==
- List of National Treasures of Japan (temples)
- List of National Treasures of Japan (sculptures)
- Thirteen Buddhist Sites of Yamato
