= Nara City Historical Materials Preservation House =

Museum in Nara Prefecture, Japan

Historical Materials Preservation House
- 史料保存館
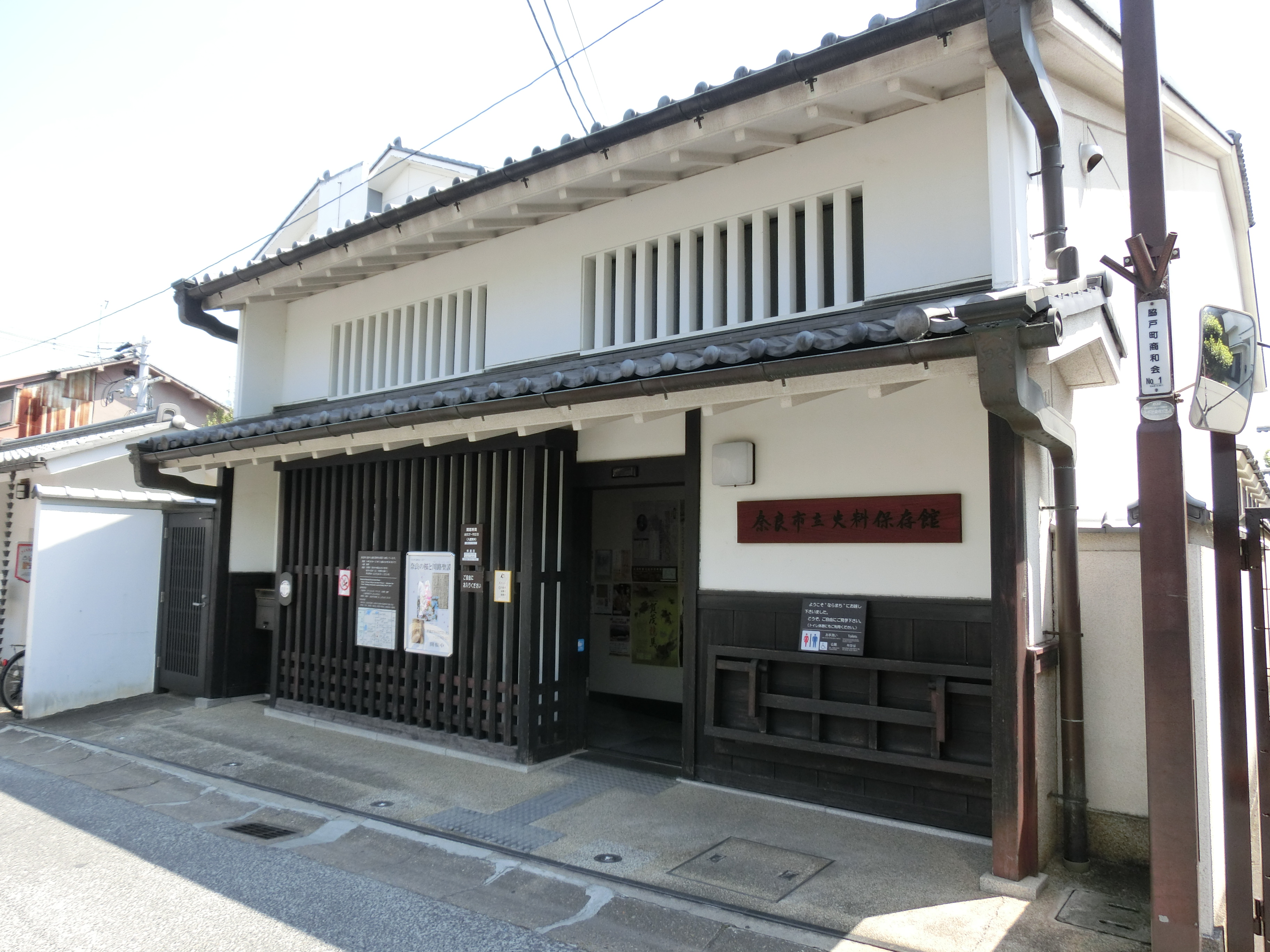
- Interactive map of the Historical Materials Preservation House area

General information
- Location: 1-1 Wakido-chō, Nara, Nara Prefecture, Japan
- Coordinates: 34°40′40″N 135°49′45″E
- Opened: 1993

Website
- Official website

The Historical Materials Preservation House (史料保存館, shiryō hozon kan) opened near Gangō-ji in Nara, Japan, in 1993. The facility investigates, preserves, and displays old documents and other historical materials relating to Naramachi (ならまち) and Nara City more generally, and the exhibitions change monthly. The large cornerstone in the courtyard is thought to be from the Gangō-ji shōrō.

== See also ==
- Nara National Museum
- List of Cultural Properties of Japan - historical materials (Nara)
- List of Historic Sites of Japan (Nara)
- Kyoto City Library of Historical Documents
