= Ikoma Cable Line =

Cable railway line in Nara, Japan

Coordinates: 34°41′12.4″N 135°41′23.9″E

Ikoma Cable Line (Ikoma Cable)

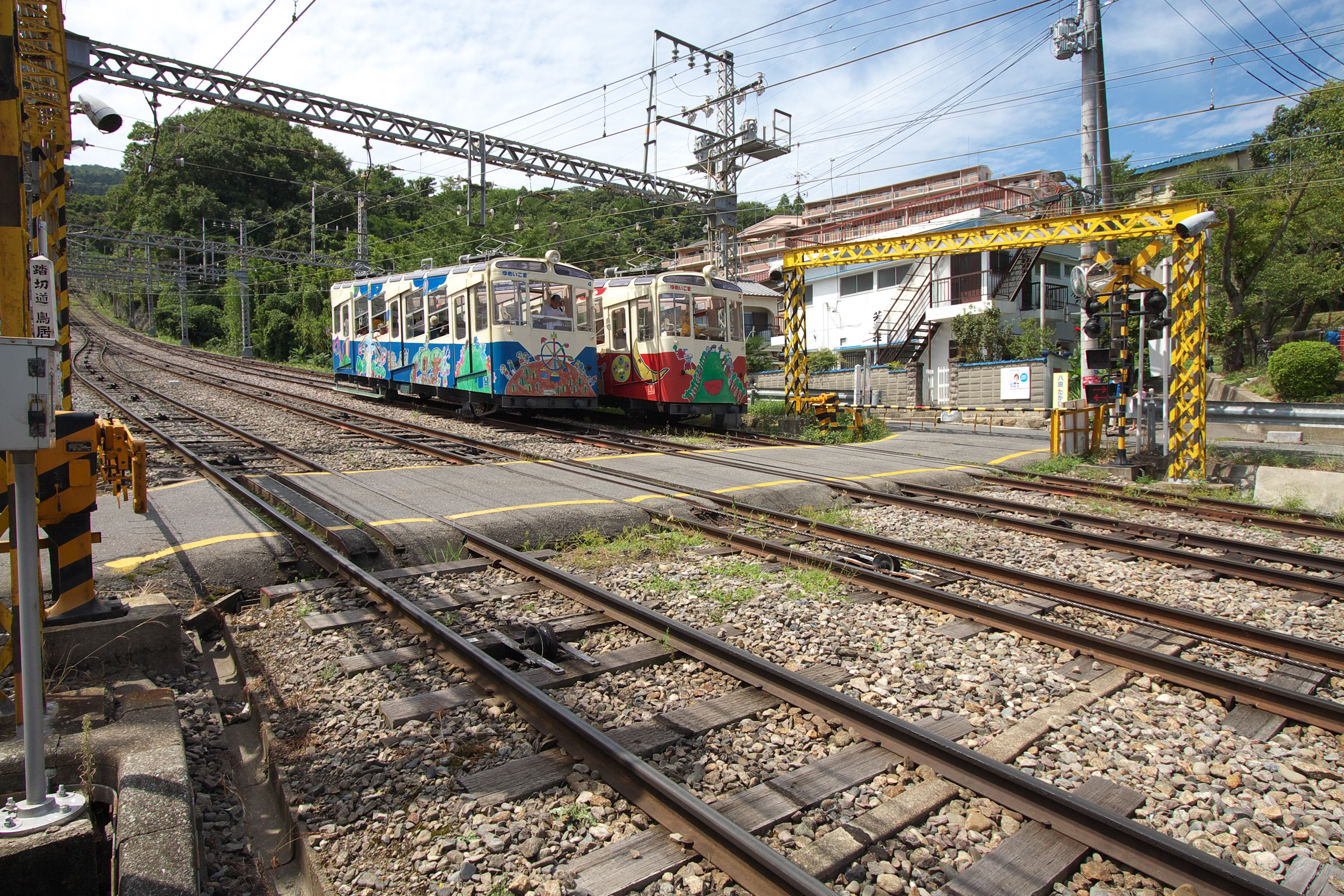
- Motorable level crossing at the passing loop of Hōzanji Line

Overview
- Native name: 生駒鋼索線 (生駒ケーブル)
- Owner: Kintetsu Railway
- Line number: Y
- Locale: Ikoma, Nara, Japan
- Termini: Toriimae; Ikomasanjo
- Stations: 5
- Color on map: (#B1865B)

Service
- Type: Cable railway
- System: Kintetsu Railway
- Operator: Kintetsu Railway

History
- Opened: August 29, 1918; 108 years ago

Technical
- Line length: 2 km (1.2 mi)
- Number of tracks: 4
- Character: Cable railway
- Track gauge: 1,067 mm (3 ft 6 in)
- Electrification: 200 V DC
- Operating speed: 10.8 km/h (6.7 mph)
- Maximum incline: Hōzanji Line: 22.7% Sanjō Line: 33.3%

The Ikoma Cable Line (生駒鋼索線, Ikoma kōsaku sen), referred to as Ikoma Cable (生駒ケーブル, Ikoma kēburu), is a cable railway line owned and operated by Kintetsu Railway, a Japanese major private railway. The line runs from Toriimae to Ikomasanjo and lies entirely within Ikoma, Nara, Japan.

== Overview ==
The Ikoma Cable Line is actually made up of two different lines; Hōzanji Line (宝山寺線, Hōzanji-sen) between Toriimae and Hōzanji, Sanjō Line (山上線, Sanjō-sen) between Hōzanji and Ikoma-Sanjō. The Hōzanji Line is the oldest commercially operated funicular in Japan, opened in 1918. It runs to Hōzan-ji, a Shingon Buddhist temple. Sanjō Line climbs up Mount Ikoma, reaching Ikoma Sanjo Amusement Park.

The Hōzanji Line is the only double-track funicular in the country. However, the two tracks are treated as different lines, called Hōzanji Line 1 (宝山寺1号線, Hōzanji Ichi-gō-sen) and Hōzanji Line 2 (宝山寺2号線, Hōzanji Ni-gō-sen). Normally, only Hōzanji Line 1 and Sanjō Line are used. Hōzanji Line 2 is operated in holiday seasons, and for safety inspections of the Line 1. Since the Hōzanji Line runs along a fairly urbanized area, it also functions as a commuter line. However, the line does not accept PiTaPa, a smart card ticketing system, nor Surutto Kansai, a prepaid magnetic card ticketing system.

In 2021, the line became a Civil Engineering heritage site.

== Rolling stock ==
Hōzanji Line 1 used classical 1928 cars until 2000, when they were replaced by the current fancy-decorated cars. Since then, bulldog-faced "Bull" and calico cat-faced "Mike" serve the line, both officially being Type Ko 11. Sanjō Line uses organ-like "Do-Re-Mi", cake-decorated "Sweet", both officially Type Ko 15. Hōzanji Line 2 uses ordinary-shaped Type Ko 3 cars, nicknamed "Yume-Ikoma".

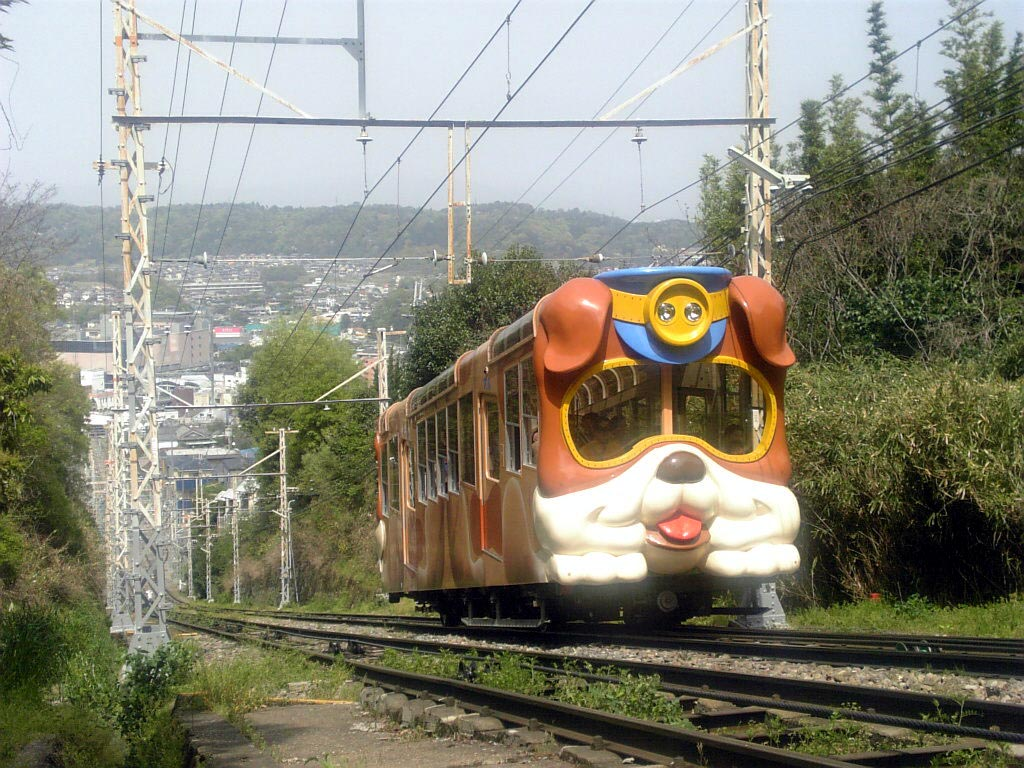
"Bull" of Hōzanji Line 1

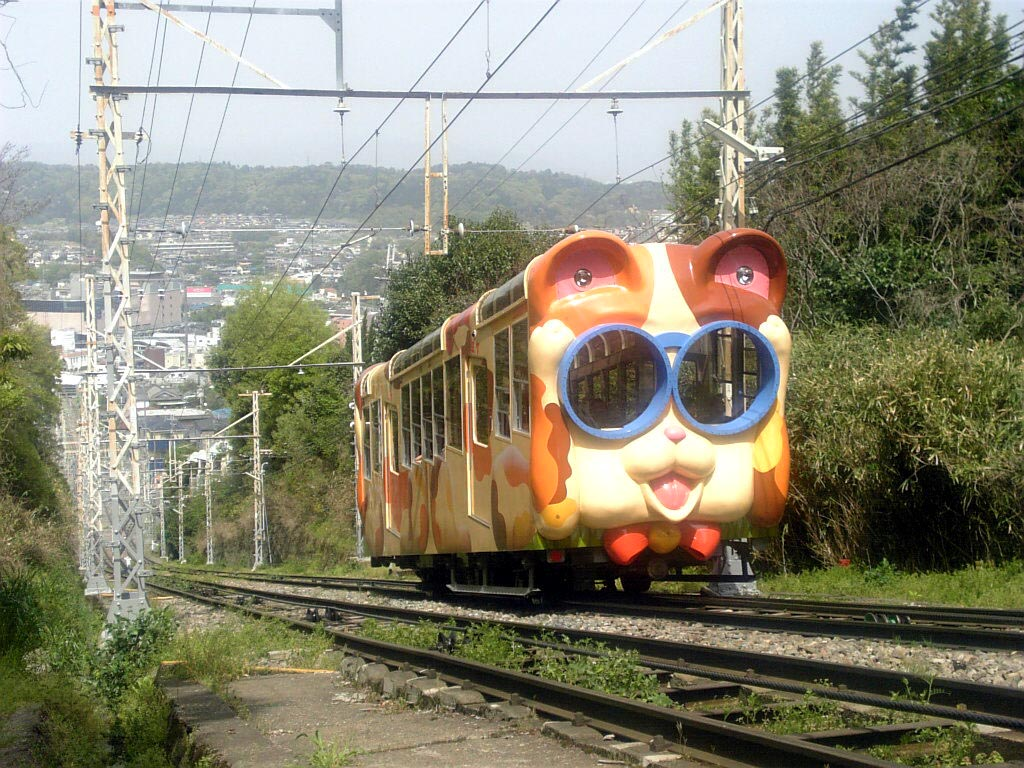
"Mike" of Hōzanji Line 1

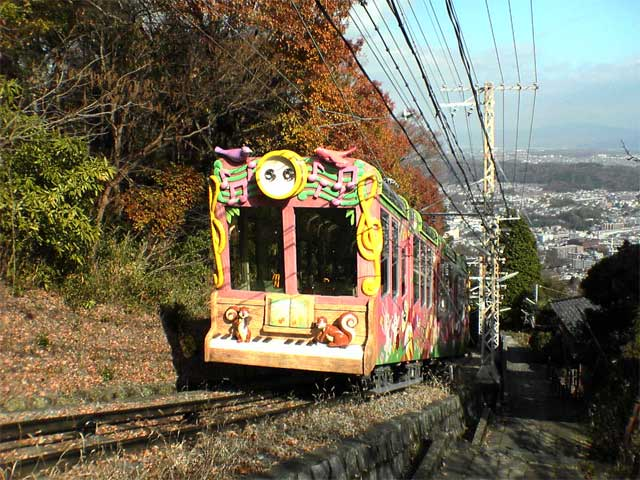
"Do-Re-Mi" of Sanjō Line

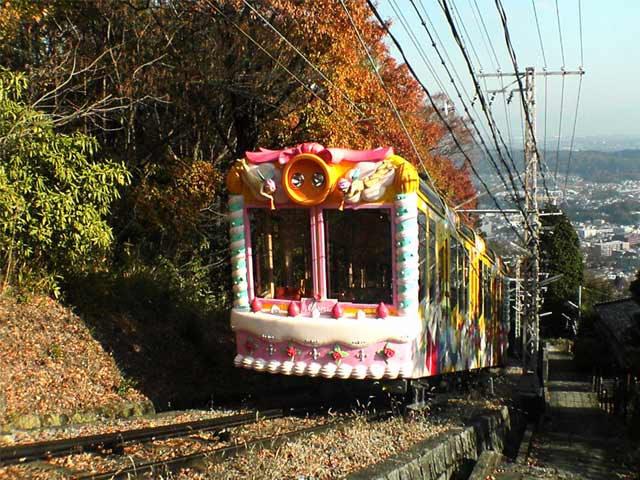
"Sweet" of Sanjō Line

== Stations ==
line name	No.	Station name	Japanese	Distance (km)	Direct	Transfers	Location	
Hōzanji; Line	Y17	Toriimae	鳥居前	0.0		A Nara Line (Ikoma) (A17); C Keihanna Line (Ikoma) (C27); G Ikoma Line (Ikoma) (G17)	Ikoma	Nara; Prefecture
Sanjō; Line	Y18	Hōzanji	宝山寺	0.9	●		Ikoma	Nara; Prefecture
Sanjō; Line	Y19	Umeyashiki	梅屋敷	1.2	|		Ikoma	Nara; Prefecture
Sanjō; Line	Y20	Kasumigaoka	霞ヶ丘	1.6	|		Ikoma	Nara; Prefecture
Sanjō; Line	Y21	Ikoma-Sanjō	生駒山上	2.0	●		Ikoma	Nara; Prefecture

== See also ==
- Cable car
- Funicular railway
- List of funicular railways
- List of railway lines in Japan
- Mt. Ikoma
