= Shigisan Gyokuzōin =

Buddhist temple in Japan

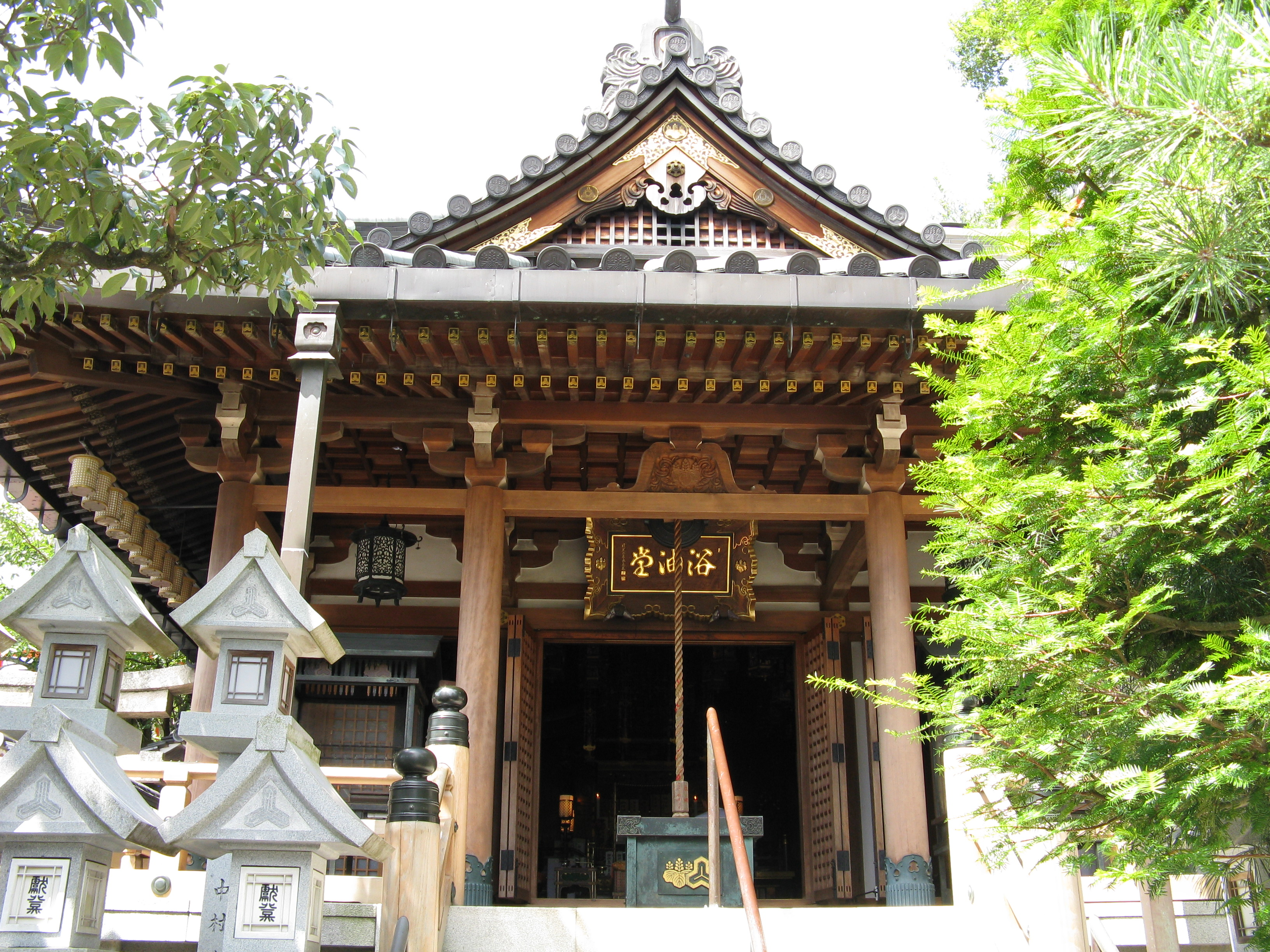

Shigisan Gyokuzōin (信貴山玉蔵院) is a Buddhist temple in Heguri, Nara Prefecture, Japan at Mount Shigi.

== See also ==
- Thirteen Buddhist Sites of Yamato
