= Bodhisena =

Indian Buddhist scholar and monk (704–760)

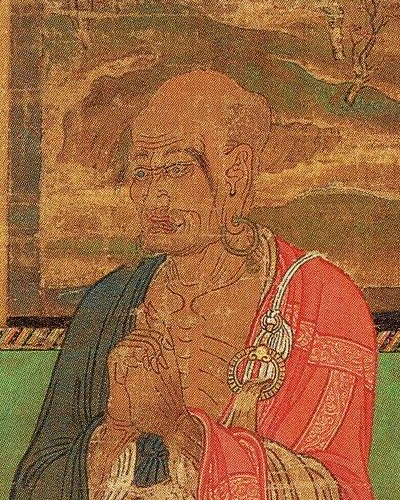
- Painting depicting Bodhisena, from the detail of 'Portrait of the Four Saints' (1377 AD)
- Born: 704 CE; Madurai, Tamil Nadu
- Died: 760 CE; Daian-ji, Japan
- Resting place: Ryoujusen Mountain
- Known for: Spreading Buddhism to Japan (華厳宗, Kegon-shū). Integrating and Legitimizing Buddhism in Japan under Emperor Shomu. Construction of the Todaiji temple in Nara.

Bodhisena or Bodaisenna (704–760 CE) was a Buddhist scholar and monk from India known for traveling to Japan and China and establishing the Kegon school, the Japanese transmission of the Huayan school of Chinese Buddhism. He is the first known Indian visitor to Japan.

His stay has been noted in the official history records called the Shoku Nihongi, where he is referred to as Bodai-Senna.

== Early years ==
Bodhisena was born in Madurai, Tamil Nadu around 704 AD. He got mystical inspiration from Manjusri Bodhisattva. He initially went to China, having heard that he could meet the incarnation of Mañjuśrī at Mount Wutai. However, on reaching Mount Wutai, he was told the incarnation was in Japan. While in China, Bodhisena met a Japanese ambassador. The ambassador invited him to Japan on behalf of Emperor Shomu (701-756 AD), who was a devoted Buddhist. He also became acquainted with the tenth Japanese ambassador to China, Tajihi no Mabito Hironari. He also met the Japanese monk Rikyo.

== Voyage to Japan ==
On the invitation of Emperor Shōmu, he visited Nara era Japan to establish Huayan Buddhism in the country. He traveled with the Japanese delegation of Tajihi no Hironari, via Cambodia and Champa

On the same ship were other important historical figures.

They included the traveling companions Genbō and Kibi no Makibi. Genbo was a monk and was returning from China with the over 5,000 fascicles that made up the Chinese Buddhist Canon. Kibi brought with him the arts of embroidery, playing the lyre, and the game of Go.

== Life in Japan ==
The party arrived at Naniwa (Osaka) in August 736 and was met by the monk Gyoki.

According to a number of sources, Gyoki and Bodhisena recognised each other from a past life. According to the Shūi Wakashū, quoting from the Tōdaiji Yōroku, Gyoki stated that they were together at Vulture Peak when the Buddha preached the Lotus Sutra. Bodhisena, called the "Baramon Sojo" (Brahmin Priest), additionally refers to them being together at Kapilavastu. He also recognised Gyoki as the rebirth of the bodhisattva Mañjuśrī he was seeking. Their exchange is recorded thus:

Gyoki:

On the Holy Mount,
In the presence of Sakya,
The self consistent
Truth we swore has not decayed:
I have met with you again!

Baramon Sojo in reply:

The vow we swore
Together at Kapilavastu
Has borne fruit:
For the face of Manjusri
I have seen again today!

Gyoki conducted Bodhisena to Nara and presented him to the emperor. He was treated with great honour and lodged in the temple called Daian-ji, where he founded Kegon Buddhism and also taught Sanskrit.

In 752, Emperor Shōmu asked him to perform the eye-opening ceremony for the giant bronze statue of the Buddha Vairocana built in Tōdai-ji. Dosen also played a significant role. The painting of the eyes was done by Bodhisena.

After a visit to Mount Tomi (Nara), Bodhisena petitioned the emperor to name the prayer hall there Ryōsen-ji (霊山寺), as he found the place to strongly resemble the mountain in India where the Buddha preached, known as Vulture Peak, or Ryoujusen (霊鷲山) in Japanese.

Bodhisena resided in Daian-ji (大安寺) in Heijō-kyō for the rest of his life. He died on 25 February 760 at Daian-ji temple, and was buried on the Ryoujusen (霊鷲山) mountain, following his wish when he died.

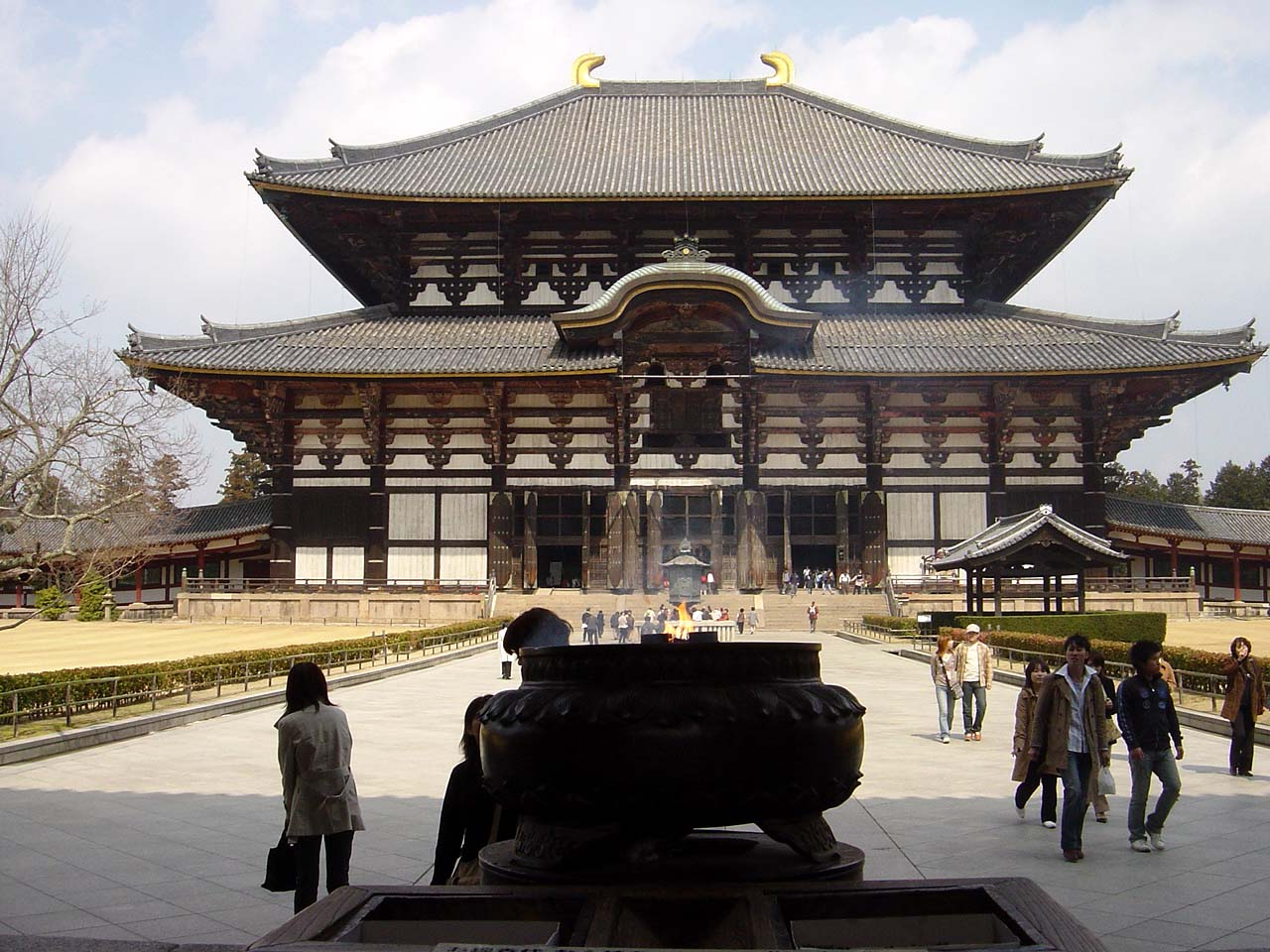
Tōdai-ji temple, Nara, Japan

== Legacy ==
Japan's traditional court dance and music still preserve some of the forms introduced by Bodhisena into Japan.

The forty-seven characters of the Japanese script are said to have been devised after the pattern of the Sanskrit alphabet by the Japanese Buddhist Kobo Daishi (774-835 AD). The arrangement of the Japanese syllabary based on the Sanskrit system is also attributed to the influence of Bodhisena in Japan, which, according to Riri Nakayama, "will continue as long as the Japanese language continues to exist".

== See also ==
- Tōdai-ji
- Heijō-kyō
