= Ikoma-Sanjō Station =

Funicular station in Ikoma, Nara Prefecture, Japan

Ikoma-Sanjō Station 生駒山上駅
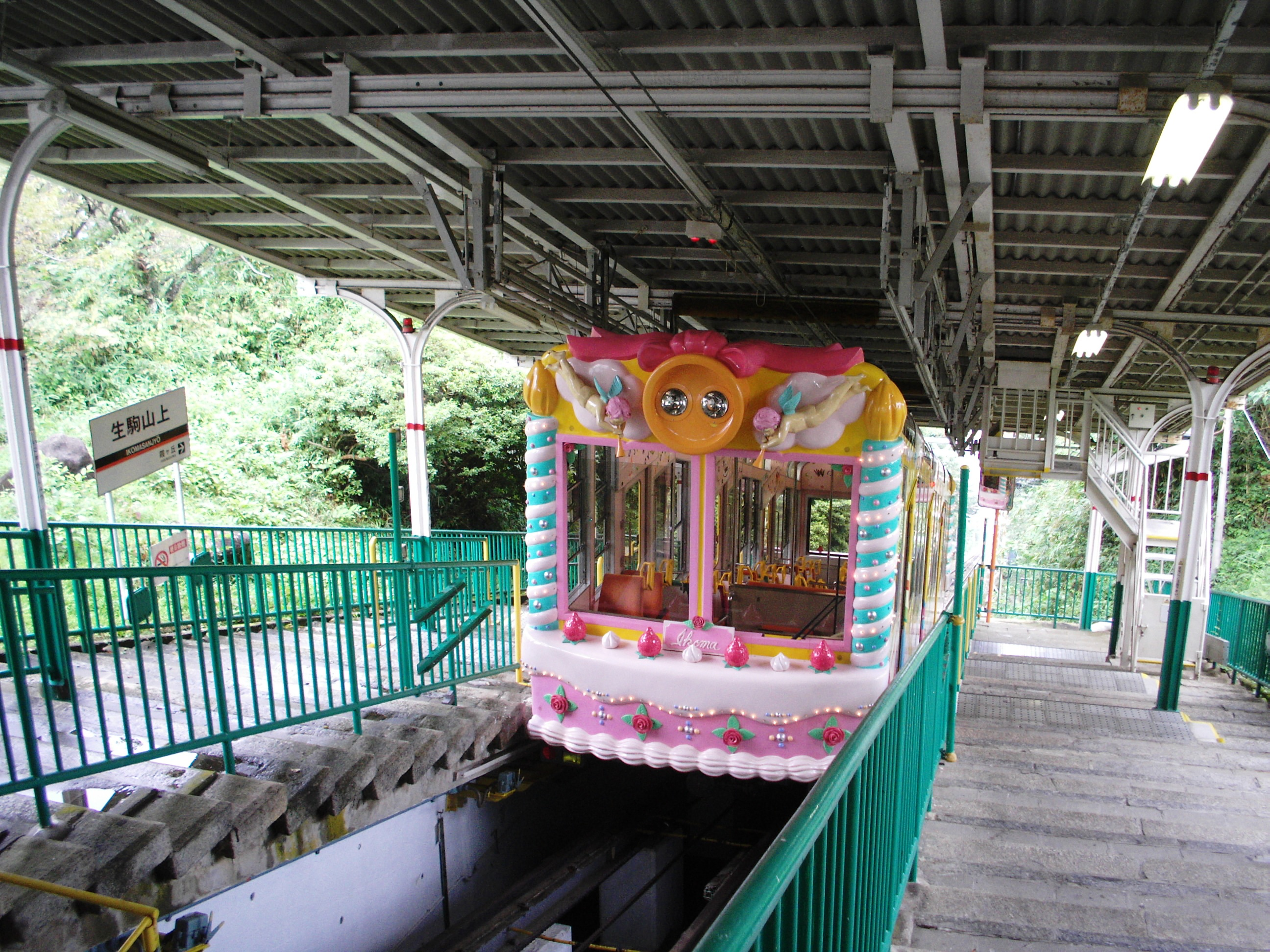
- platform

General information
- Location: 2312-51, Nabata-chō, Ikoma, Nara 630-0231 （奈良県生駒市菜畑町2312-51） Japan
- Coordinates: 34°40′46″N 135°40′50″E
- Operator: Kintetsu Railway
- Line: Ikoma Cable Line
- Connections

Other information
- Station code: Y21

History
- Opened: 27 March 1929
Location

Ikoma-Sanjō Station (生駒山上駅, Ikoma-Sanjō-eki) is a funicular station in Ikoma, Nara Prefecture, Japan.

== Line ==
- ■ Kintetsu Ikoma Cable Line (Y21)

== Layout ==
Passengers can get on and off a cable car only to and from the right side of the direction for Hozanji in regular operations. The opposite platform is usually closed.

■ Ikoma Cable Line	for Hozanji

== Surroundings ==
This station is next to Ikoma Sanjo Amusement Park. The TV masts of Osaka's TV stations (MBS, ABC, TV Osaka, Kansai TV, Yomiuri TV) and the radio masts of business radio are located on the ridge of Mount Ikoma.

== Adjacent stations ==
«	Service	»
Kintetsu Ikoma Cable Line (Y21)
Kasumigaoka (Y20)	-	Terminus
