= Gyōki =

Japanese Buddhist priest (668–749)

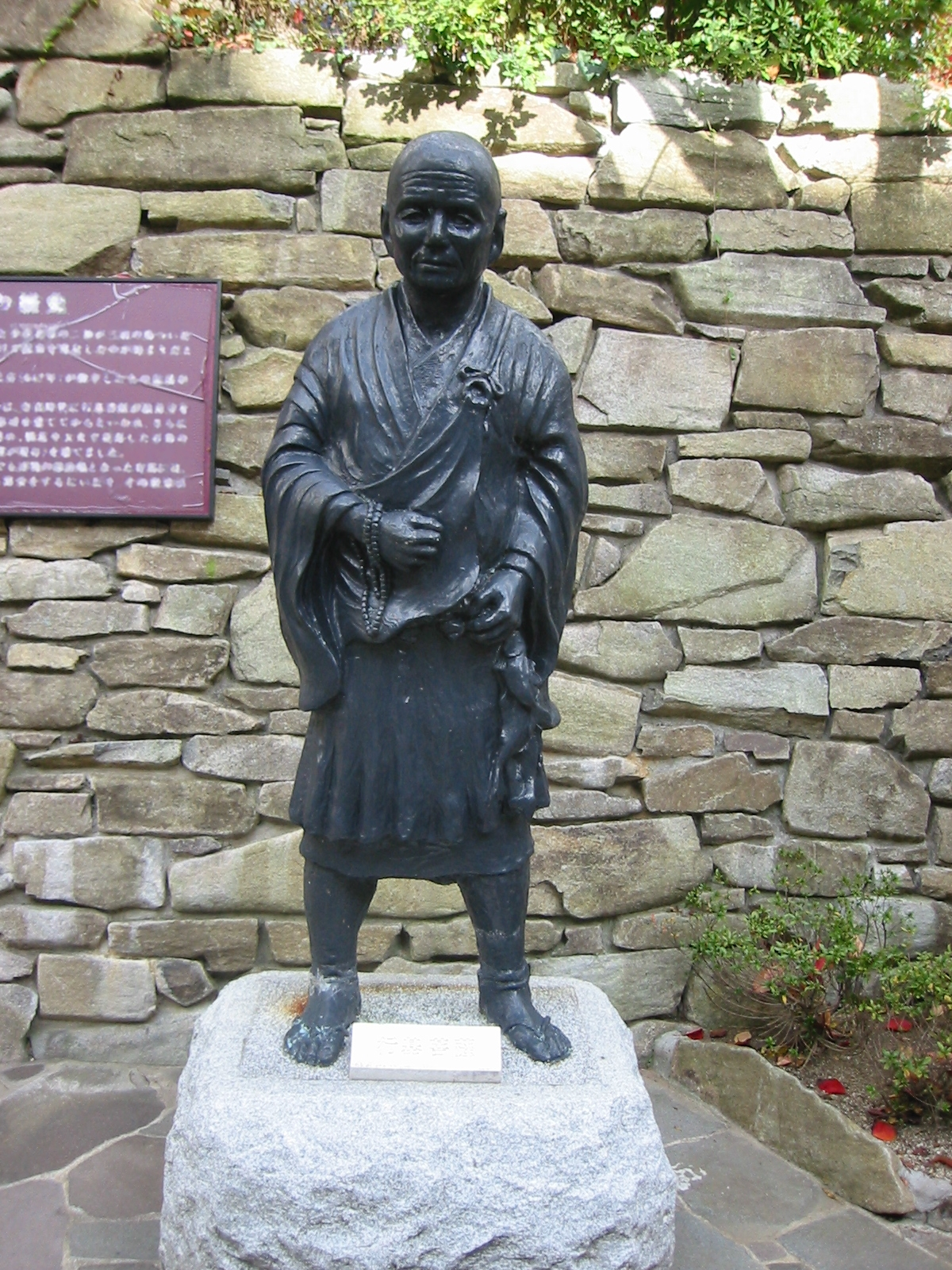
Statue of Gyōki, Kobe, Japan

Gyōki (行基; 668–749) was a Japanese Buddhist priest of the Nara period, born in Ōtori county, Kawachi Province (now Sakai, Osaka), the son of Koshi no Saichi. According to one theory, one of his ancestors was of Korean descent.

Gyōki became a monk at Asuka-dera, a temple in Nara, at the age of 15 and studied under Dōshō as one of his first pupils. Gyōki studied Yogachara (唯識), a core doctrine of Hosso, at Yakushi-ji. In 704, he returned to his birthplace to make his home into a temple, then started to travel around Japan to preach to commoners and help the poor. He formed a volunteer group to help the poor mainly in the Kansai region, building 49 monasteries and nunneries that also functioned as hospitals for the poor. Gyōki and his followers roamed the countryside, teaching common people about Buddhism, building temples that were more like community centers and organizing irrigation and other public works projects.

Since regulations at the time strictly prohibited activities by priests outside their monastic compounds, his travelling around the country made him a non-official, private priest, not registered through the Office of Priestly Affairs (僧綱, Sōgō). Gyōki and his followers were persecuted by the government, but his popularity and his administrative skill in public works later earned him a pardon. In 745 he became the first priest to be given the rank of Daisōjō.

== Gyōki-zu maps ==
Gyōki is widely recognized as the founder of mapping in Japan. According to a 14th-century Tendai source, he helped to determine boundaries by drawing the shape of the country as a one-pointed vajra (the vajra is a symbol for both a thunderbolt and a diamond). Gyōki is also often considered Japan’s first civil engineer, as he paved the way for infrastructure and the creation of places of worship.

"Even though no proof exists that Gyogi ever made a map himself, the term 'Gyogi-type maps' has come to be applied to early provincial maps he inspired. ... Their most notable feature ... was the way in which they depicted the provinces in balloon shapes (round or oval) clustered around Kyoto, the capital. The main purpose of Gyogi-type maps seems to have been to show the relationships of the provinces with one another and the capital."

"A scheme of outline loops showing land ownership and boundaries, with South generally at the top, characterized this form of map-making, a response to the government's need for feudal information. Examples of such estate surveys surviving from the Nara period in the eighth century (named after the ancient Japanese capital city). They are legible and informative, but unrelated to other aspects of accuracy. Although none of Gyogi's own maps survive today, cadastral maps in his style still exist in the Shosoin, an imperial archive from that time, and are shown occasionally in the city of Nara. The Gyogi style represented loyalty to a valid tradition. These schematic loops of information, rather than realistic shapes, continued well into the nineteenth century, as did the complex Buddhist world maps, which were also unrelated to knowledge of the world's shapes of land and sea, but rather, maps of a spiritual landscape."

During the construction of Tōdai-ji, the major temple in Nara, the government recruited Gyōki and his fellow ubasoku (lay Buddhist) monks to organize labor and resources from the countryside. He also oversaw the creation of several ponds around the temple.

He died on February 2, 749, at the age of 80, and was buried at Chikurin-ji, a temple now in Ikoma, Nara. The Imperial Court in Kyoto posthumously granted him the title of Bosatsu in 751, so in Japan he is often referred to as Gyōki Bosatsu.

== See also ==
- Bodhisena
- Inoue Kaoru (井上薫) - a scholar who specialized in the study of Gyōki.
