= Hōzan-ji =

Buddhist temple in Ikoma, Nara Prefecture, Japan

Hōzan-ji 宝山寺
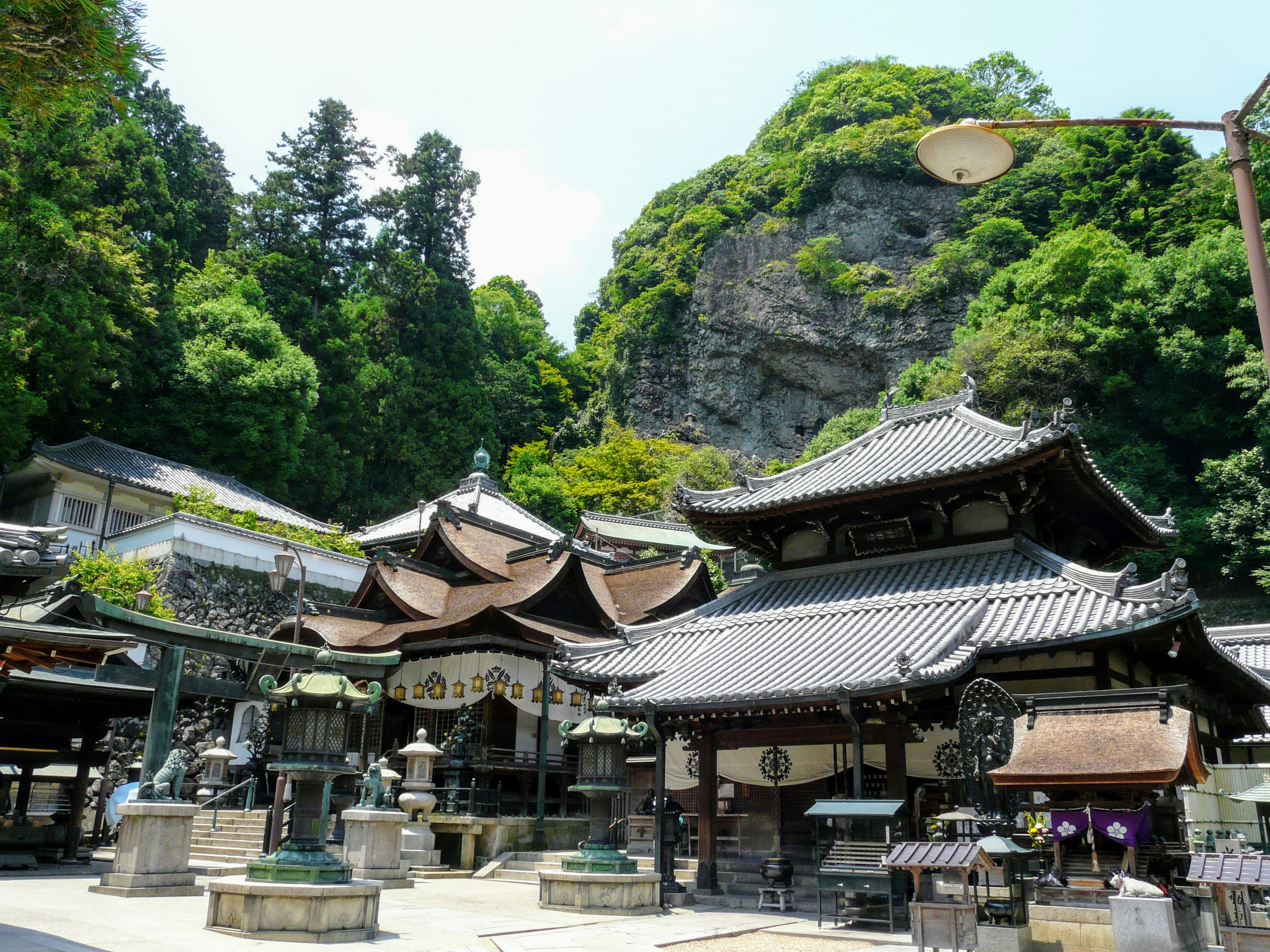
- Main hall (right) and grounds

Religion
- Affiliation: Shingon Ritsu
- Deity: Fudō Myō-ō (Acala)
- Status: Head temple

Location
- Location: 1-1 Monzen-chō, Ikoma, Nara Prefecture 630-0266
- Country: Japan
- Interactive map of Hōzan-ji 宝山寺
- Coordinates: 34°41′4.8″N 135°41′11.6″E

Architecture
- Founder: Tankai
- Completed: 1678

Website
- http://www.hozanji.com/ (Japanese)

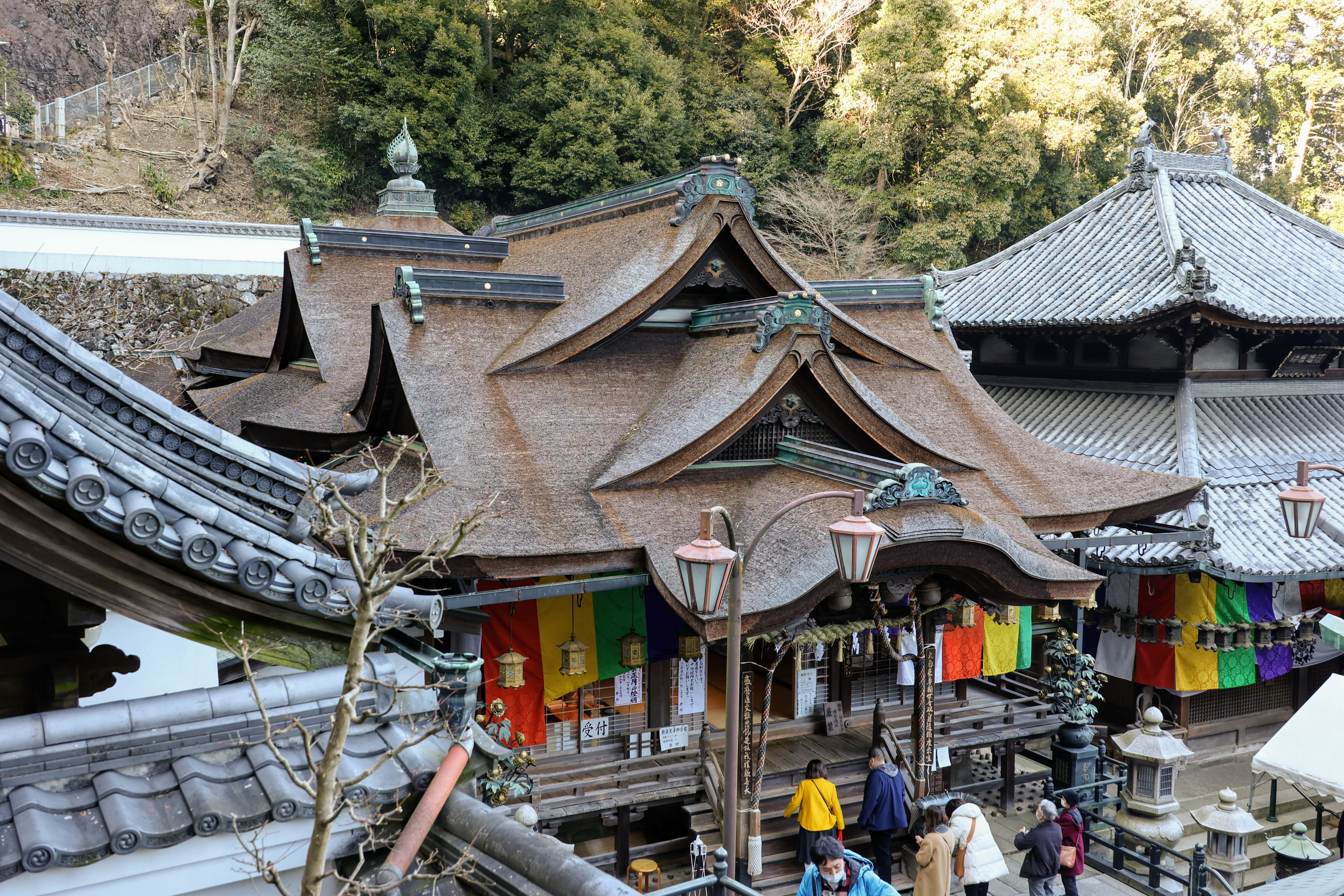
Hall for Kangiten (Shoten)

Hōzan-ji (宝山寺) is a Buddhist temple in Monzen-machi, Ikoma, Nara, Japan.

Though officially dedicated to the deity Acala (Fudō Myōō), the temple serves as a cult-center of the deity Kangiten (Shoten) and is also called 'Ikoma-Shōten' (生駒聖天).

== History ==
The area around Hōzan-ji was originally a place for the training of Buddhist monks. The name of the place at that time was Daishō-Mudō-ji (大聖無動寺).

Mount Ikoma was originally an object of worship for the ancient people in the region, and so this area was selected as a place for religious training. The training area is said to have opened in 655 by En no Gyōja. Many Buddhist monks, including Kūkai (空海), are said to have trained here.

Hozan-ji started when Tankai (湛海) reopened this training area in the 17th century. Tankai set up a statue of Kangiten (Shoten) here in 1678, the official year Hozan-ji was established.

In the Edo period, Hozan-ji was one of the most popular Buddhist temples in this region.

== Cultural properties ==
This temple has Important Cultural Properties selected by the Japanese government.

- Shishi-Kaku Building (獅子閣)
- Five statues of Zushiiri-Mokuzo-Godai-Myōō (厨子入木造五大明王像)
- Kenpon-Chosyoku-Kasuga-Mandara-zu (絹本著色春日曼荼羅図)
- Kenpon-Choshoku-Aizen-Myōō (絹本著色愛染明王像)
- Kenpon-Choshoku-Miroku-Bosatsu (絹本著色弥勒菩薩像)
- Five volumes of No-hon, written by Zeami (世阿弥能本)

== Access ==
- Hōzanji Station of Ikoma Cable Line
- Umeyashiki Station of Ikoma Cable Line

== Gallery ==
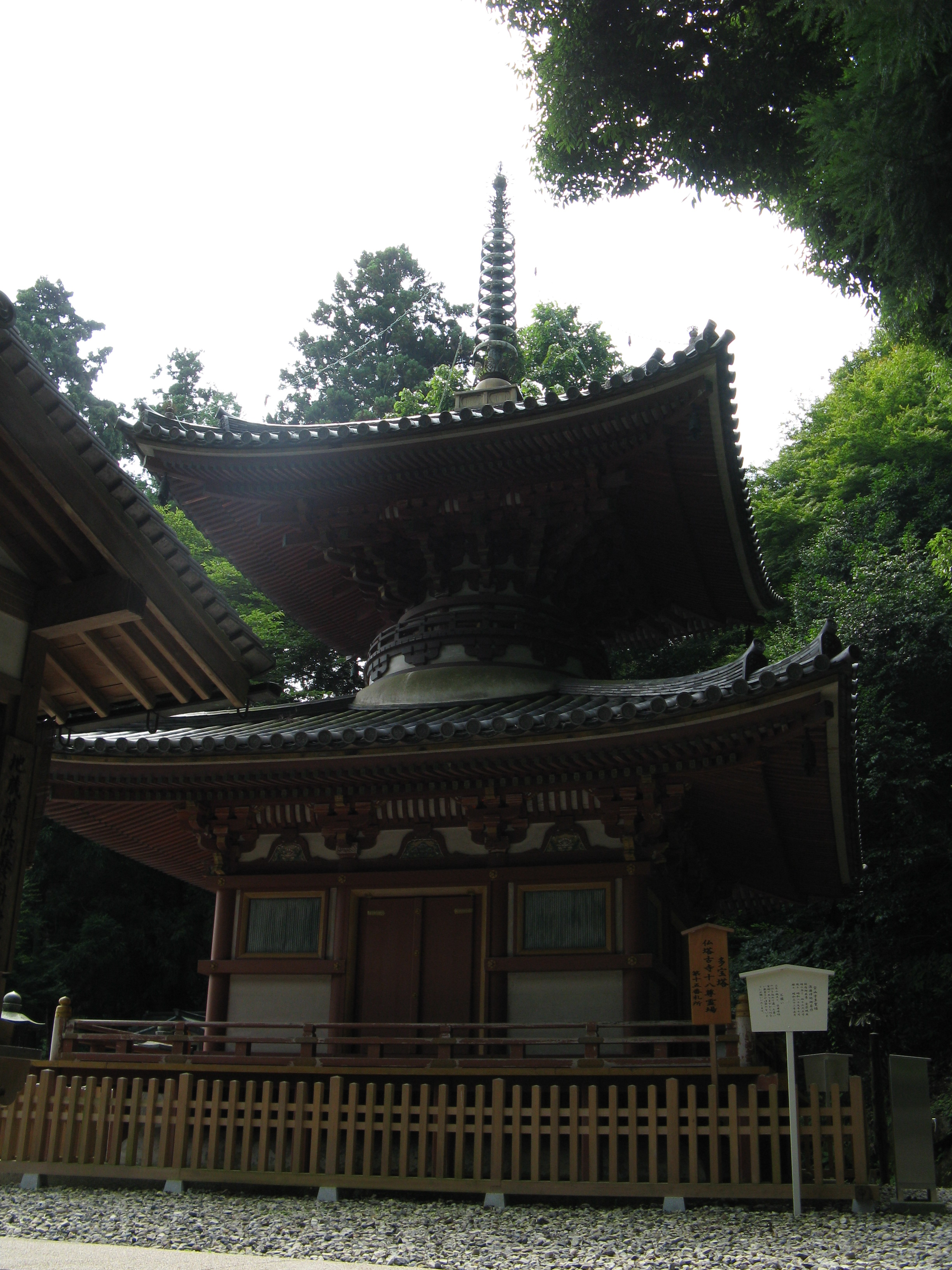

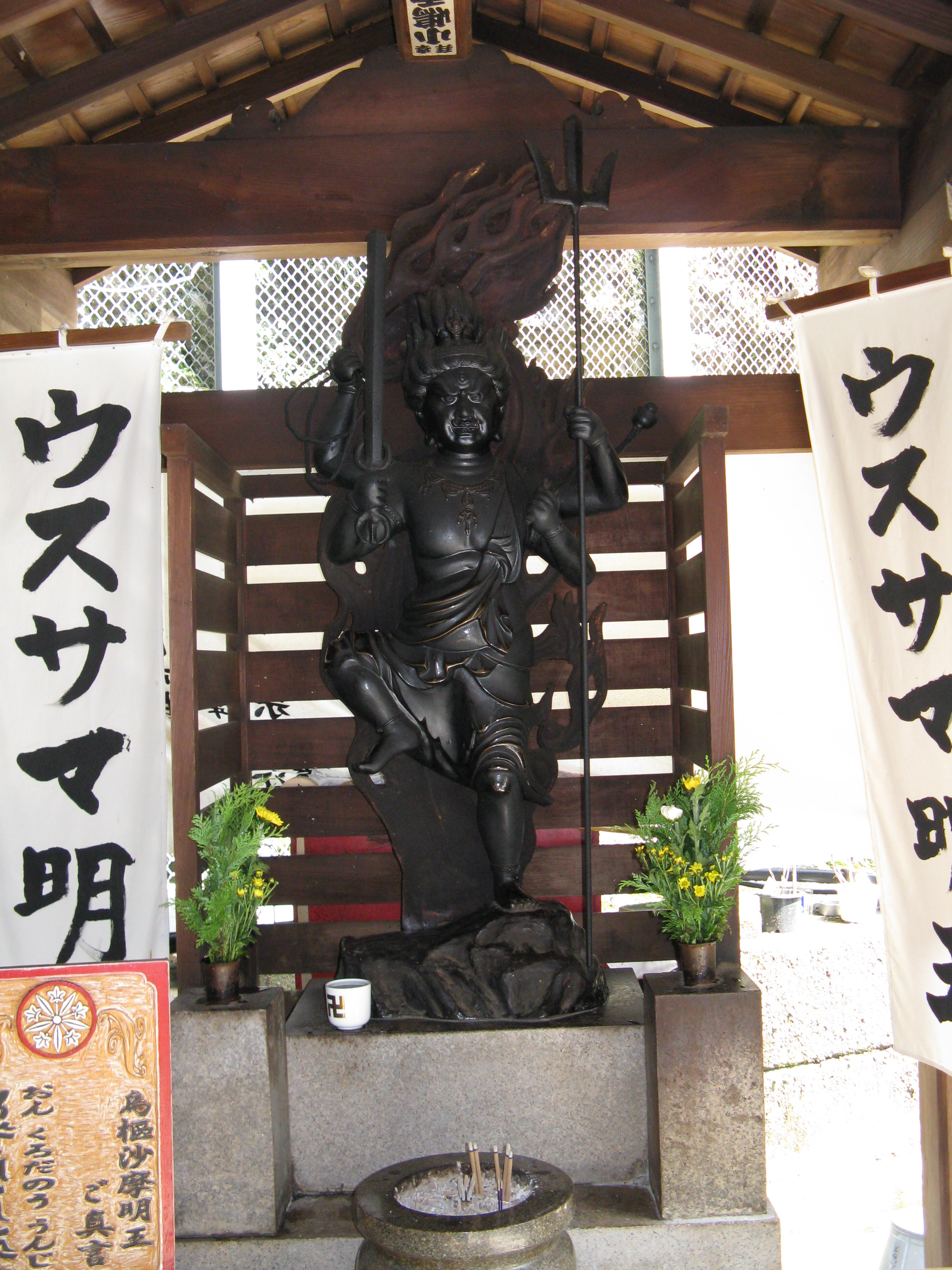
Ucchusma

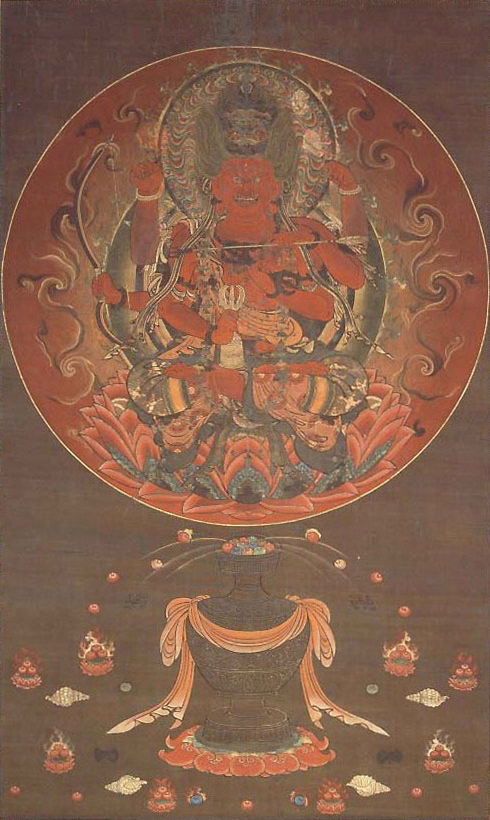
Rāgarāja

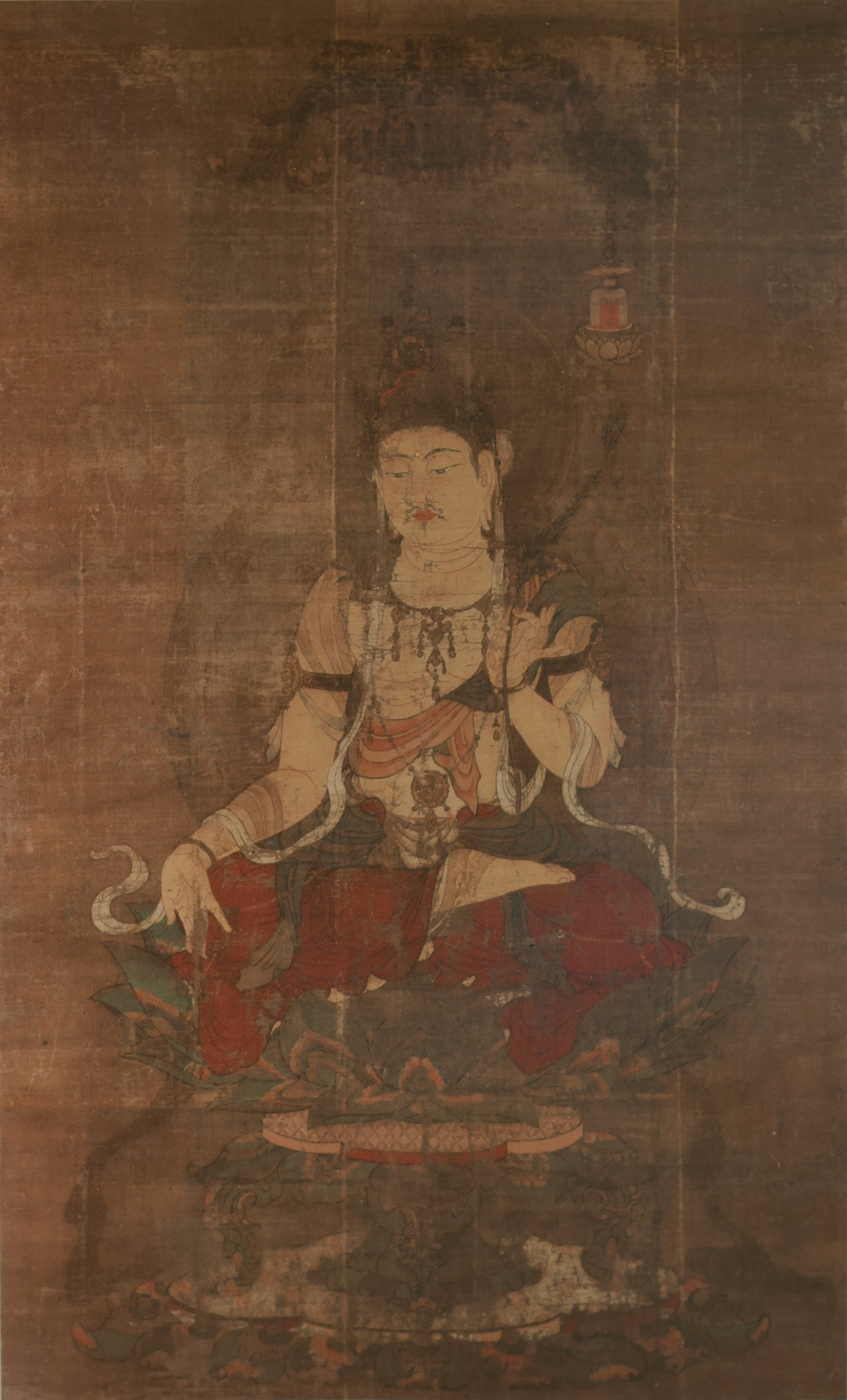
Maitreya

== See also ==
- Thirteen Buddhist Sites of Yamato
