= Shigisanshita Station =

Railway station in Sangō, Nara Prefecture, Japan

Shigisanshita Station 信貴山下駅
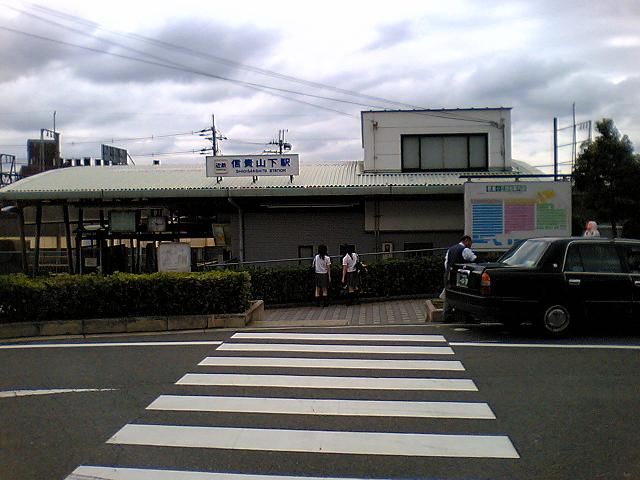
- Shigisanshita Station

General information
- Location: 1-4-1, Seyanishi, Sangō, Ikoma District, Nara （奈良県生駒郡三郷町勢野西一丁目4-1） Japan
- Coordinates: 34°36′04″N 135°41′42″E
- System: Kintetsu Railway commuter rail station
- Owner: Kintetsu Railway
- Operator: Kintetsu Railway
- Line: G Ikoma Line
- Distance: 0.9 km (0.56 miles) from Ōji
- Platforms: 2 side platforms
- Tracks: 2
- Train operators: Kintetsu Railway
- Connections: None

Construction
- Structure type: At grade
- Parking: None
- Cycle facilities: Available
- Accessible: Yes

Other information
- Station code: G27
- Website: Official website

History
- Opened: 26 May 1922
- Former names: Yamashita (to 1951); Shigisanguchi (to 1956)

Passengers
- 2019: 1359 daily

Services
Preceding station	Kintetsu Railway	Following station
Seya-Kitaguchi towards Ikoma	Ikoma Line	Ōji Terminus
Location
- Location within Nara Prefecture Location within Japan

Shigisanshita Station (信貴山下駅, Shigisanshita-eki) is a passenger railway station located in the town of Sangō, Nara Prefecture, Japan. It is operated by the private transportation company, Kintetsu Railway.

== Line ==
Shigisanshita Station is served by the Ikoma Line and is 0.9 kilometers from the starting point of the line at Ōji

== Layout ==
The station is a ground-level station with two opposing side platforms and two tracks, allowing trains to pass each other. The effective length of the platform is for four cars. The station building (ticket gate) is on the platform 2 side, and is connected to platform 1 on the opposite side by an underground passage, but there are no elevators or other barrier-free facilities.The station is unattended.

== Platforms ==
1	■ Ikoma Line	for Ōji
2	■ Ikoma Line	for Ikoma

== History ==
Shigisanshita Station opened on 16 May 1922 as Yamashita Station (山下駅) when the Shigi-Ikoma Electric Railroad was extended from Ōji. The cable line (later the Higashi Shigi Cable Line) also opened. The line was further extended to Motosanjōguchi on 21 October 1926. On 10 September 1951 it was renamed Shigisanguchi Station (信貴山口駅), which was then changed to its present name on 10 September 1956. The Shigi-Ikoma Electric Railroad was merged with the Kintetsu Railway on 1 October 1964. On 1 September 1983 the Higashi-Shingi Cable Line was abolished.

== Passenger statistics ==
In fiscal 2019, the station was used by an average of 1359 passengers daily (boarding passengers only).

== Surrounding area ==
- Sangō Town Office
- Tatsuta Shrine
- Mount Shigi Chōgosonshiji Temple
- Nara Sangyo University Shigisan Ground

== See also ==
- List of railway stations in Japan
