= Heguri Station =

Railway station in Heguri, Nara Prefecture, Japan

Heguri Station 平群駅
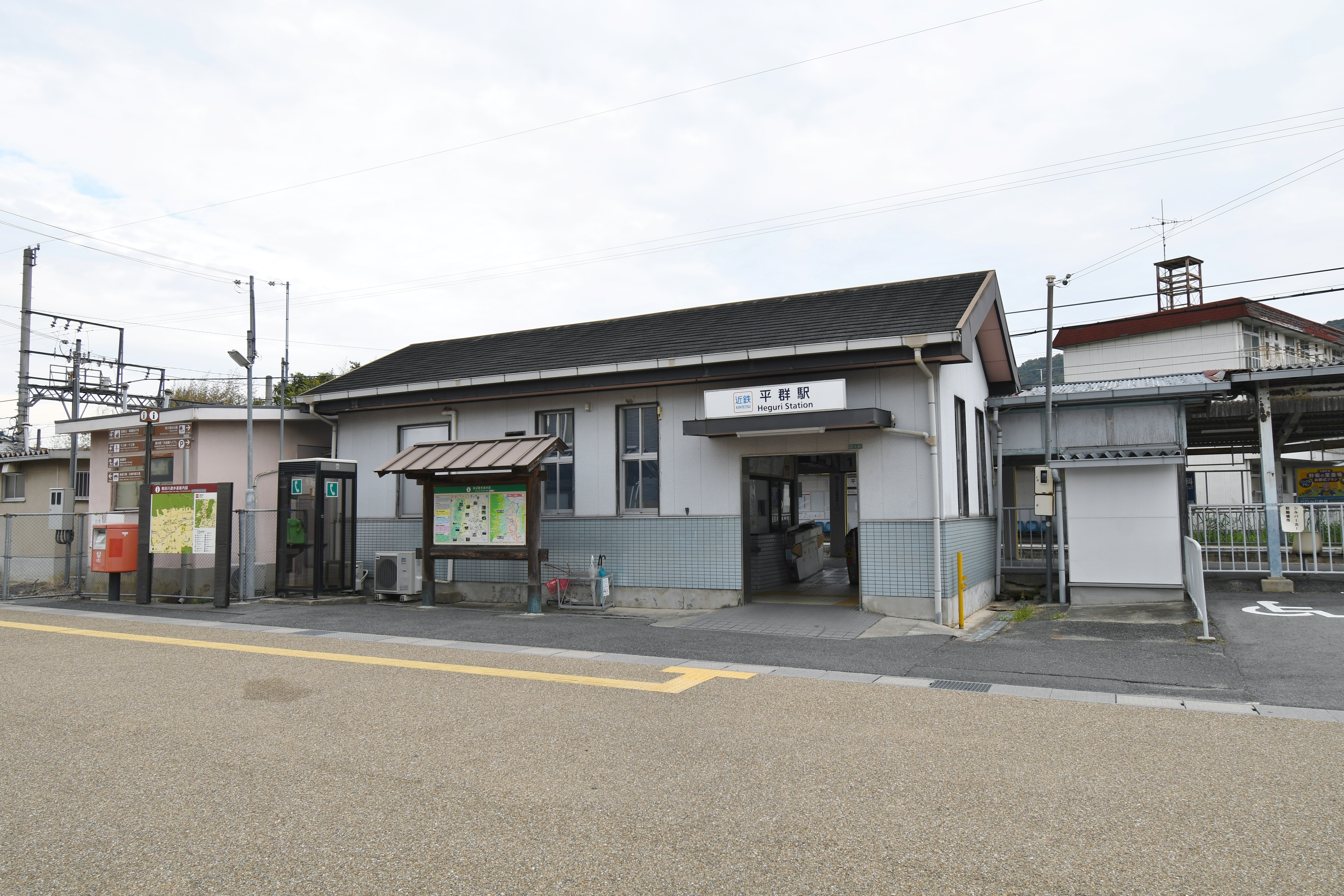
- Heguri Station in 2023

General information
- Location: 4-3-32, Yoshishin, Heguri, Ikoma District, Nara （奈良県生駒郡平群町吉新四丁目3-32） Japan
- Coordinates: 34°37′45″N 135°42′16″E
- System: Kintetsu Railway commuter rail station
- Owner: Kintetsu Railway
- Operator: Kintetsu Railway
- Line: G Ikoma Line
- Distance: 4.5 km (2.8 miles) from Ōji
- Platforms: 2 side platforms
- Tracks: 2
- Train operators: Kintetsu Railway
- Connections

Other information
- Station code: G24
- Website: www.kintetsu.co.jp/station/station_info/station11009.html

History
- Opened: 21 October 1926

Passengers
- FY2019: 1721 daily

Services
Preceding station	Kintetsu Railway	Following station
Motosanjoguchi towards Ikoma	Ikoma Line Local	Tatsutagawa towards Ōji
Location

Heguri Station (平群駅, Heguri-eki) is a passenger railway station located in the town of Heguri, Ikoma District, Nara Prefecture, Japan. It is operated by the private transportation company, Kintetsu Railway.

== Line ==
Tatsutagawa Station is served by the Ikoma Line and is 4.5 kilometers from the starting point of the line at Ōji.

== Layout ==
The stationis a ground-level station with two opposed side platforms. The station building is on the platform 2 side, and is connected to platform 1 on the opposite side by a level crossing The effective length of the platform is for four cars. The station is unattended.

== Platforms ==
1	■ G Ikoma Line	for Ōji
2	■ G Ikoma Line	for Ikoma

== History ==
Heguri Station was opened 21 October 1926 on the Shigiikoma Electric Railway. It was raised o a permanent station on 19 December 1930. It became a Kintetsu Railway station due to a company merger on 1 October 1963.

== Passenger statistics ==
In fiscal 2019 the station was used by an average of 1721 passengers daily (boarding passengers only).

== Surrounding area ==
- Heguri Town Office
- National Route 168
- Tomb of Prince Nagaya

== See also ==
- List of railway stations in Japan
