= Tatsutagawa =

Tatsutagawa may refer to:

- Tatsutagawa stable, a defunct stable of sumo wrestlers
- Hōchiyama Kōkan, sumo wrestler and holder of the elder name Tatsutagawa
- Tatsutagawa Station, a railway station in Heguri, Nara, Japan
