= Motosanjōguchi Station =

Railway station in Heguri, Nara Prefecture, Japan

Motosanjōguchi Station 元山上口駅
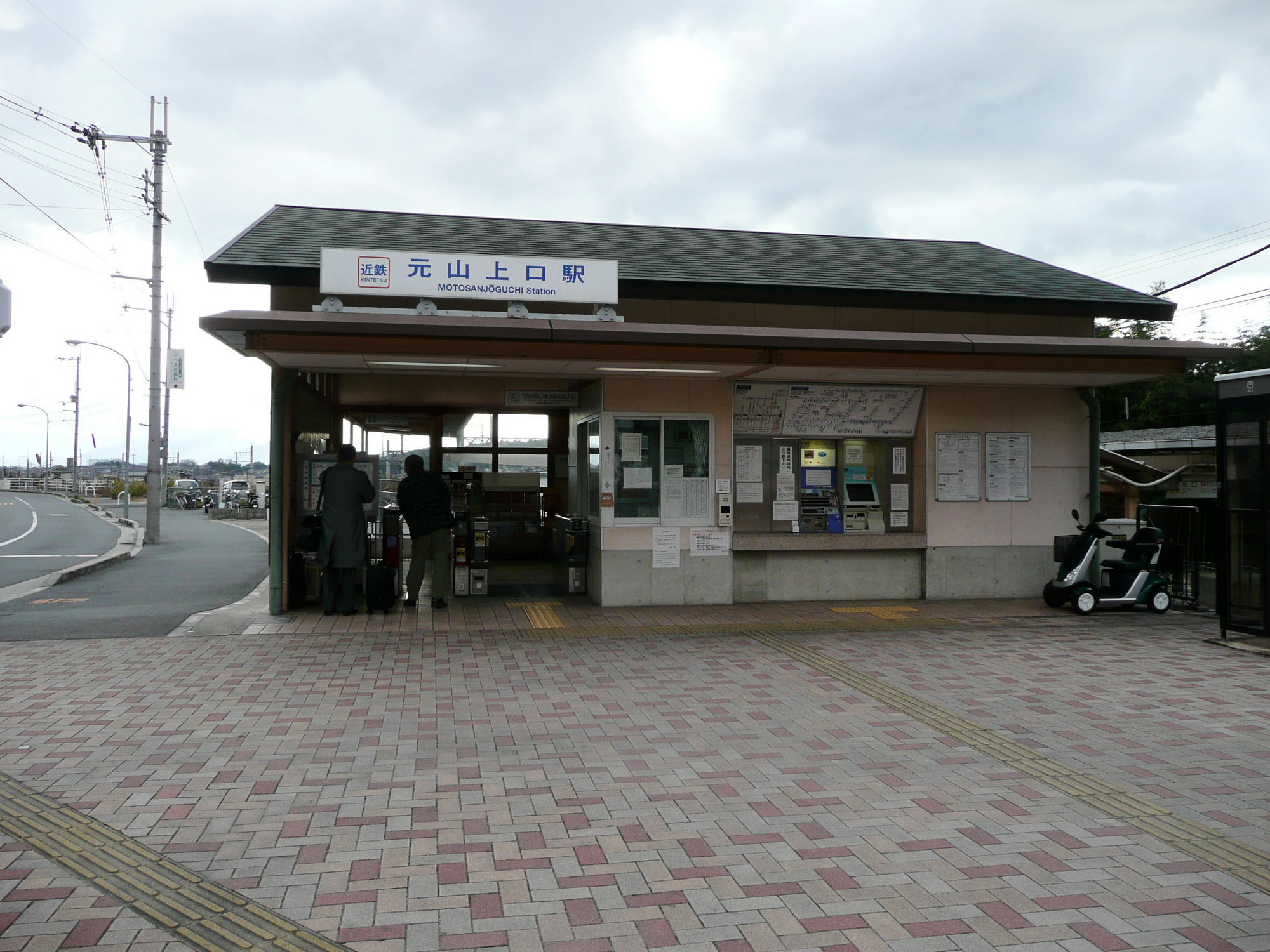
- Station building

General information
- Location: 802, Shidehara, Heguri, Ikoma District, Nara （奈良県生駒郡平群町椣原802） Japan
- Coordinates: 34°38′25″N 135°42′03″E
- System: Kintetsu Railway commuter rail station
- Owner: Kintetsu Railway
- Operator: Kintetsu Railway
- Line: G Ikoma Line
- Distance: 5.7 km (3.5 miles) from Ōji
- Platforms: 1 side platform
- Tracks: 1
- Train operators: Kintetsu Railway
- Connections

Other information
- Station code: G23
- Website: www.kintetsu.co.jp/station/station_info/station11010.html

History
- Opened: 21 October 1926

Passengers
- FY2019: 869 daily

Services
Preceding station	Kintetsu Railway	Following station
Higashiyama towards Ikoma	Ikoma Line Local	Heguri towards Ōji
Location

Motosanjōguchi Station (元山上口駅, Motosanjōguchi-eki)is a passenger railway station located in the town of Heguri, Ikoma District, Nara Prefecture, Japan. It is operated by the private transportation company, Kintetsu Railway.

== Line ==
Motosanjōguchi Station is served by the Ikoma Line and is 5.7 kilometers from the starting point of the line at Ōji.

== Layout ==
The station is a ground-level station with a side platform and one track. The station building and platform are on the outbound side (east side, i.e. the left side when facing Ōji). As it is a single-track station, both Ōji-bound and Ikoma-bound trains depart and arrive from the same platform. The effective length of the platform is for four cars. The station is unattended.

== History ==
Motosanjōguchi Station was opened 21 October 1926 on the Shigiikoma Electric Railway. It was raised to a permanent station on 19 December 1930. It became a Kintetsu Railway station due to a company merger on 1 October 1963.

== Passenger statistics ==
In fiscal 2019 the station was used by an average of 869 passengers daily (boarding passengers only).

== Surrounding area ==
- National Route 168
- Senkō-ji (千光寺)
- Ikoma Yamaguchi Jinja

== See also ==
- List of railway stations in Japan
