= Higashiyama Station (Nara) =

Railway station in Ikoma, Nara Prefecture, Japan

Higashiyama Station 東山駅
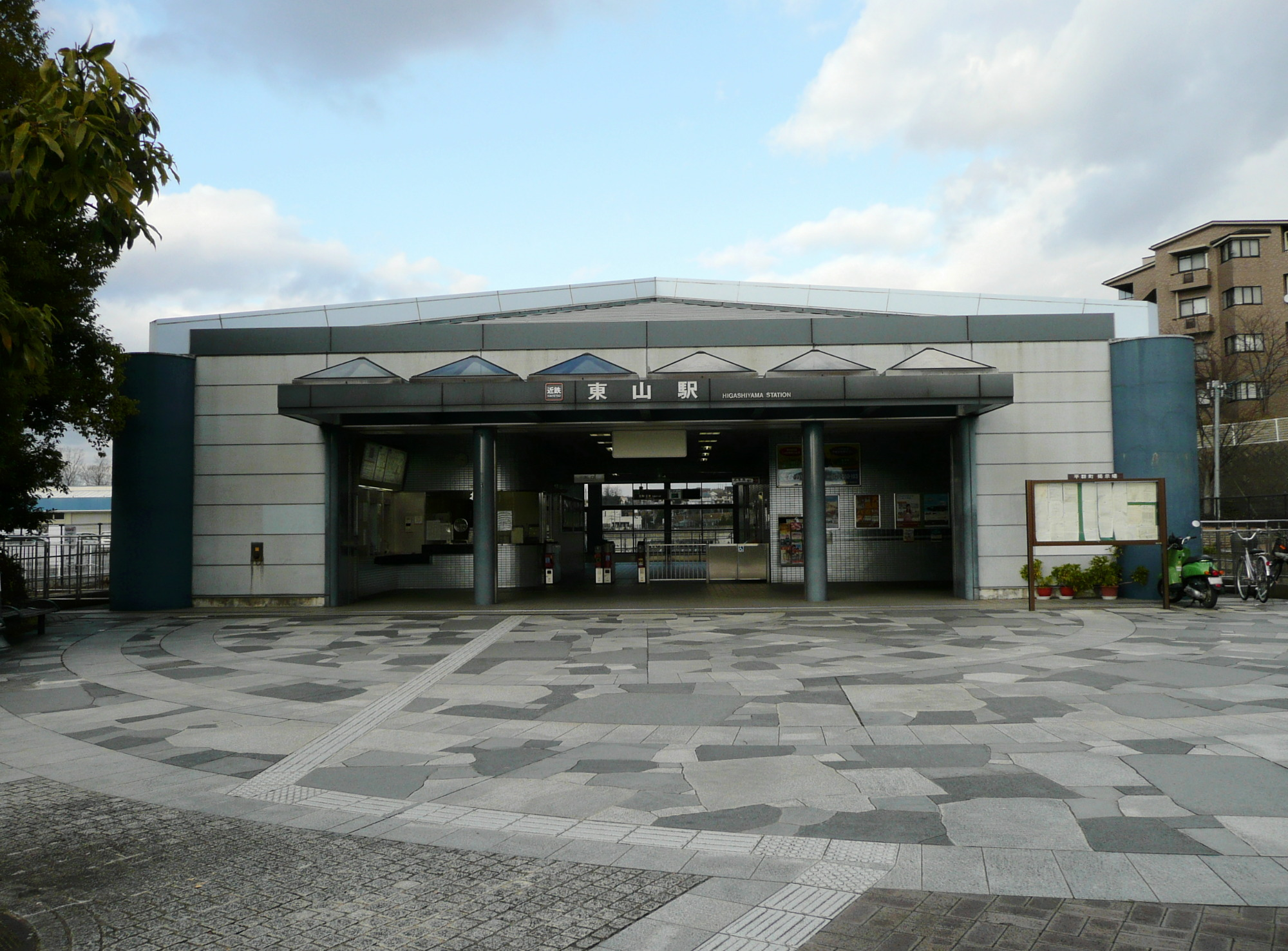
- Higashiyama Station

General information
- Location: 1144-12, Higashiyama-chō, Ikoma, Nara （奈良県生駒市東山町1144-12） Japan
- Coordinates: 34°38′54″N 135°42′30″E
- Owner: Kintetsu Railway
- Operator: Kintetsu Railway
- Line: F Ikoma Line
- Distance: 7.0 km (4.3 miles) from Ōji
- Platforms: 2 side platforms
- Train operators: Kintetsu Railway
- Connections: Bus stop

Construction
- Structure type: Elevated
- Parking: None
- Cycle facilities: Available

Other information
- Station code: G22
- Website: www.kintetsu.co.jp/station/station_info/en_station08011.html

History
- Opened: 21 September 1927
- Former names: Takeyama (until 1951)

Passengers
- 2019: 1708 daily
Services
Preceding station	Kintetsu Railway	Following station
Haginodai towards Ikoma	Ikoma Line Local	Motosanjōguchi towards Ōji
Location
- Location within Nara Prefecture Location within Japan

Higashiyama Station (東山駅, Higashiyama-eki) is a passenger railway station located in the city of Ikoma, Nara Prefecture, Japan. It is operated by the private transportation company, Kintetsu Railway.

== Line ==
Higashiyama Station is served by the Ikoma Line and is 7.0 kilometers from the starting point of the line at Ōji.

== Layout ==
Higashiyama Station has two side platforms and two tracks, connected by an elevated station building. The ticket gates and the station entrance are at ground level. Although there are two side platforms, the tracks at platform 1 end on the Ōji side (south end), so in principle all trains use platform 2, and platform 1 is a dedicated platform for local trains between Ikoma Station and this station (it is closed when there are no return trains). The station is unattended.

=== Platforms ===
1	■ G Ikoma Line	for Ikoma
2	■ G Ikoma Line	for Ikoma, Ōsaka Namba, Nara, AmagasakiSannomiya

== History ==
The station opened on 21 September 1927 as Takeyama Station (茸山駅), a seasonal station on the Shigiikoma Electric Railway to facilitate passengers coming to view maples and pick mushrooms in the fall. It was promoted to a full statiojn on 10 September 1951 and was renamed to its present name at that time. The Shigiikoma Electric Railway was acquired by Kintetsu in 1964, becoming the Kintetsu Ikoma Line. The station was relocated and rebuilt in 1993.

== Passenger statistics ==
In fiscal 2019, the station was used by an average of 1708 passengers daily (boarding passengers only).

== Surrounding area ==
- Kindai University Nara Hospital
- Japan National Route 168

== See also ==
- List of railway stations in Japan
