= Ichibu Station (Nara) =

Railway station in Ikoma, Nara Prefecture, Japan

Ichibu Station 一分駅
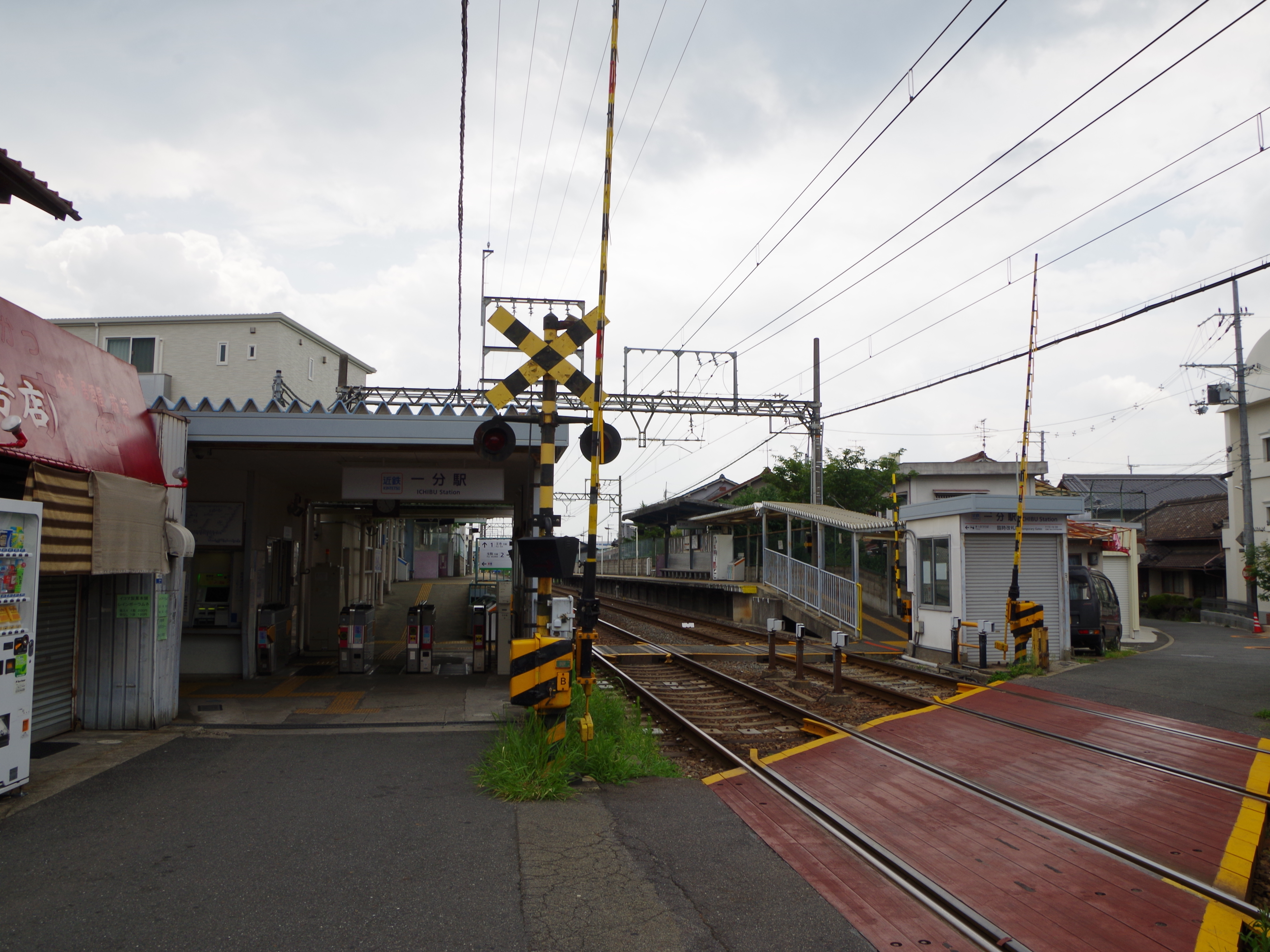
- Ichibu Station in August 2013

General information
- Location: 902-3, Ichibu-chō, Ikoma, Nara （奈良県生駒市壱分町902-3） Japan
- Coordinates: 34°40′31″N 135°42′29″E
- Owner: Kintetsu Railway
- Operator: Kintetsu Railway
- Line: F Ikoma Line
- Distance: 10.1 km (6.3 miles) from Ōji
- Platforms: 2 side platforms
- Tracks: 2
- Train operators: Kintetsu Railway

Construction
- Structure type: At-grade
- Accessible: Yes (ramps to platform level)

Other information
- Station code: G19
- Website: www.kintetsu.co.jp/station/station_info/en_station08014.html

History
- Opened: 28 December 1926

Passengers
- 2019: 2742 daily

Services
Preceding station	Kintetsu Railway	Following station
Nabata G18 towards Ikoma	Ikoma Line Local	Minami-Ikoma G20 towards Ōji
Location
- Location within Nara Prefecture Location within Japan

Ichibu Station (一分駅, Ichibu-eki) is a passenger railway station located in the city of Ikoma, Nara Prefecture, Japan. It is operated by the private transportation company, Kintetsu Railway. The name of 'Ichibu' can be found in a record written in the 8th century, as a place of the residence of Prince Arima in the 7th century.

== Line ==
Ichibu Station is served by the Ikoma Line and is 10.1 kilometers from the starting point of the line at Ōji.

== Layout ==
Ichibu Station is a ground-level station with two opposing side platforms and two tracks. There are temporary ticket gates for rush hour only on the platform 1 side of the main station building and on the platform 2 side of the station building. The two platforms are connected by a level crossing. The temporary ticket gate on the west side of the tracks can be used between 7:15 and 9:00 on weekdays. The station is unattended.

=== Platforms ===
1	■ G Ikoma Line	for Ōji
2	■ G Ikoma Line	for Ikoma

== History ==
The station opened on 28 December 1926 on the Shigiikoma Electric Railway. The Shigiikoma Electric Railway was acquired by Kintetsu in 1964, becoming the Kintetsu Ikoma Line

== Passenger statistics ==
In fiscal 2019, the station was used by an average of 2742 passengers daily (boarding passengers only).

== Surrounding area ==
- Oumazaikomatsuhiko Shrine (Ikoma Taisha Shrine)
- Ikoma City Ichibu Elementary School
- Nara Prefectural Ikoma High School
- Satsukidai Residential Area
- Japan National Route 168

== See also ==
- List of railway stations in Japan
