= Udozuka Kofun =

Kofun period keyhole-shaped burial mound in Japan

- 烏土塚古墳 (Japanese)
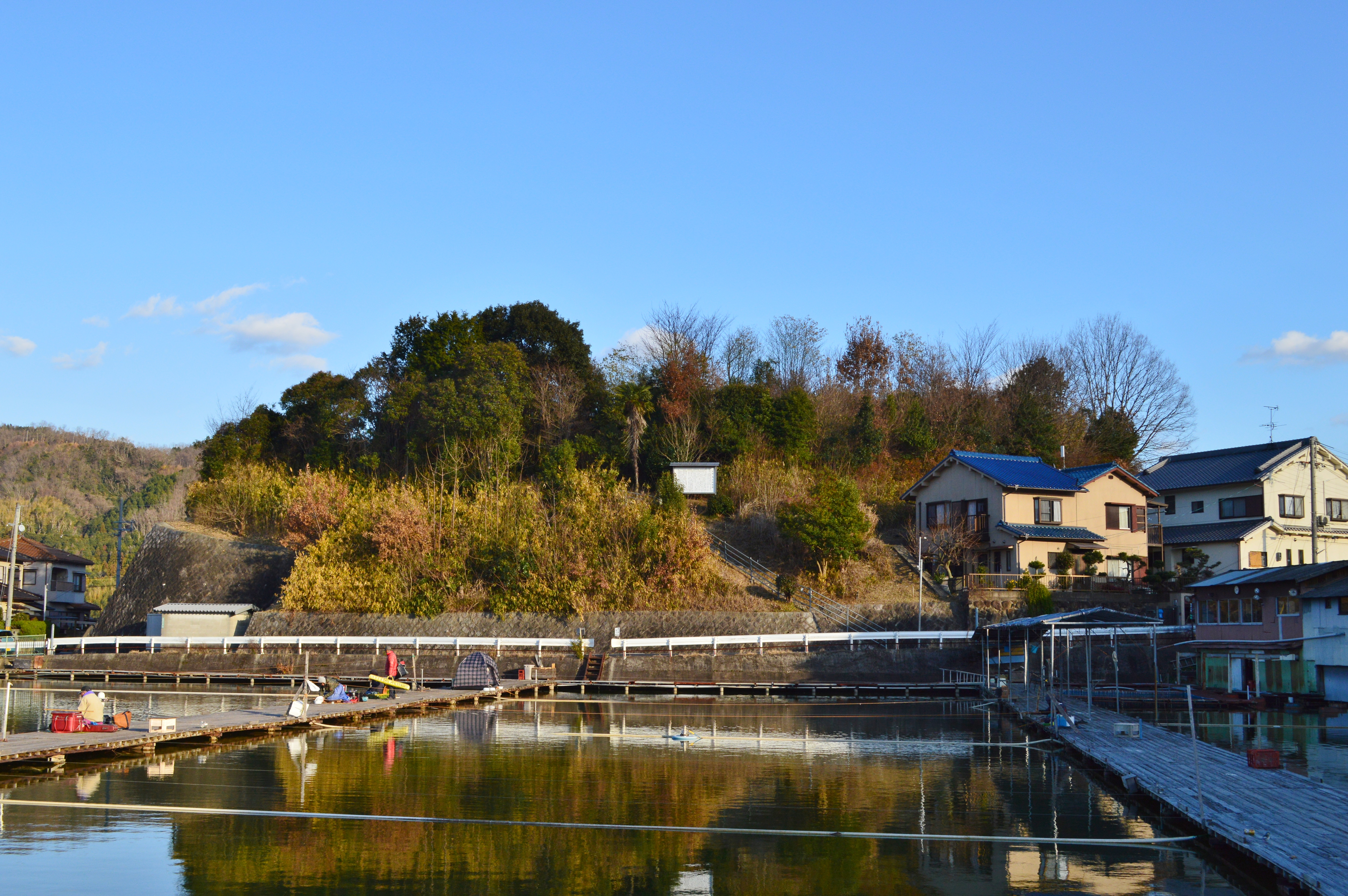
- Udozuka Kofun

- Udozuka Kofun Udozuka Kofun (Japan)
- Interactive map of Udozuka Kofun
- 34°37′4.07″N 135°42′8.67″E
- Type: Kofun
- Periods: Kofun period
- Location: Heguri, Nara, Japan
- Region: Kansai region

History
- Built: c.6th century

Site notes
- Public access: Yes (no facilities)

Udozuka Kofun (烏土塚古墳) is a Kofun period burial mound, located in the Kasugaoka neighborhood of the town of Heguri, Nara in the Kansai region of Japan. The tumulus was designated a National Historic Site of Japan in 1971.

== Overview ==
The Udozuka Kofun is located at the tip of a branching ridge at the eastern foot of the Ikoma Mountains, which run north and south along the border between Osaka Prefecture and Nara Prefecture. Archaeological excavations were carried out in 1969 . It is a zenpō-kōen-fun (前方後円墳), which is shaped like a keyhole, having one square end and one circular end, when viewed from above, with a total length of 60.5 meters, making it the largest tumulus in the Heguri region. The posterior circular portion has a diameter of about 35 meters and height of about 9 meters, and the width of the anterior rectangular portion is 31 meters. The mound was constructed in one tier, although no trace of fukiishi roofing stones have been found, the mound had a row of cylindrical haniwa. A moat (approximately 2 meters wide) has been found around the mound.

The horizontal-entry stone burial chamber opens to the south of the rear circular mound was built with huge stones. The burial chamber is about 6 meters long, 2.1 meters wide, and 4.4 meters high. The entrance passage is about 8.2 meters long and 2.1 meters wide, with a culvert-type drainage ditch in the center. A house-shaped stone sarcophagus made of tuff is located in the burial chamber, and the bottom of another tuff sarcophagus is located in the entrance passage. Excavated grave goods include a four-animal bronze mirror, a large iron sword, gilt bronze horse equipment, jewels, and Sue ware pottry. It is believed to have been built around the mid-6th century in the late Kofun period, and is considered a rare example of a megalithic tomb with clearly excavated artifacts.

The tumulus is about a five-minute walk from Tatsutagawa Station on the Kintetsu Railway Ikoma Line.

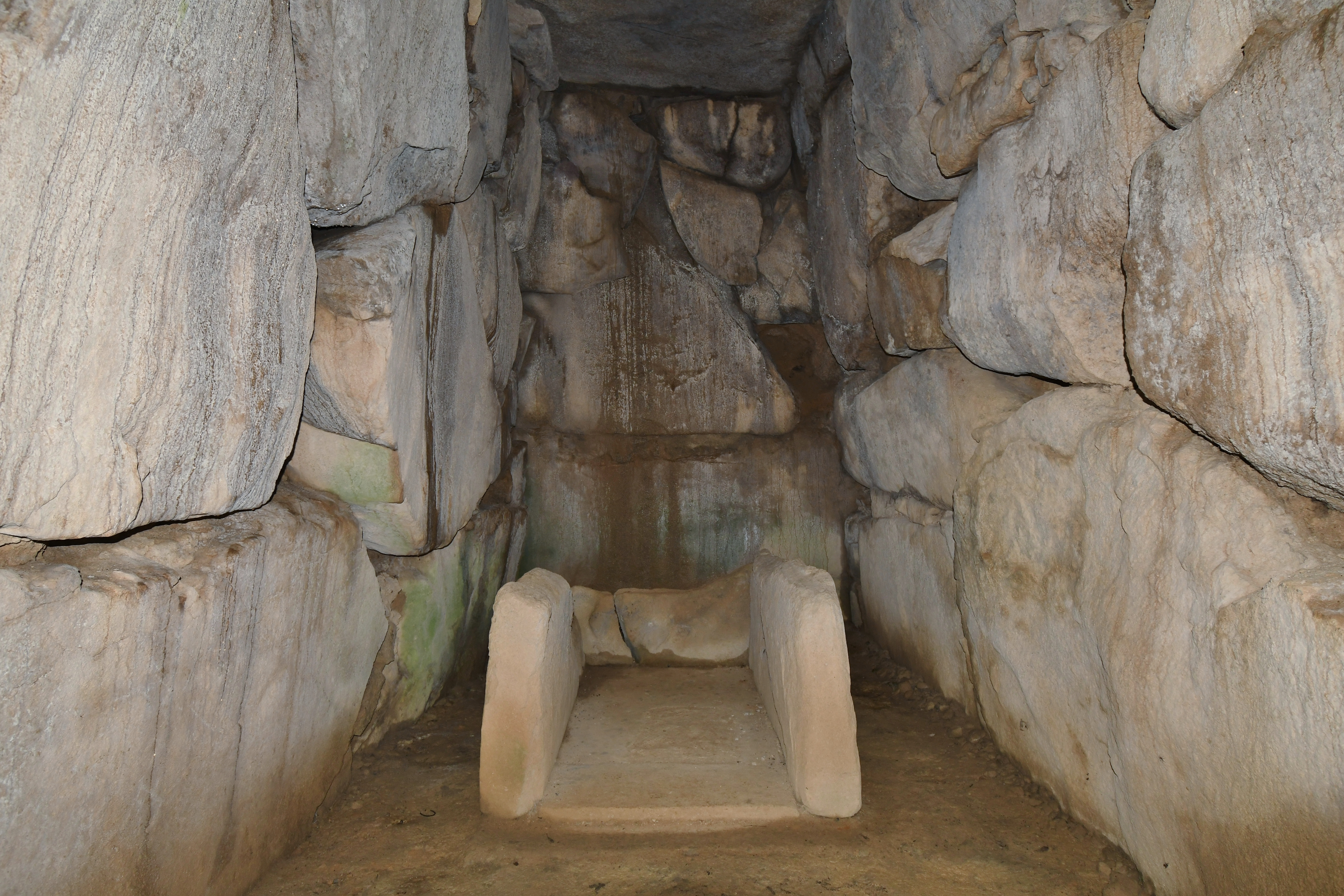
Burial Chamber

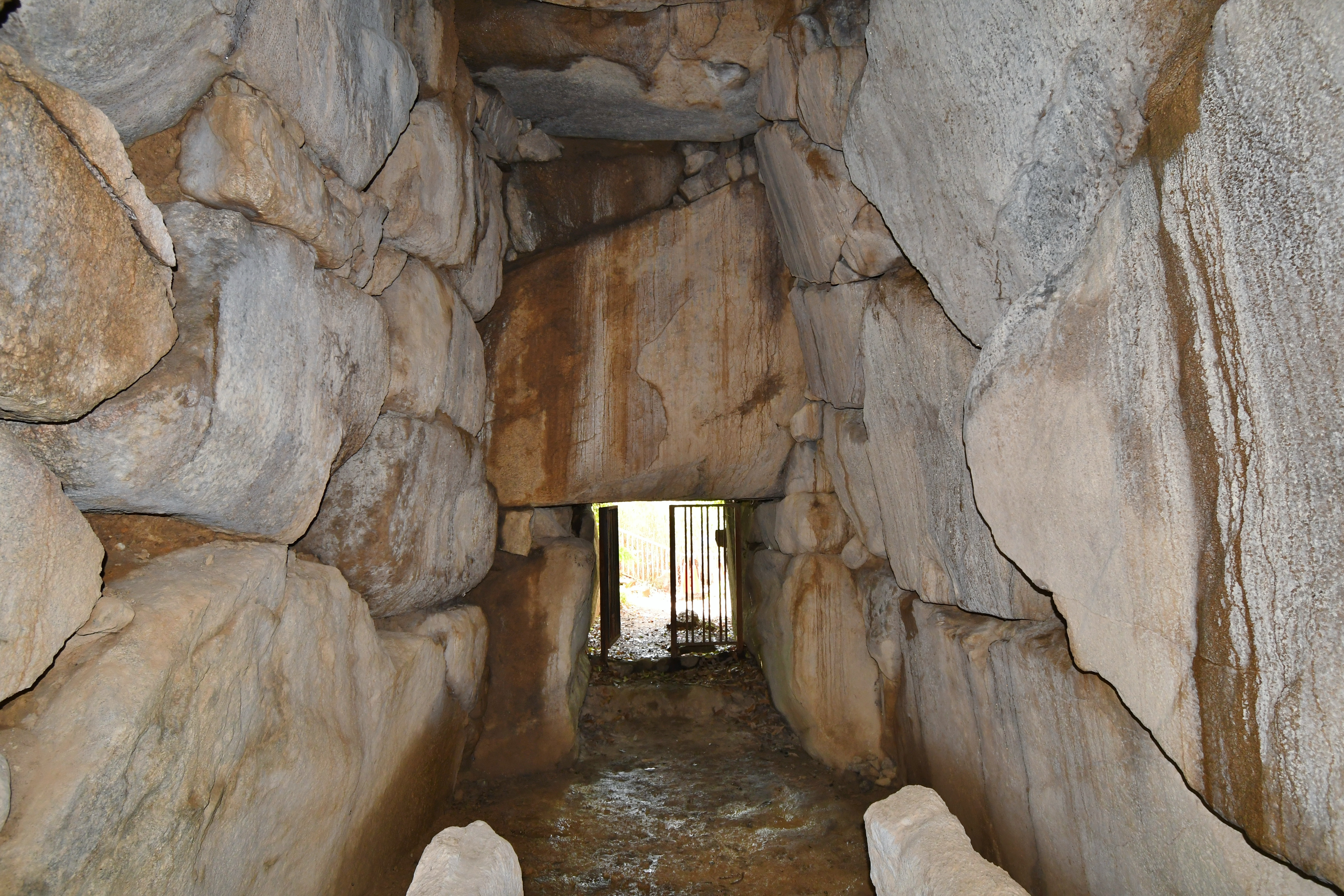
Burial chamber looking towards entrance

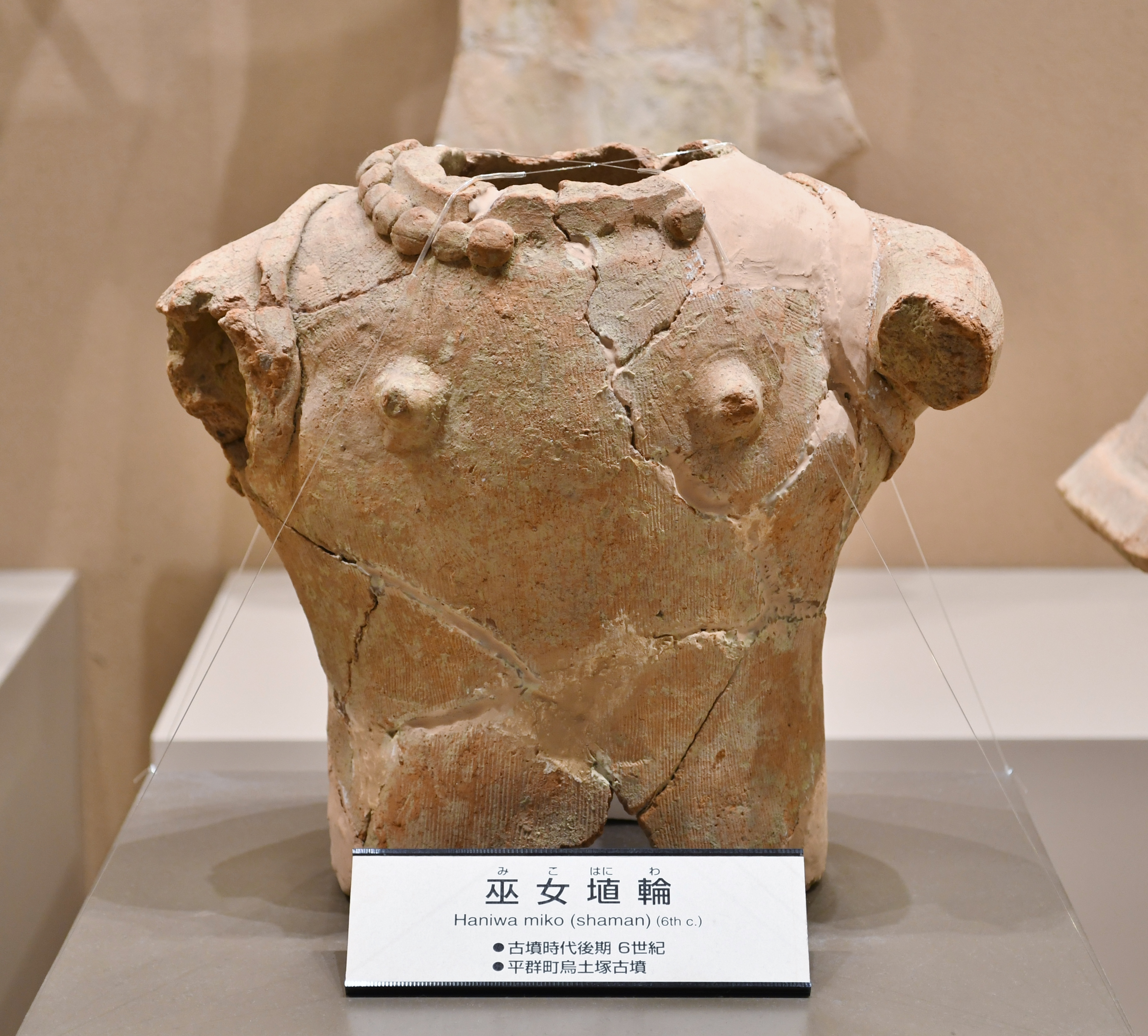
haniwa in form of a woman

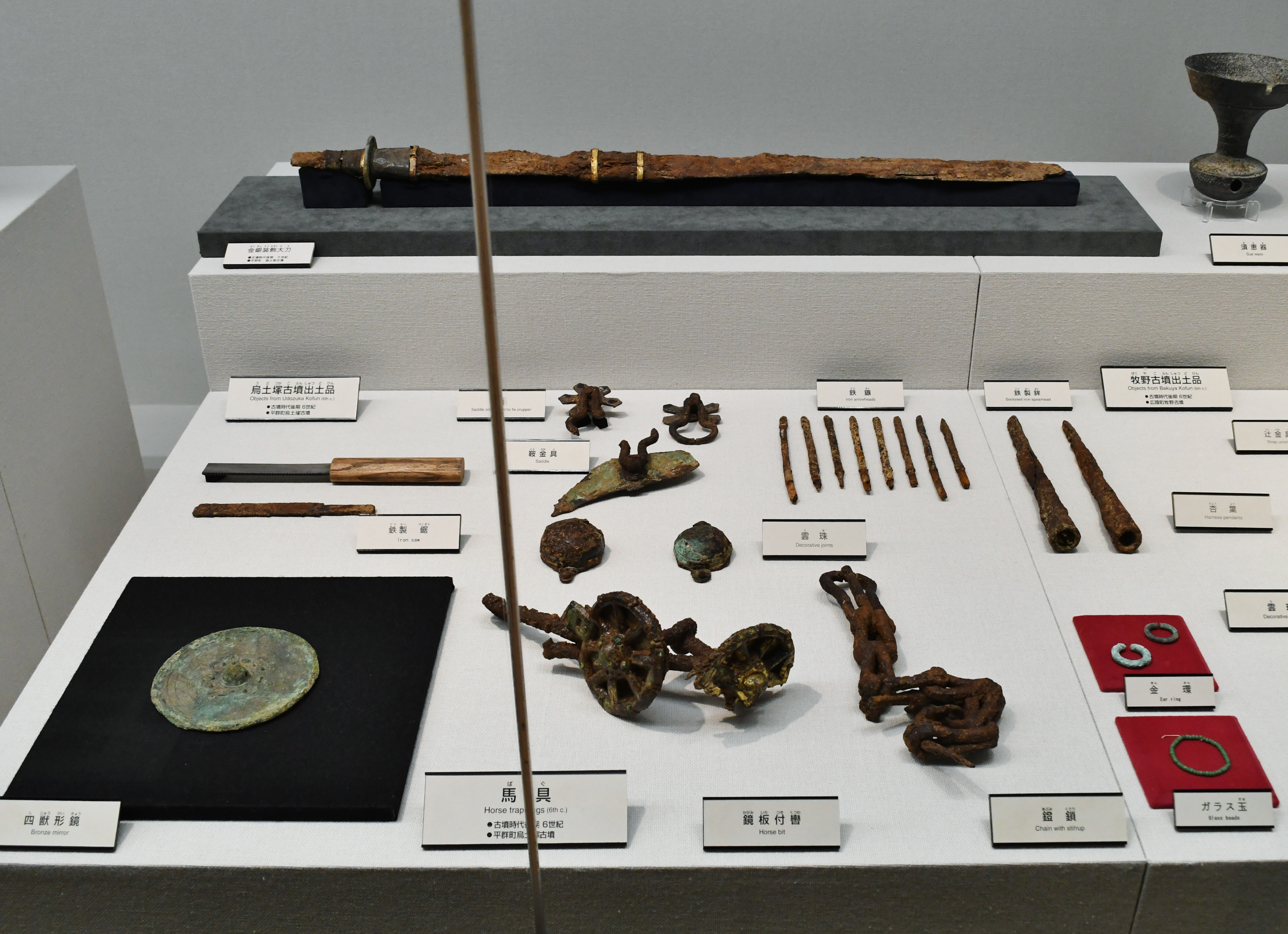
grave goods

== See also ==
- List of Historic Sites of Japan (Nara)
