= Seya-Kitaguchi Station =

Railway station in Sangō, Nara Prefecture, Japan

Seya-Kitaguchi Station 勢野北口駅
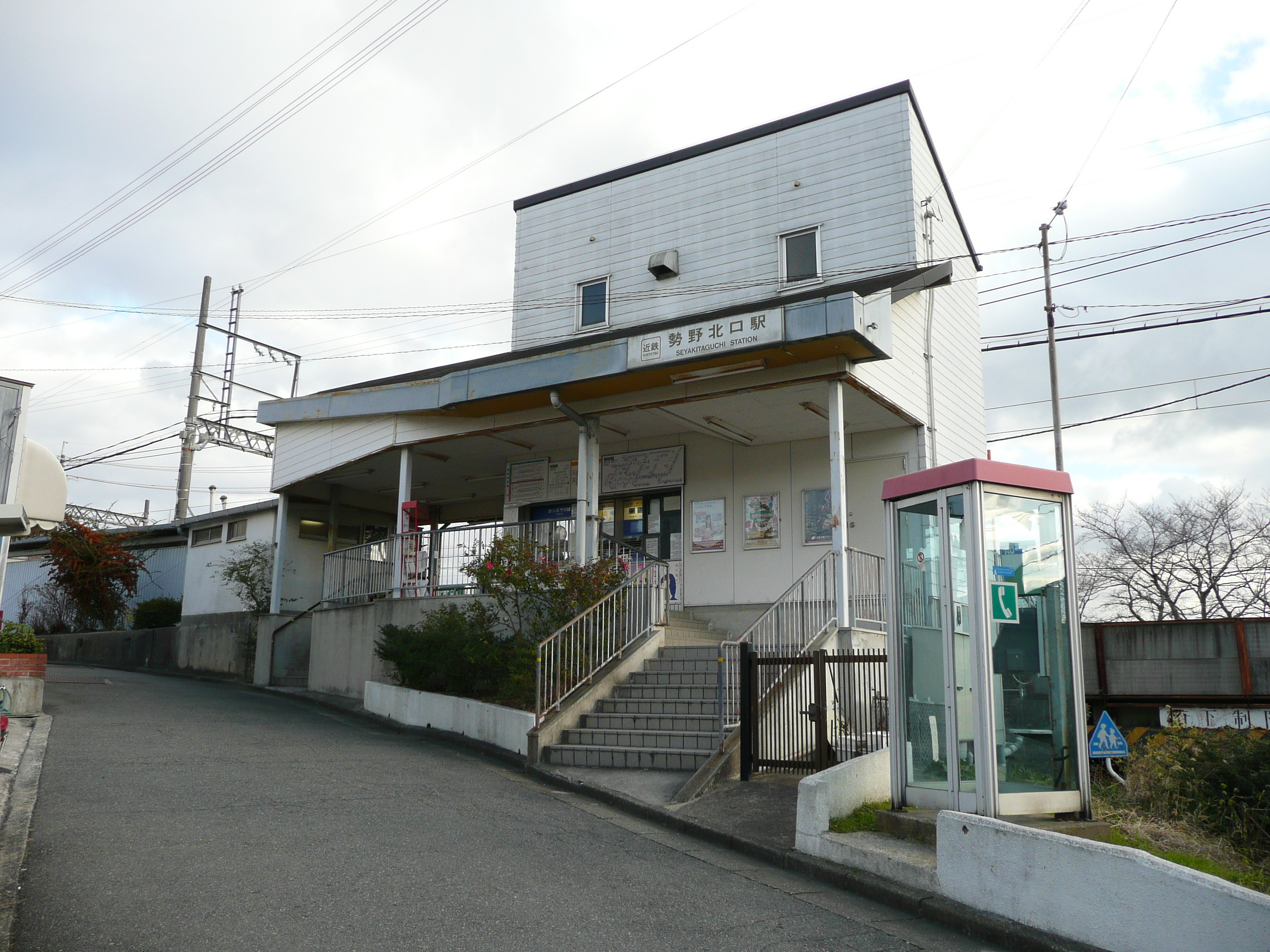
- Seya-Kitaguchi Station

General information
- Location: 4-3-50 Seyahigashi, Sangō, Ikoma District, Nara （奈良県生駒郡三郷町勢野東四丁目3-50） Japan
- Coordinates: 34°36′21.77″N 135°42′3″E
- System: Kintetsu Railway commuter rail station
- Owner: Kintetsu Railway
- Operator: Kintetsu Railway
- Line: G Ikoma Line
- Distance: 1.7 km (1.1 miles) from Ōji
- Platforms: 1 side platform
- Tracks: 1
- Train operators: Kintetsu Railway
- Connections: None

Construction
- Structure type: At grade
- Parking: None
- Cycle facilities: Available

Other information
- Station code: G26
- Website: Official website

History
- Opened: 20 November 1951

Passengers
- 2019: 1023 daily

Services
Preceding station	Kintetsu Railway	Following station
Tatsutagawa towards Ikoma	Ikoma Line	Shigisanshita towards Ōji
Location
- Location within Nara Prefecture Location within Japan

Seya-Kitaguchi Station (勢野北口駅, Seya-Kitaguchi-eki) is a passenger railway station located in the town of Sangō, Nara Prefecture, Japan. It is operated by the private transportation company, Kintetsu Railway.

== Line ==
Seya-Kitaguchi Station is served by the Ikoma Line and is 1.7 kilometers from the starting point of the line at Ōji

== Layout ==
The station is a ground-level station on a slope with a single side platform and one track. The station building and platform are on the right side when facing Ōji. The effective length of the platform is for four cars. The station is unattended.

== History ==
Seya-Kitaguchi Station opened on 20 November 1951 on the Shigi-Ikoma Electric Railroad. The Shigi-Ikoma Electric Railroad was merged with the Kintetsu Railway on 1 October 1964.

== Passenger statistics ==
In fiscal 2019, the station was used by an average of 1023 passengers daily (boarding passengers only).

== Surrounding area ==
The station is located in a residential area.

== See also ==
- List of railway stations in Japan
