= Nabata Station =

Railway station in Ikoma, Nara Prefecture, Japan

Nabata Station 菜畑駅
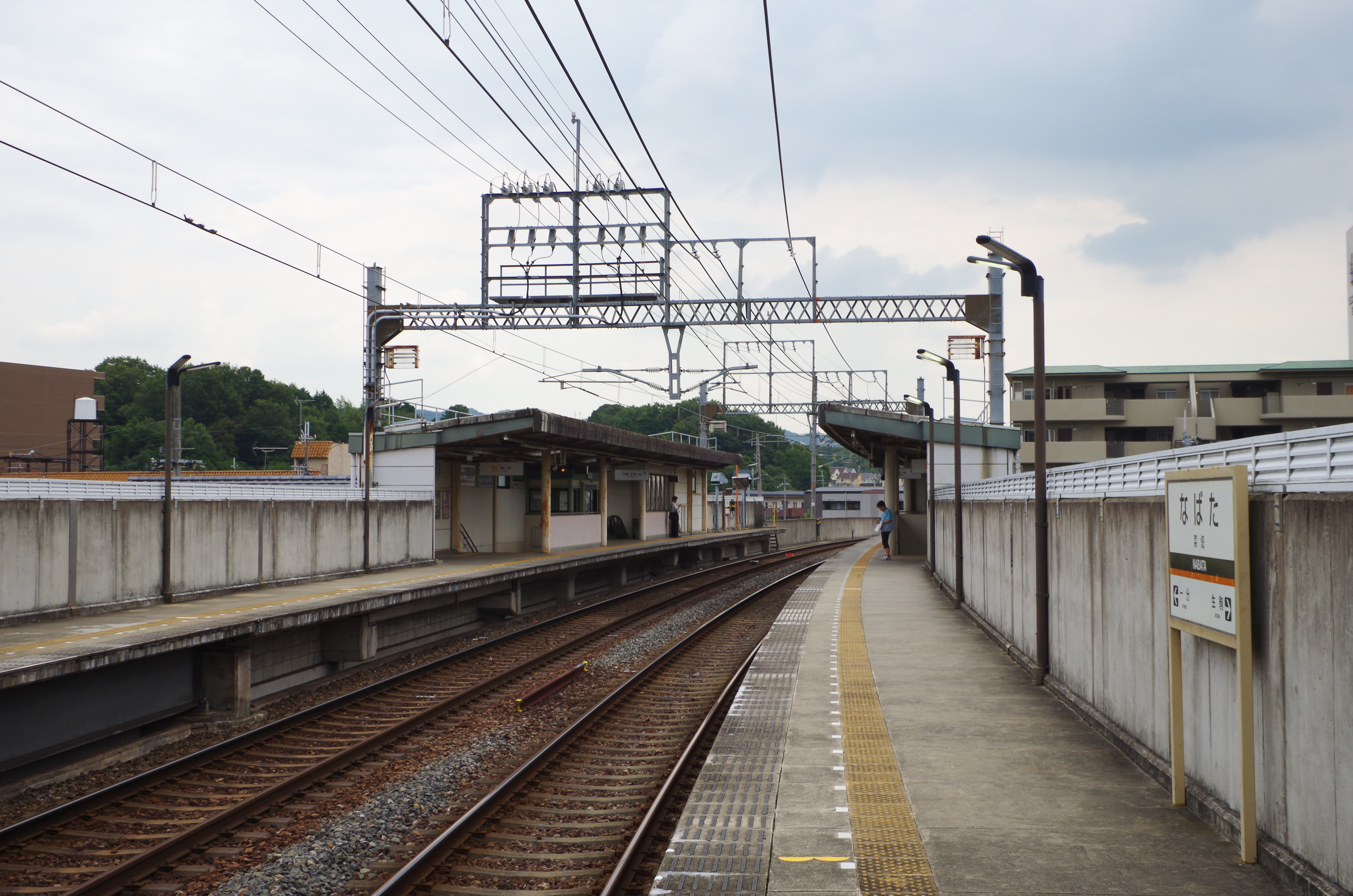
- Nabata Station platforms in August 2013

General information
- Location: 1-54-2, Nakanabata, Ikoma, Nara （奈良県生駒市中菜畑一丁目54-2） Japan
- Coordinates: 34°41′09″N 135°42′24″E
- Owner: Kintetsu Railway
- Operator: Kintetsu Railway
- Line: F Ikoma Line
- Distance: 10.1 km (6.3 miles) from Ōji
- Platforms: 2 side platforms
- Tracks: 2
- Train operators: Kintetsu Railway

Construction
- Structure type: Elevated
- Accessible: No

Other information
- Station code: G18
- Website: www.kintetsu.co.jp/station/station_info/en_station08014.html

History
- Opened: 1 September 1927
- Former names: Shin-Ikoma (1935-1937)

Passengers
- 2019: 2126 daily

Services
Preceding station	Kintetsu Railway	Following station
Ikoma Terminus	Ikoma Line Local	Ichibu towards Ōji
Location

Nabata Station (菜畑駅, Nabata-eki) is a passenger railway station located in the city of Ikoma, Nara Prefecture, Japan. It is operated by the private transportation company, Kintetsu Railway.

== Line ==
Nabata Station is served by the Ikoma Line and is 11.2 kilometers from the starting point of the line at Ōji.

== Layout ==
The station is an elevated station with two side platforms and two tracks. The effective length of the platform is four cars. The ticket gates and concourse are on the first floor, and the platform is on the second floor. There is only one ticket gate. The station is unattended.

=== Platforms ===
1	■ G Ikoma Line	for Ōji
2	■ G Ikoma Line	for Ikoma

== History ==
The station opened on 1 September 1927 on the Shigiikoma Electric Railway. From 1935-1937 the station was named Shin-Ikoma Station (新生駒駅). The Shigiikoma Electric Railway was acquired by Kintetsu in 1964, becoming the Kintetsu Ikoma Line.

== Passenger statistics ==
In fiscal 2019, the station was used by an average of 2126 passengers daily (boarding passengers only).

== Surrounding area ==
- National Route 168
- Higashi-Ikoma Station
- Tezukayama University Higashiikoma Campus

== See also ==
- List of railway stations in Japan
