= Tatsutagawa Station =

Railway station in Heguri, Nara Prefecture, Japan

Tatsutagawa Station 竜田川駅
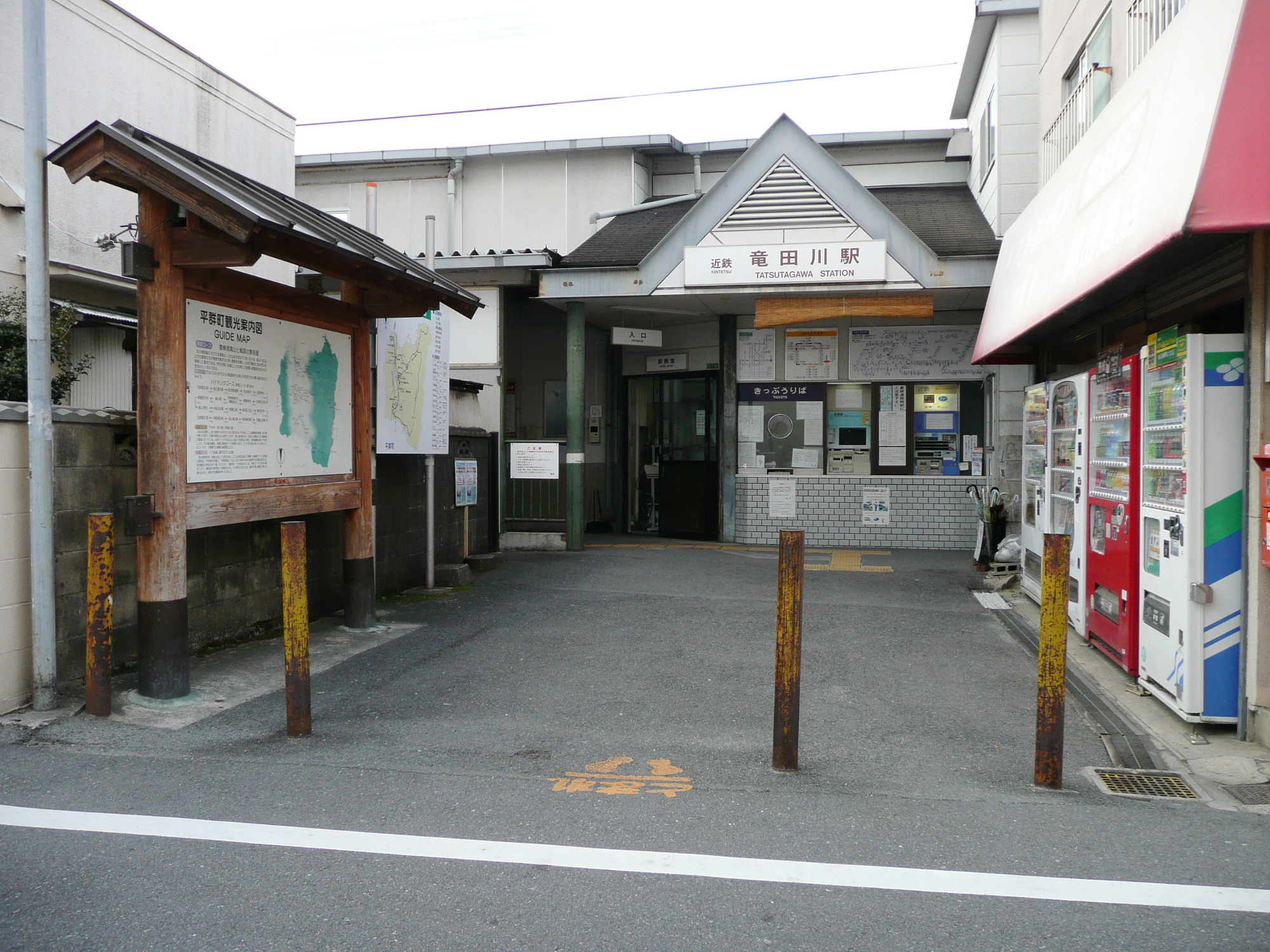
- Station building

General information
- Location: 2-7-12, Nishinomiya, Heguri, Ikoma District, Nara （奈良県生駒郡平群町西宮二丁目7-12） Japan
- Coordinates: 34°37′01″N 135°42′16″E
- System: Kintetsu Railway commuter rail station
- Owner: Kintetsu Railway
- Operator: Kintetsu Railway
- Line: G Ikoma Line
- Distance: 3.1 km (1.9 miles) from Ōji
- Platforms: 1 side platform
- Tracks: 1
- Train operators: Kintetsu Railway
- Connections

Other information
- Station code: G25
- Website: www.kintetsu.co.jp/station/station_info/station11008.html

History
- Opened: 1 November 1926

Passengers
- FY2019: 986 daily

Services
Preceding station	Kintetsu Railway	Following station
Heguri towards Ikoma	Ikoma Line Local	Seya-Kitaguchi towards Ōji
Location

Tatsutagawa Station (竜田川駅, Tatsutagawa-eki) is a passenger railway station located in the town of Heguri, Ikoma District, Nara Prefecture, Japan. It is operated by the private transportation company, Kintetsu Railway.

== Line ==
Tatsutagawa Station is served by the Ikoma Line and is 3.1 kilometers from the starting point of the line at Ōji.

== Layout ==
The stationis a ground-level station with a side platform and one track. The station building and platform are on the outbound side (east side, i.e. the left side when facing Ōji). As it is a single-track station, both Ōji-bound and Ikoma-bound trains depart and arrive from the same platform. The effective length of the platform is for four cars. The station is unattended.

== History ==
Tatsutagawa Station was opened 1 November 1926 as a seasonal station on the Shigiikoma Electric Railway to accommodate passengers coming to view maples and pick mushrooms in the fall. It was raised o a permanent station on 19 December 1930. It became a Kintetsu Railway station due to a company merger on 1 October 1963.

== Passenger statistics ==
In fiscal 2019 the station was used by an average of 986 passengers daily (boarding passengers only).

== Surrounding area ==
- Tatsuta River
- Karasuzuka Kofun
- Tsubakii Castle Ruins
- Heguri Town Heguri Minami Elementary School

== See also ==
- List of railway stations in Japan
