= Haginodai Station =

Railway station in Ikoma, Nara Prefecture, Japan

Haginodai Station 萩の台駅
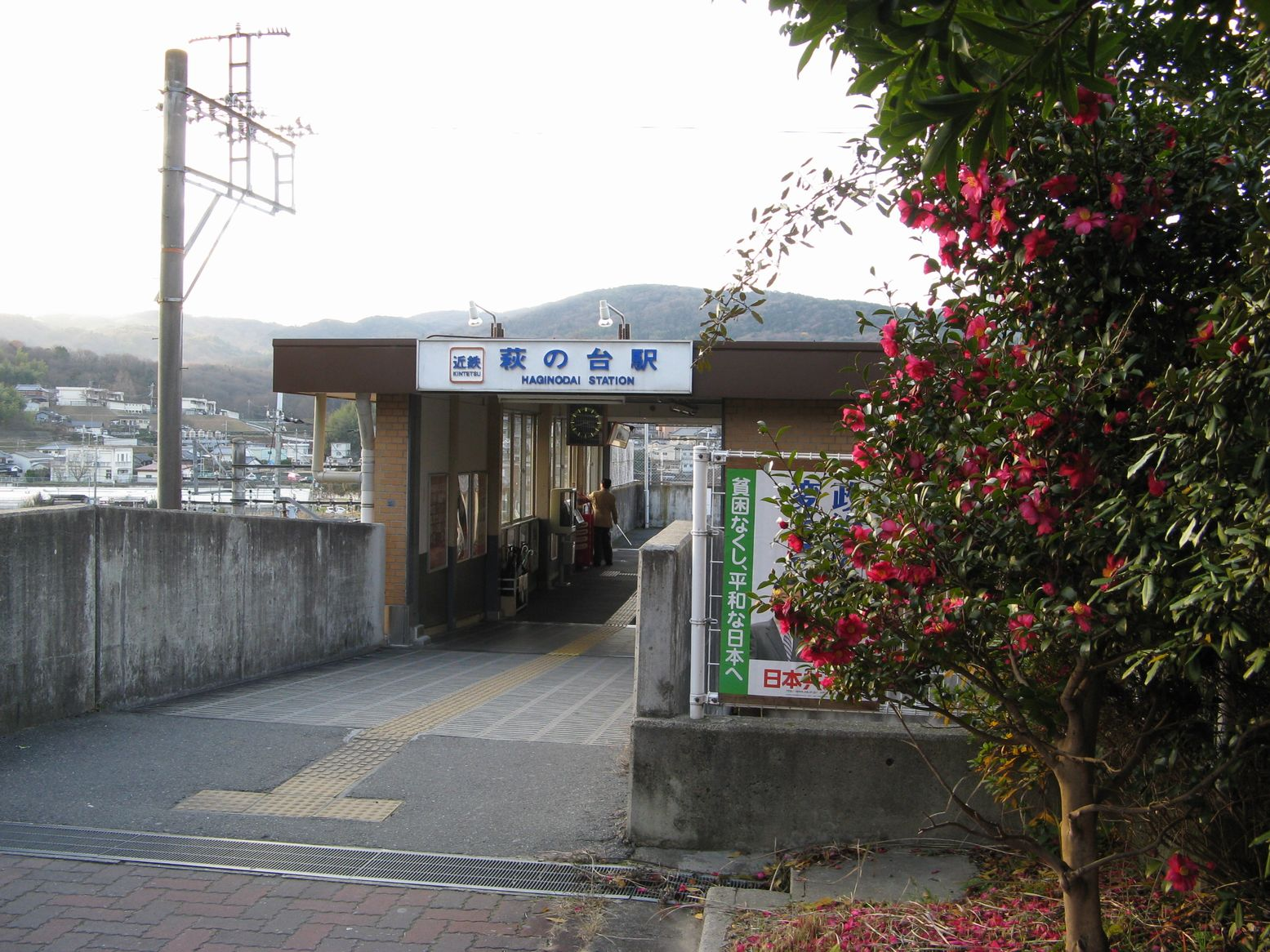
- Haginodai Station

General information
- Location: 1-3-1, Haginodai, Ikoma, Nara （奈良県生駒市萩の台一丁目3-1） Japan
- Coordinates: 34°39′24″N 135°42′32″E
- System: Kintetsu Railway commuter rail station
- Owner: Kintetsu Railway
- Operator: Kintetsu Railway
- Line: F Ikoma Line
- Distance: 7.80 km (4.85 miles) from Ōji
- Platforms: 1 island platform
- Train operators: Kintetsu Railway
- Connections

Other information
- Station code: G21
- Website: www.kintetsu.co.jp/station/station_info/en_station08012.html

History
- Opened: 23 April 1980

Passengers
- 2019: 1375
Services
Preceding station	Kintetsu Railway	Following station
Minami-Ikoma towards Ikoma	Ikoma Line Local	Higashiyama towards Ōji
Location
- Location within Nara Prefecture Location within Japan

Haginodai Station (萩の台駅, Haginodai-eki) i is a passenger railway station located in the city of Ikoma, Nara Prefecture, Japan. It is operated by the private transportation company, Kintetsu Railway.

== Line ==
Haginodai Station is served by the Ikoma Line and is 7.9 kilometers from the starting point of the line at Ōji.

== Layout ==
Higashiyama Station is an elevated station with one island platform and two tracks. It is a double-tracked on the Ōji side and single-tracked on the Ikoma side, allowing trains to pass each other. The effective length of the platform is enough for four cars. There are station entrances on both the east and west sides, and due to the terrain, the east entrance is at the same height as the neighboring residential area. There is only one ticket gate. The station is unattended.

=== Platforms ===
1	■ G Ikoma Line	for Ōji
2	■ G Ikoma Line	for Ikoma

== History ==
The station opened on 23 April 1980.

== Passenger statistics ==
In fiscal 2019, the station was used by an average of 1375 passengers daily (boarding passengers only).

== Surrounding area ==
- Haginodai residential area
- Ikoma Minami Dai-ni Elementary School

== See also ==
- List of railway stations in Japan
