= Chōgosonshi-ji =

Buddhist temple in Nara Prefecture, Japan

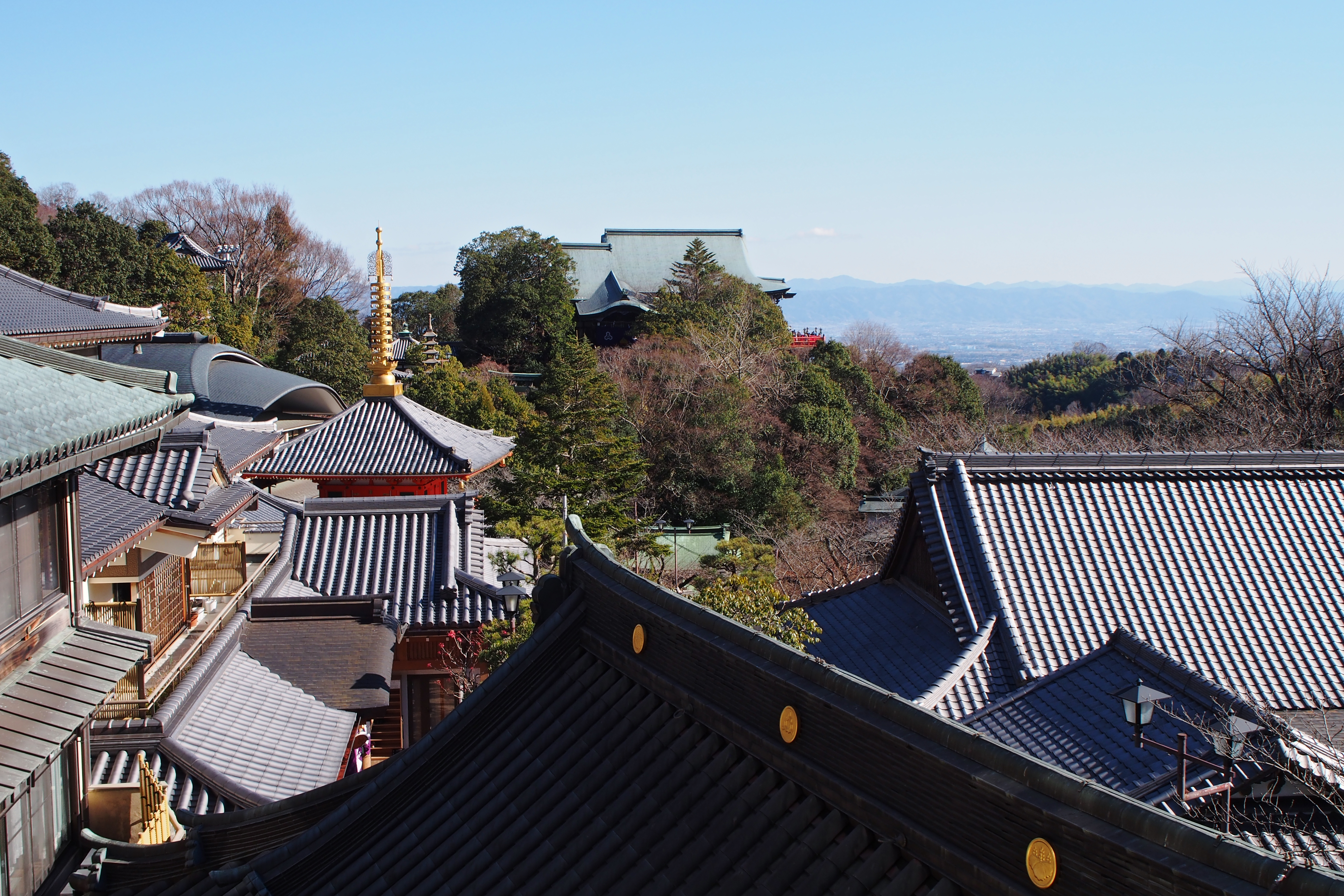
- Temple buildings

- Location within Japan

Religion
- Affiliation: Shigi-san Shingon Buddhism
- Deity: Vaiśravaṇa

Location
- Location: 2280-1, Oaza Shigisan; Heguri, Ikoma-gun; Nara Prefecture 636-0923
- Country: Japan
- Coordinates: 34°36′34″N 135°40′16.6″E

Architecture
- Completed: Unknown

Website
- Chōgosonshi-ji

Chōgosonshi-ji (朝護孫子寺), popularly called Shigisan (信貴山), is a Buddhist temple in Ikoma, Nara Prefecture, Japan. It was established in 587.

== Gallery ==
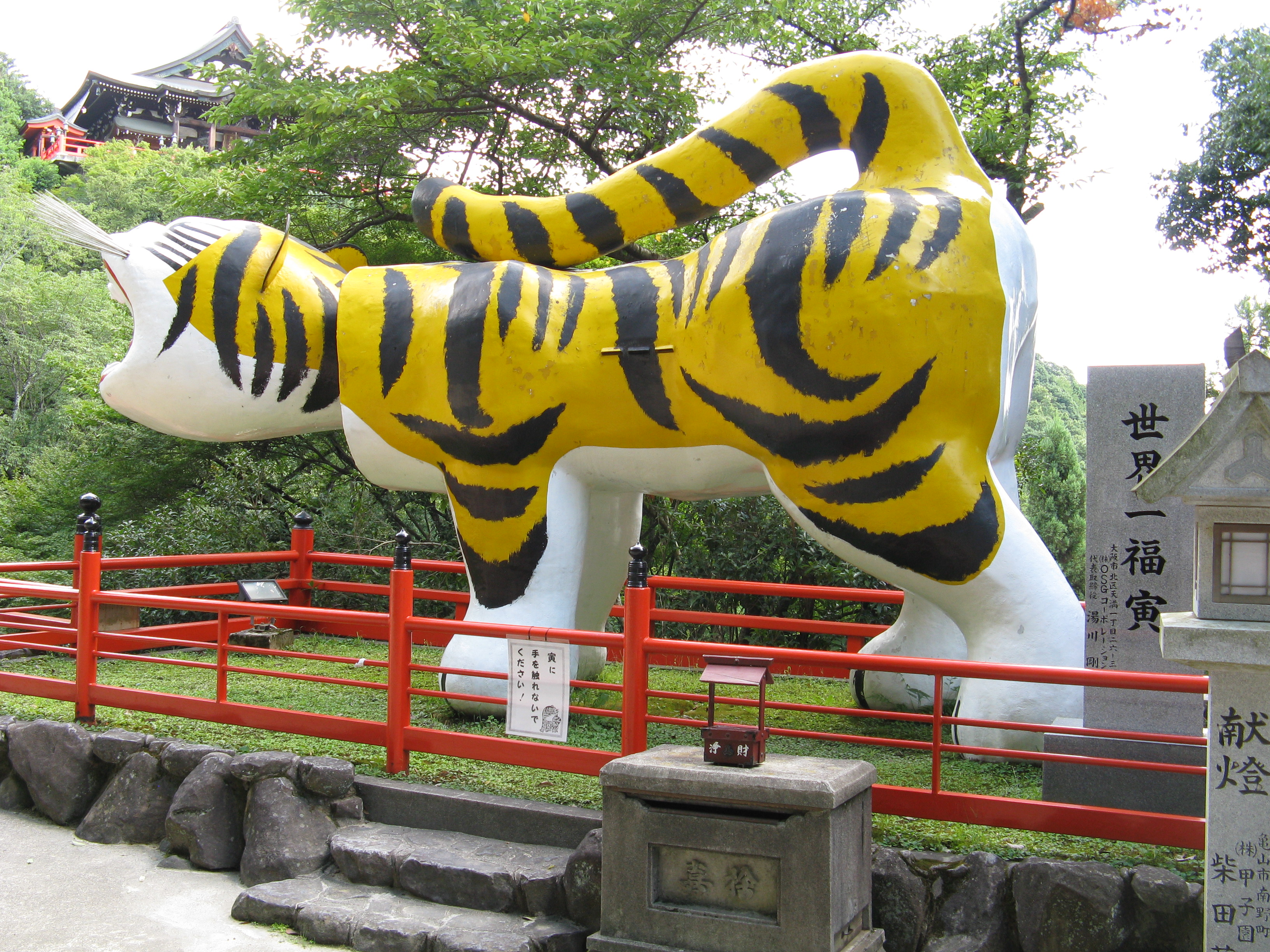
Sekaiichi Fukutora

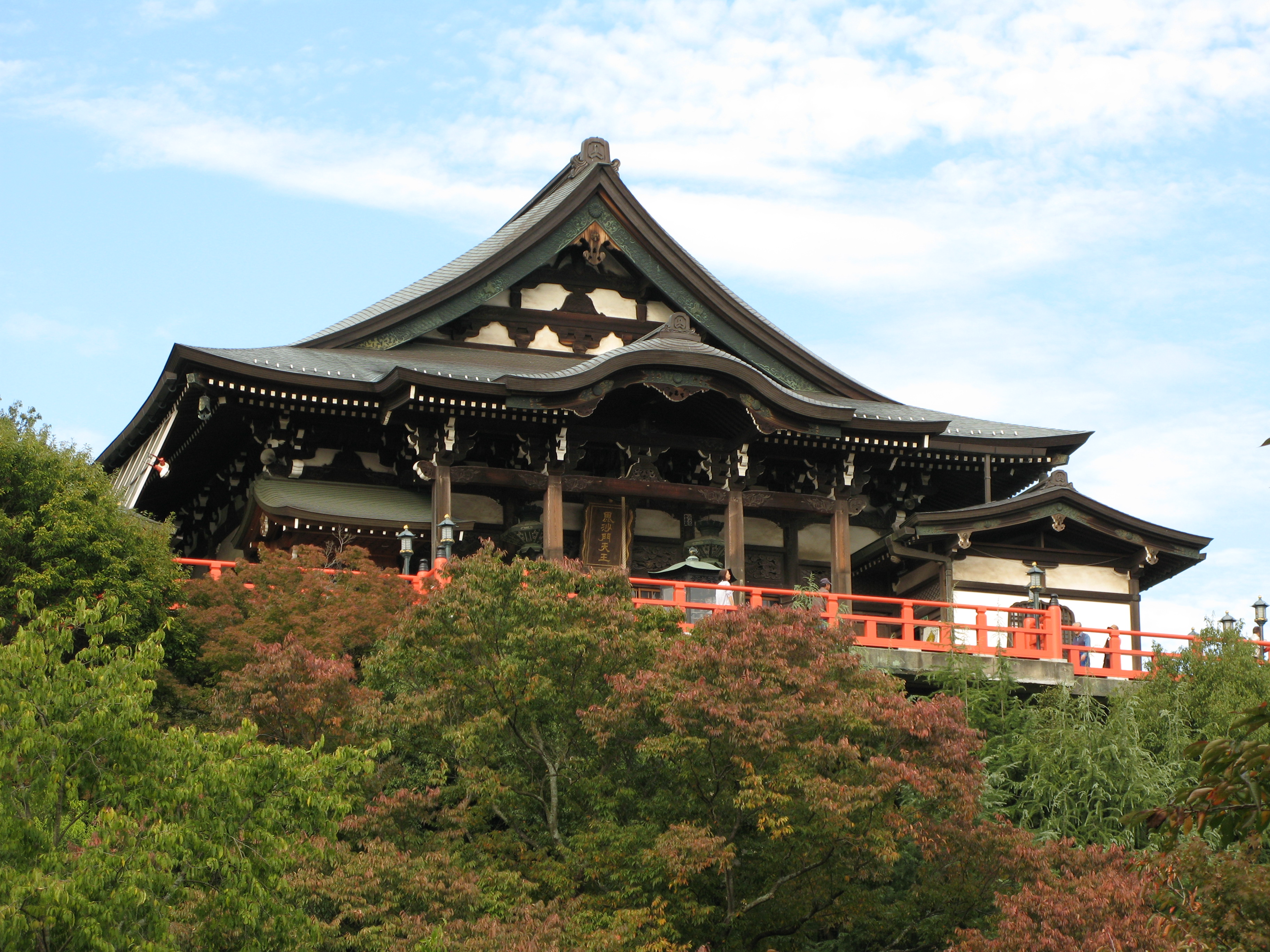
Main Hall

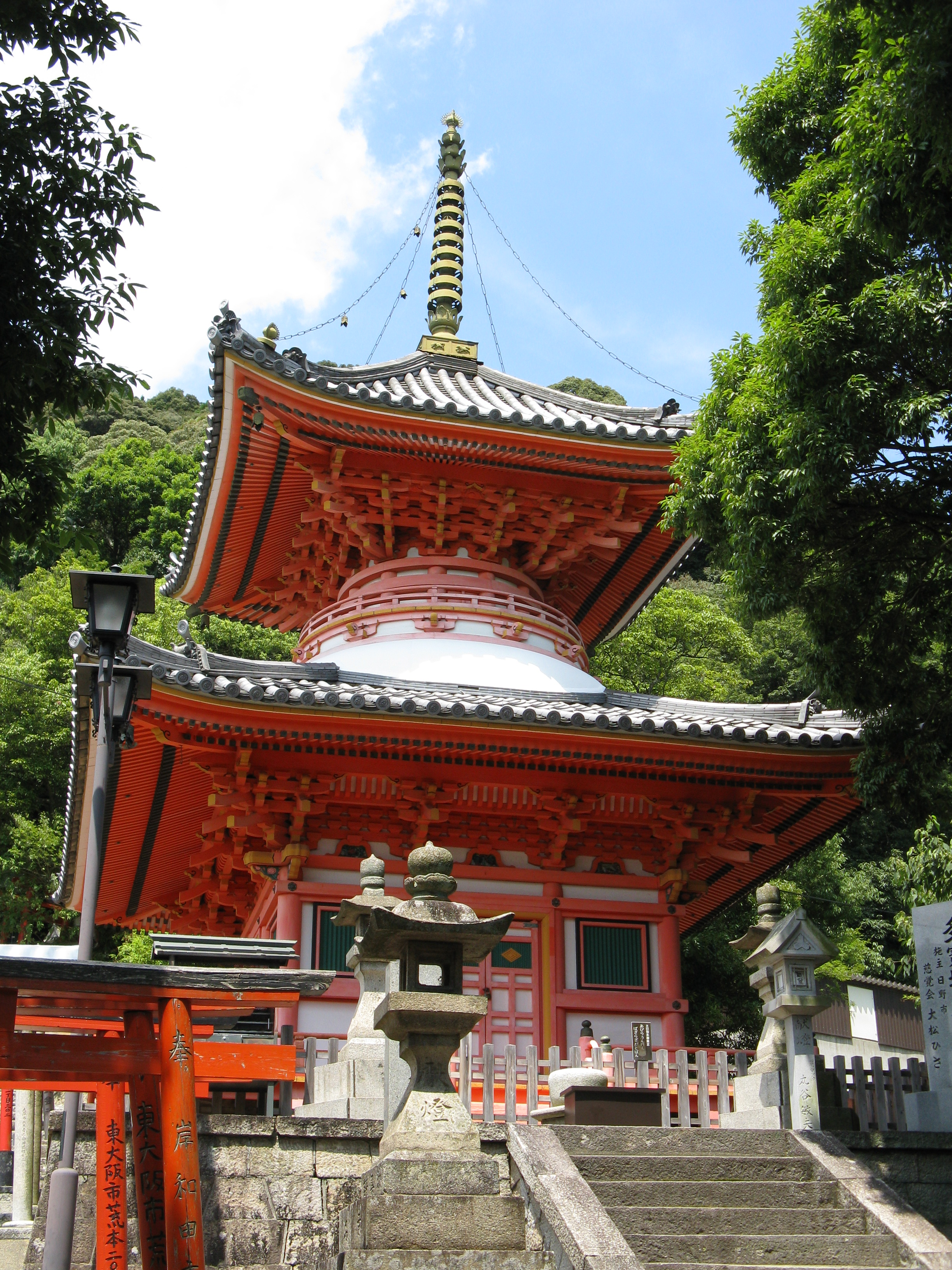
Tahōtō

== See also ==
- Historical Sites of Prince Shōtoku
- List of National Treasures of Japan (paintings)
