= Heguri, Nara =

Heguri 平群町
- Town
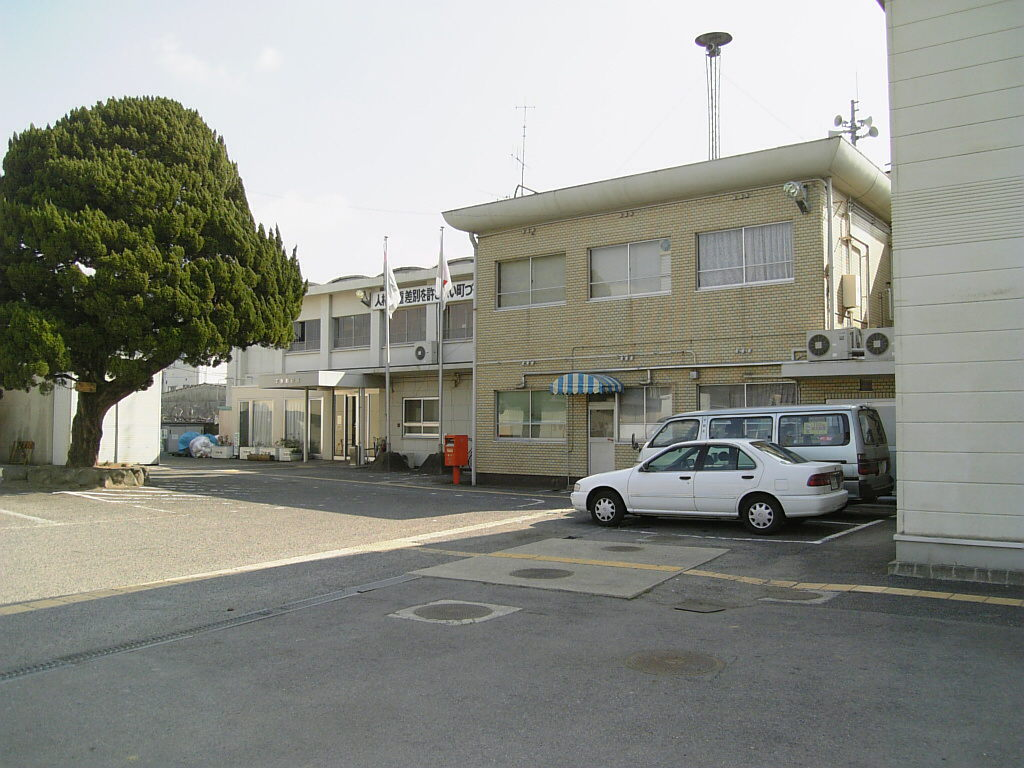
- Heguri Town Hall

- Flag Emblem
- Interactive map of Heguri
- Location in Japan
- Coordinates: 34°37′45″N 135°42′02″E
- Country: Japan
- Region: Kansai
- Prefecture: Nara
- District: Ikoma

Area
  - Total: 23.90 km^{2} (9.23 sq mi)

Population (November 1, 2024)
  - Total: 18,161
  - Density: 759.9/km^{2} (1,968/sq mi)
- Time zone: UTC+09:00 (JST)
- City hall address: 1-1 Yoshishin, Heguri-cho, Ikoma-gun, Nara-ken 635-8511
- Website: Official website
- Symbols
- Flower: Chrysanthemum
- Tree: Fagaceae

Heguri (平群町, Heguri-chō) is a town located in Ikoma District, Nara Prefecture, Japan. As of 1 December 2024, the town had an estimated population of 18,161 in 8227 households, and a population density of 760 persons per km^{2}. The total area of the town is 23.90 km^{2} (9.23 sq mi).

== Geography ==
Heguri is located in northwestern Nara Prefecture, in is a small plain surrounded by the Ikoma Mountains and Mount Shigi to the west and the Yata Hills to the east. The Tatsuta River flows south and empties into the Yamato River.

=== Surrounding municipalities ===
Nara Prefecture

- Ikoma
- Okaruga
- Sangō

Osaka Prefecture

- Higashiosaka
- Yao

=== Climate ===
Heguri has a humid subtropical climate (Köppen Cfa) characterized by warm summers and cool winters with light to no snowfall. The average annual temperature in Heguri is 14.6 °C. The average annual rainfall is 1356 mm with September as the wettest month. The temperatures are highest on average in August, at around 26.7 °C, and lowest in January, at around 3.1 °C.

=== Demographics ===
Per Japanese census data, the population of Heguri is as shown below

Historical population
Year	Pop.	±%
1940	5,342	—
1950	6,438	+20.5%
1960	6,141	−4.6%
1970	7,899	+28.6%
1980	16,854	+113.4%
1990	20,096	+19.2%
2000	20,497	+2.0%
2010	19,727	−3.8%
2020	18,009	−8.7%

== History ==
The area of Heguri was part of ancient Yamato Province, and contains many ancient kofun burial mounds and ancient Shinto shrines within its borders. The famous Buddhist temple of Chōgosonshi-ji is founded in the Asuka period is located in Heguri. During the Sengoku period, it was the location of Shigisan Castle, used by Matsunaga Hisahide used as a base for his conquest of Yamato.

The village of Meiji was established on April 1, 1889, with the creation of the modern municipalities system. It was renamed Heguri on September 1, 1896. Heguri was raised to town status on February 1, 1971.

== Government ==
Heguri has a mayor-council form of government with a directly elected mayor and a unicameral town council of 12 members. Heguri, collectively with the other municipalities of Ikoma District, contributes three members to the Nara Prefectural Assembly. In terms of national politics, the town is part of the Nara 2nd district of the lower house of the Diet of Japan.

== Economy ==
The local economy is based on agriculture and light manufacturing. The town is also a commuter town for the greater Osaka metropolis.

== Education ==
Heguri has three public elementary school and one public junior high schools operated by the town government. The town has one private international Christian school that serves students from elementary through high school.

== Transportation ==
=== Railways ===
Kintetsu Railway - Ikoma Line

Motosanjōguchi - Heguri - Tatsutagawa

=== Highways ===
- National Route 168

== Local attractions ==
- Chōgosonshi-ji
- Shigisan Gyokuzōin
- Shigisan Castle ruins
- Udozuka Kofun, National Historic Site
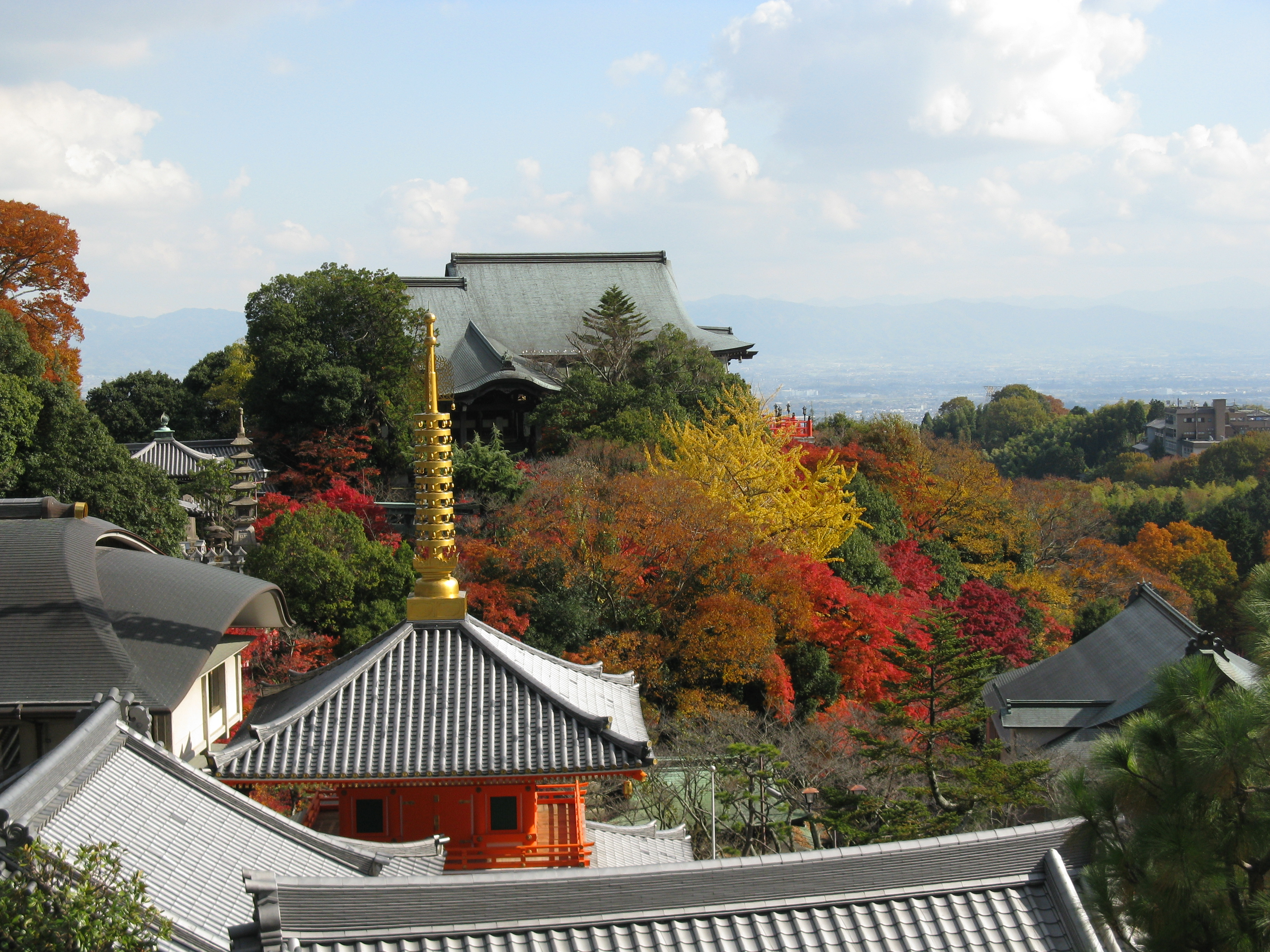
Chōgosonshi-ji

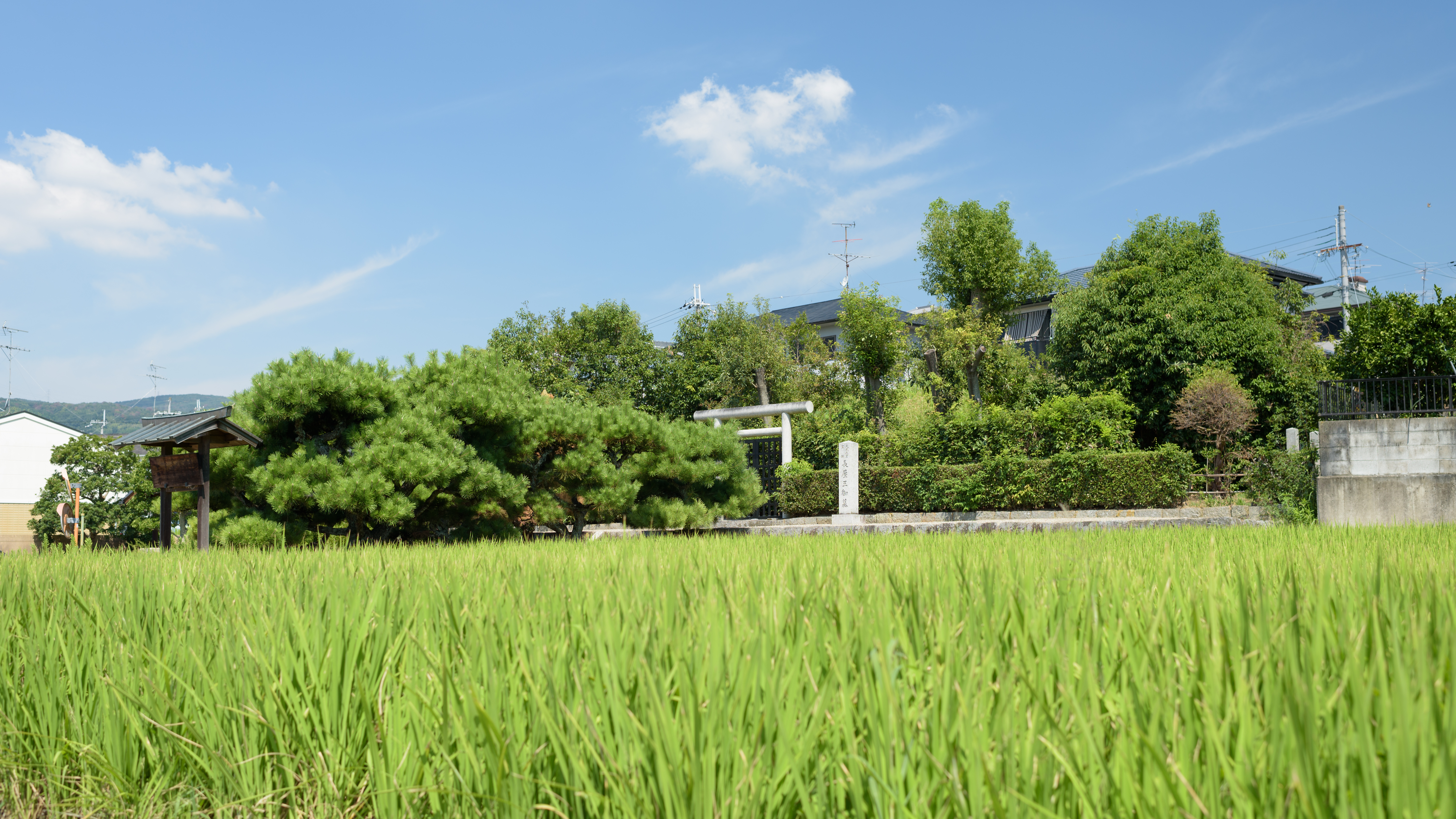
Tomb of Prince Nagaya
