= Minami-Ikoma Station =

Railway station in Ikoma, Nara Prefecture, Japan

Minami-Ikoma Station 南生駒駅
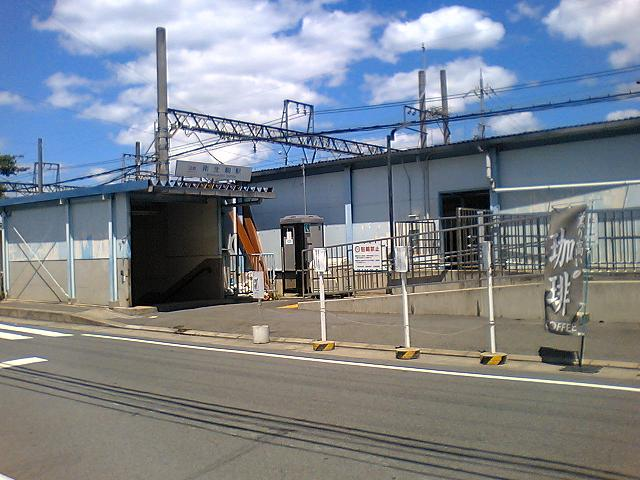
- West entrance in August, 2007

General information
- Location: 692-2, Oze-chō, Ikoma, Nara （奈良県生駒市小瀬町692-2） Japan
- Coordinates: 34°39′56″N 135°42′32″E
- Owner: Kintetsu Railway
- Operator: Kintetsu Railway
- Line: F Ikoma Line
- Distance: 8.9 km (5.5 miles) from Ōji
- Platforms: 2 side platforms
- Train operators: Kintetsu Railway
- Connections: Bus stop

Other information
- Station code: G20
- Website: www.kintetsu.co.jp/station/station_info/en_station08013.html

History
- Opened: 28 December 1926

Passengers
- 2019: 2887 daily
Services
Preceding station	Kintetsu Railway	Following station
Ichibu towards Ikoma	Ikoma Line Local	Haginodai towards Ōji
Location
- Location within Nara Prefecture Location within Japan

Minami-Ikoma Station (南生駒駅, Minami-Ikoma-eki) is a passenger railway station located in the city of Ikoma, Nara Prefecture, Japan. It is operated by the private transportation company, Kintetsu Railway.

== Line ==
Higashiyama Station is served by the Ikoma Line and is 8.9 kilometers from the starting point of the line at Ōji.

== Layout ==
Minami-Ikoma Station has two opposing side platforms and two tracks. The Ōji side has a single track, while the Ikoma side has a double track, allowing trains to pass each other. The effective length of the platform is four cars. There used is a maintenance siding on the east side of the Ikoma track. The ticket gates and concourse are underground, and the platform is above ground. There is only one ticket gate. There are entrances and exits on the sides of both platforms. The station is unattended.

=== Platforms ===
1	■ G Ikoma Line	for Ōji
2	■ G Ikoma Line	for Ikoma

== History ==
The station opened on 28 December 1926. The Shigiikoma Electric Railway was acquired by Kintetsu in 1964, becoming the Kintetsu Ikoma Line

== Passenger statistics ==
In fiscal 2019, the station was used by an average of 2887 passengers daily (boarding passengers only).

== Surrounding area ==
- Japan National Route 308
- Chikurin-ji
- Ikoma City Ikoma Minami Junior High School
- Ikoma City Ikoma Minami Elementary School

== See also ==
- List of railway stations in Japan
