= Sangō, Nara =

Sangō 三郷町
- Town
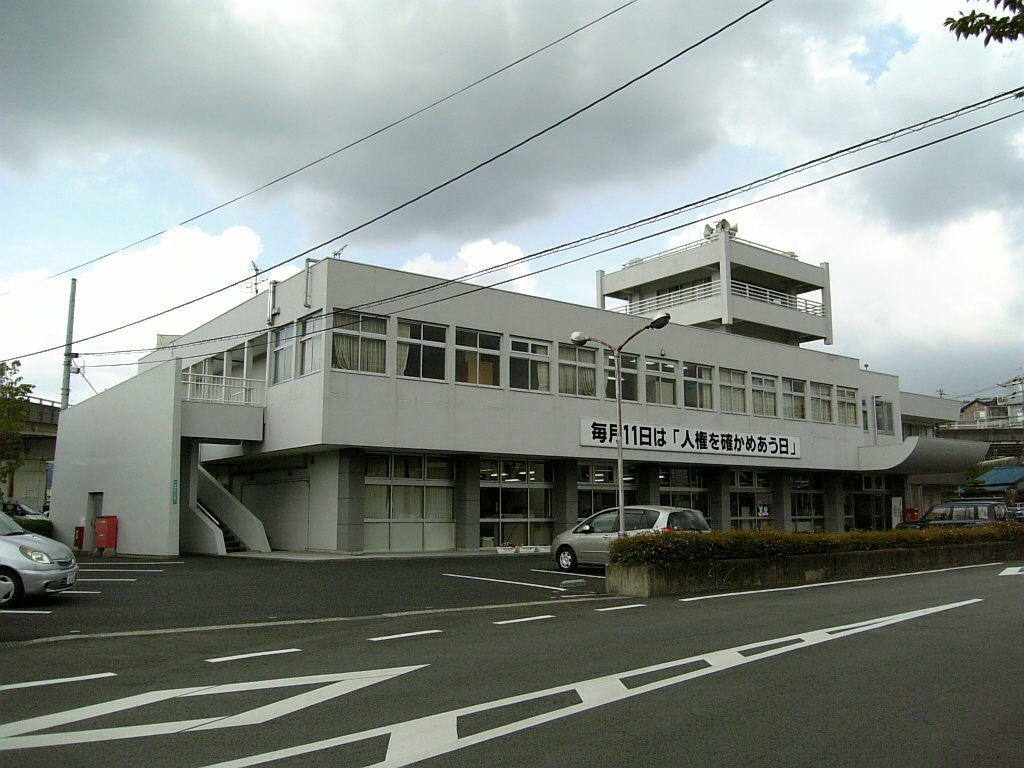
- Sango Town Office

- Flag Seal
- Location of Sangō in Nara Prefecture

- Location in Japan
- Coordinates: 34°36′01″N 135°41′44″E
- Country: Japan
- Region: Kansai
- Prefecture: Nara
- District: Ikoma

Area
  - Total: 8.79 km^{2} (3.39 sq mi)

Population (April 1, 2023)
  - Total: 22,529
  - Density: 2,560/km^{2} (6,640/sq mi)
- Time zone: UTC+09:00 (JST)
- City hall address: 1-1-1 Seyanishi, Sangō-chō, Ikoma-gun, Nara-ken 636-8535
- Website: Official website
- Symbols
- Flower: Sunflower
- Tree: Maple

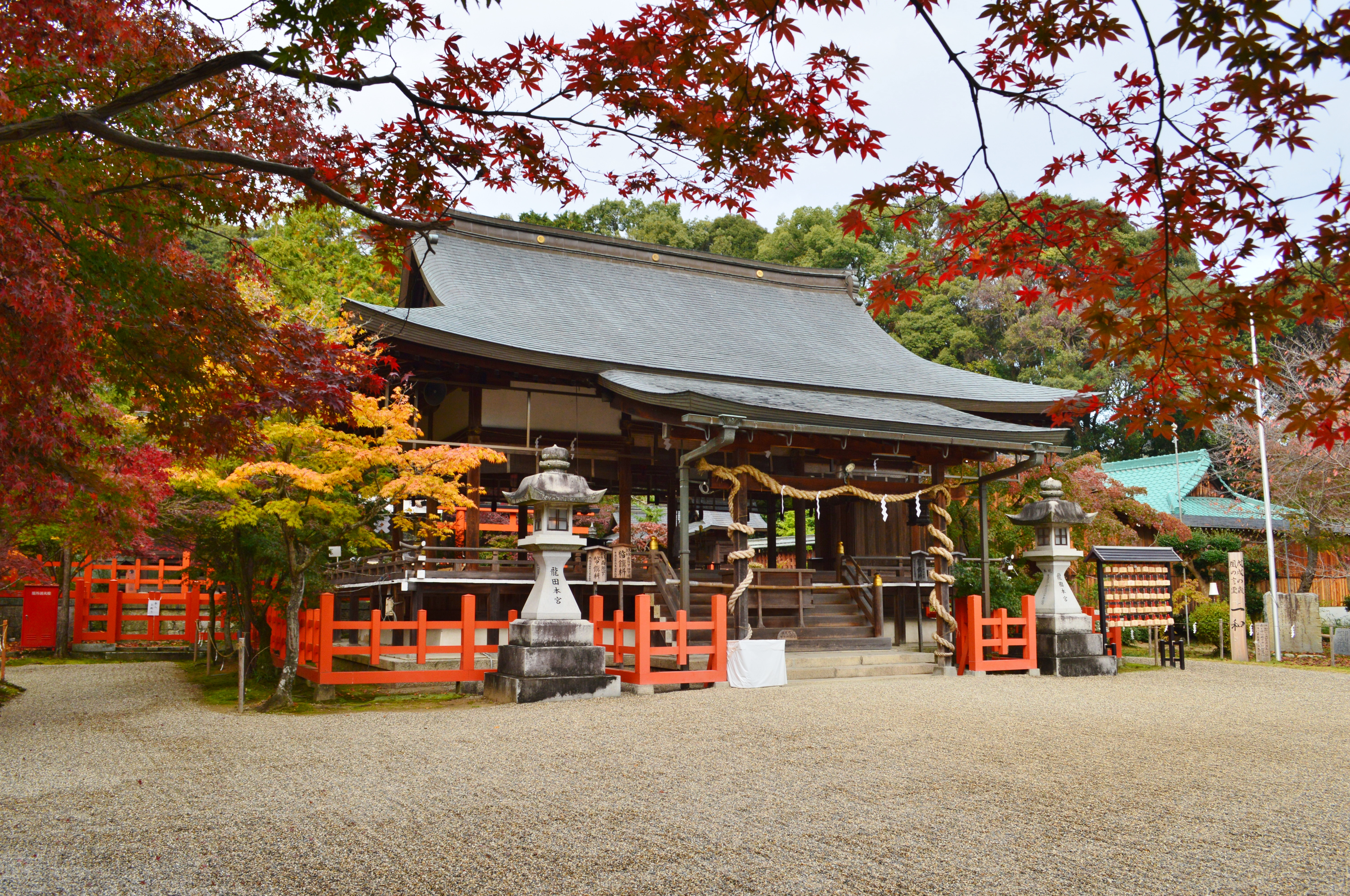
Tasuta Taisha

Sangō (三郷町, Sangō-chō) is a town located in Ikoma District, Nara Prefecture, Japan. As of 1 April 2024, the town had an estimated population of 22,529 in 10,673 households, and a population density of 2600 persons per km^{2}. The total area of the town is 8.79 km^{2} (3.39 sq mi)

== Geography ==
Sangō is located in western Nara Prefecture, sitting right next to the border with Osaka Prefecture, the Yamato River flows through. The majority of the land is flat, as like other municipalities in the Nara Basin. However, the Ikoma Mountain Range situated in the western portion of the town, on the border between Osaka Prefecture.

=== Neighboring municipalities ===
Nara Prefecture

- Heguri
- Ikaruga
- Ōji

Osaka Prefecture

- Yao
- Kashihara

=== Climate ===
Sangō has a humid subtropical climate (Köppen Cfa) characterized by warm summers and cool winters with light to no snowfall. The average annual temperature in Sangō is 14.6 °C. The average annual rainfall is 1636 mm with September as the wettest month. The temperatures are highest on average in August, at around 26.7 °C, and lowest in January, at around 3.1 °C.

=== Demographics ===
Per Japanese census data, the population of Sangō is as shown below:

Historical population
Year	Pop.	±%
1940	5,273	—
1950	6,538	+24.0%
1960	6,723	+2.8%
1970	10,023	+49.1%
1980	17,949	+79.1%
1990	23,123	+28.8%
2000	23,977	+3.7%
2010	23,440	−2.2%
2020	23,219	−0.9%

== History ==
The area of Sangō is part of ancient Yamato Province. The village of Sangō was established on April 1, 1889, with the creation of the modern municipalities system. It was raised to town status on April 1, 1966.

== Government ==
Sangō has a mayor-council form of government with a directly elected mayor and a unicameral town council of 13 members. Sangō, collectively with the other municipalities of Ikaruga District contributes two members to the Nara Prefectural Assembly. In terms of national politics, the town is part of the Nara 2nd district of the lower house of the Diet of Japan.

== Economy ==
Sangō has a mixed economy of agriculture and light manufacturing. Due to its location, the town is increasing becoming a commuter town for the greater Osaka metropolis.

== Education ==
Sangō has two public elementary schools and one public junior high school operated by the town government and one public high school operated by the Nara Prefectural Board of Education.

== Transportation ==
=== Railways ===
JR West - Kansai Main Line (Yamatoji Line)

Q Sangō

Kintetsu Railway - Ikoma Line

Shigisanshita - Seya-Kitaguchi

=== Highways ===
- National Route 25
- National Route 168

== Local attractions ==
- Tatsuta Taisha
- Mount Shigi
