= Tatsuta River =

River in Nara Prefecture

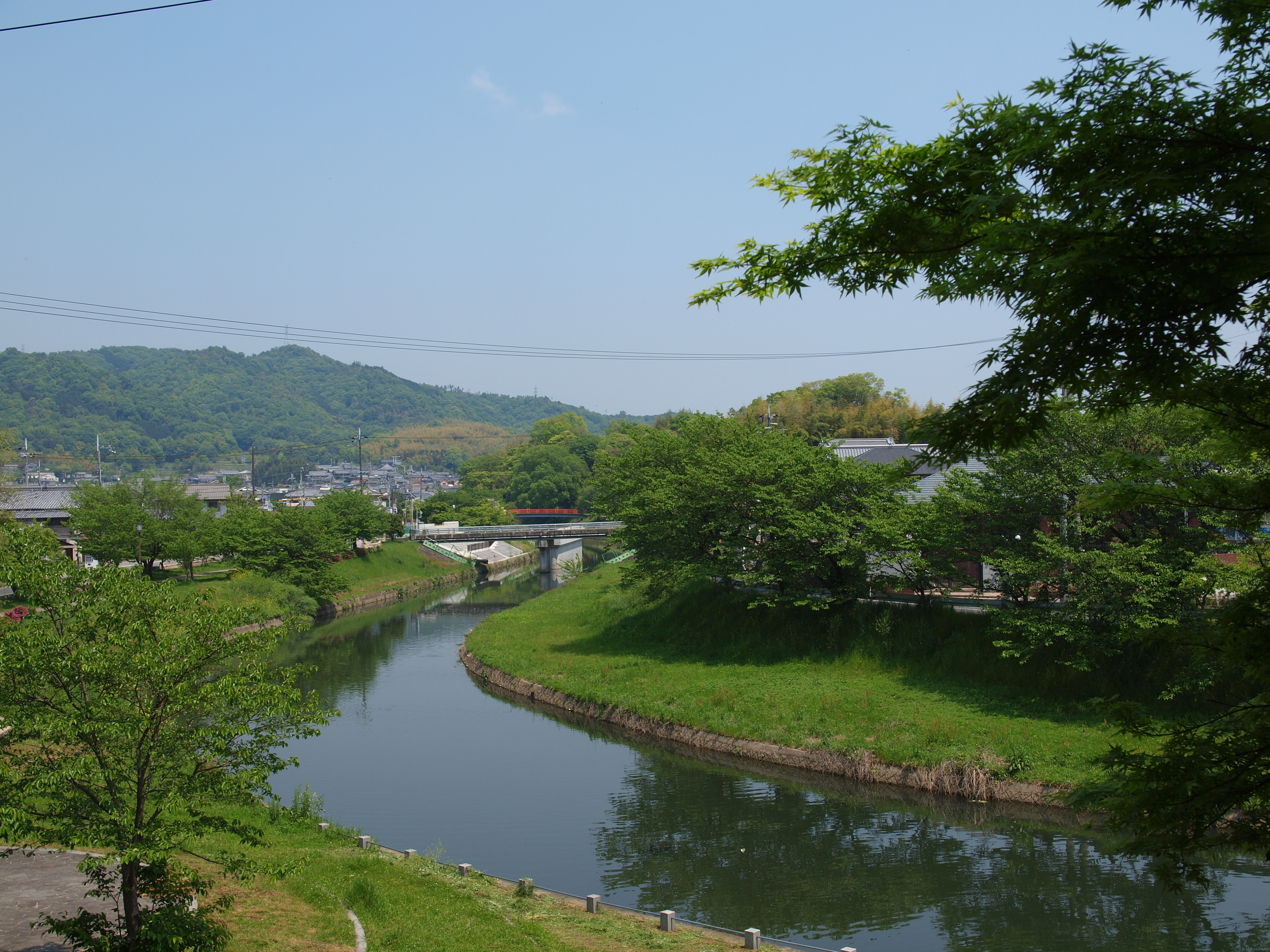
- Late April, Ikaruga-cho, Ikoma-gun, Nara Prefecture

- Location within Japan
- Native name: 竜田川 (Japanese)

Physical characteristics
- Source: Mt. Ikoma
  - location: Border of Osaka Prefecture and Nara Prefecture
  - coordinates: 34°40′42.43″N 135°40′44.29″E
  - elevation: 642 m (2,106 ft)
- Mouth: Yamato River
- Length: 15 km (9.3 mi)

Basin features
- River system: Yamato River system

The Tatsuta River (Jap. 竜田川 or たつたがわ, Tatsuta-gawa) is a river in Japan that is a tributary of the Yamato River system. The upper stream is also called the Ikoma River (after Ikoma City), and the middle stream is referred to as the Heguri River (after Heguri).

== Geography ==
The river flows south from the eastern foot of Mt. Ikoma (altitude 642 m), near the border between Osaka Prefecture and Nara Prefecture, and joins the Yamato River at Ikaruga, Nara Prefecture. The catchment area is about 54 km^{2} (21 sq mi), and the channel length is about 15 km (9.3 mi).

The Tatsuta River has long been known as the 'Heiguri River'. In the Edo period, the area near Tatsuta was called 'Tatsuta River' or 'Nishino Okawa', and the area near Mt. Mimuro was called 'Shiota River'. The river was mentioned in Japanese poems of the Heian period, but this 'Tatsuta River' refers to the vicinity of Kamenose, the main stream of the Yamato River.

Along the Tatsuta River in Ikaruga Town, Nara Prefectural Tatsuta Park has been developed as an urban green area for about 2 km (1.2 mi). Every year from late November to early December, the Momiji Festival is held at Tatsuta Park.

The river has also flood-prone areas, and there have been instances of flood damage caused by torrential rains in August 1992, August 1999, July 2000, and June 2016.

=== Municipalities ===
Nara Prefecture

- Ikoma City (source)
- Heguri
- Ikaruga

== History ==
The river is also known as a famous spot for maple trees since ancient times, which were planted in the Edo period with the advice of Shusei Fujimon, a scholar of Japanese classical literature, and the support of Chūgū-ji Temple. Around 1889 (Meiji 22), there were about 36 maple trees, but 6,000 maple trees were replanted from the mountainous area of Uda.

There is a theory that the name of Tatsuta-age is derived from the fact that it resembles the color of autumn leaves in this river. The river is also mentioned in Famous Views of the Sixty-odd Provinces. However, it is an accepted theory that the 'Tatsuta River' at that time was not the current Tatsuta River (Hegurusu River), but the main stream of the Yamato River from Tateno, Misato-cho to the border of Osaka Prefecture.

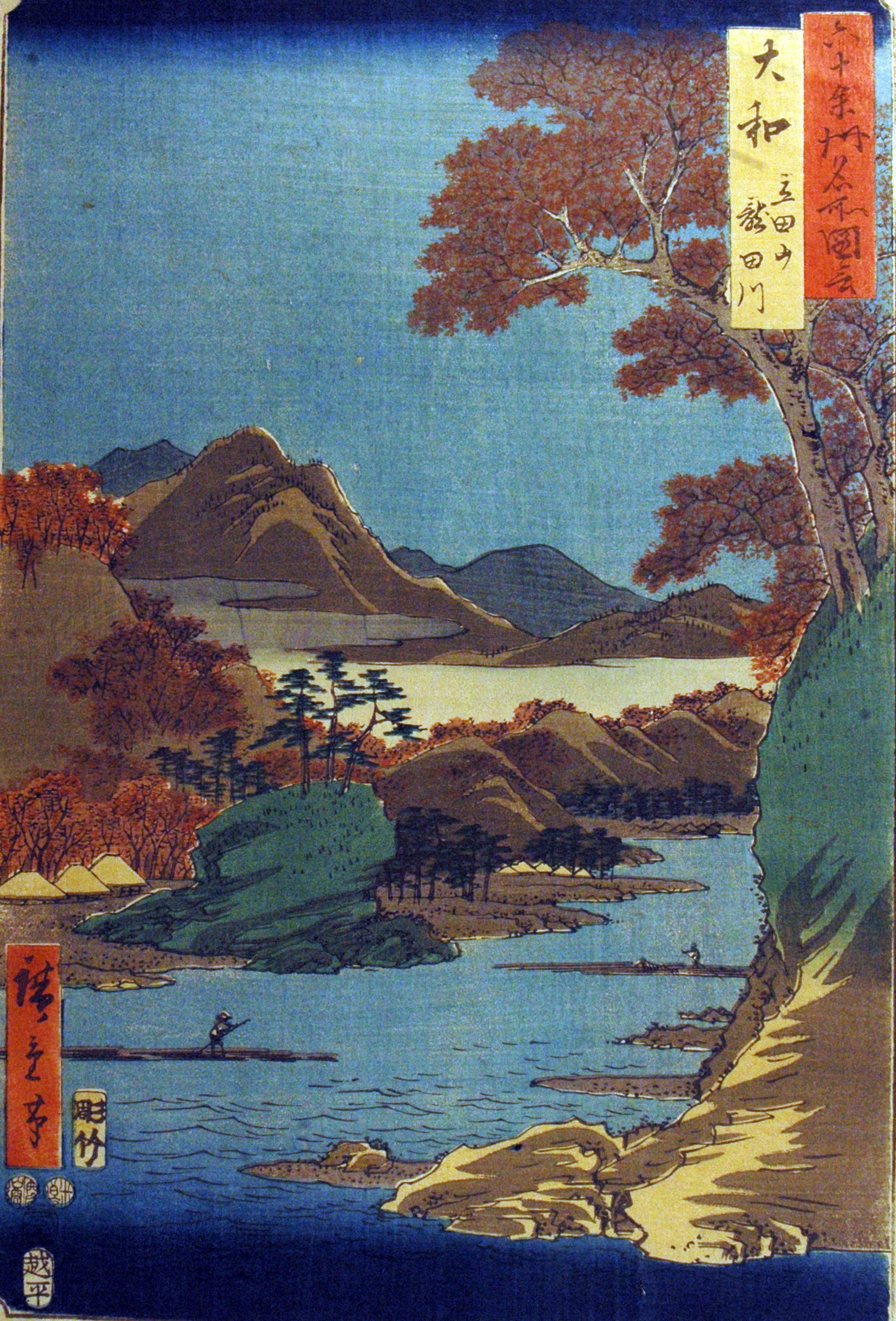
Tatsuta River in Famous Views of the Sixty-odd Provinces.

On Wednesday, 5 July 2023, the river turned bright lime green due to traces of sodium fluorescein, a component of coloring agents in bath salts.
