= Nara Gakuen University =

Coordinates: 34°35′44″N 135°40′41″E

- 奈良学園大学
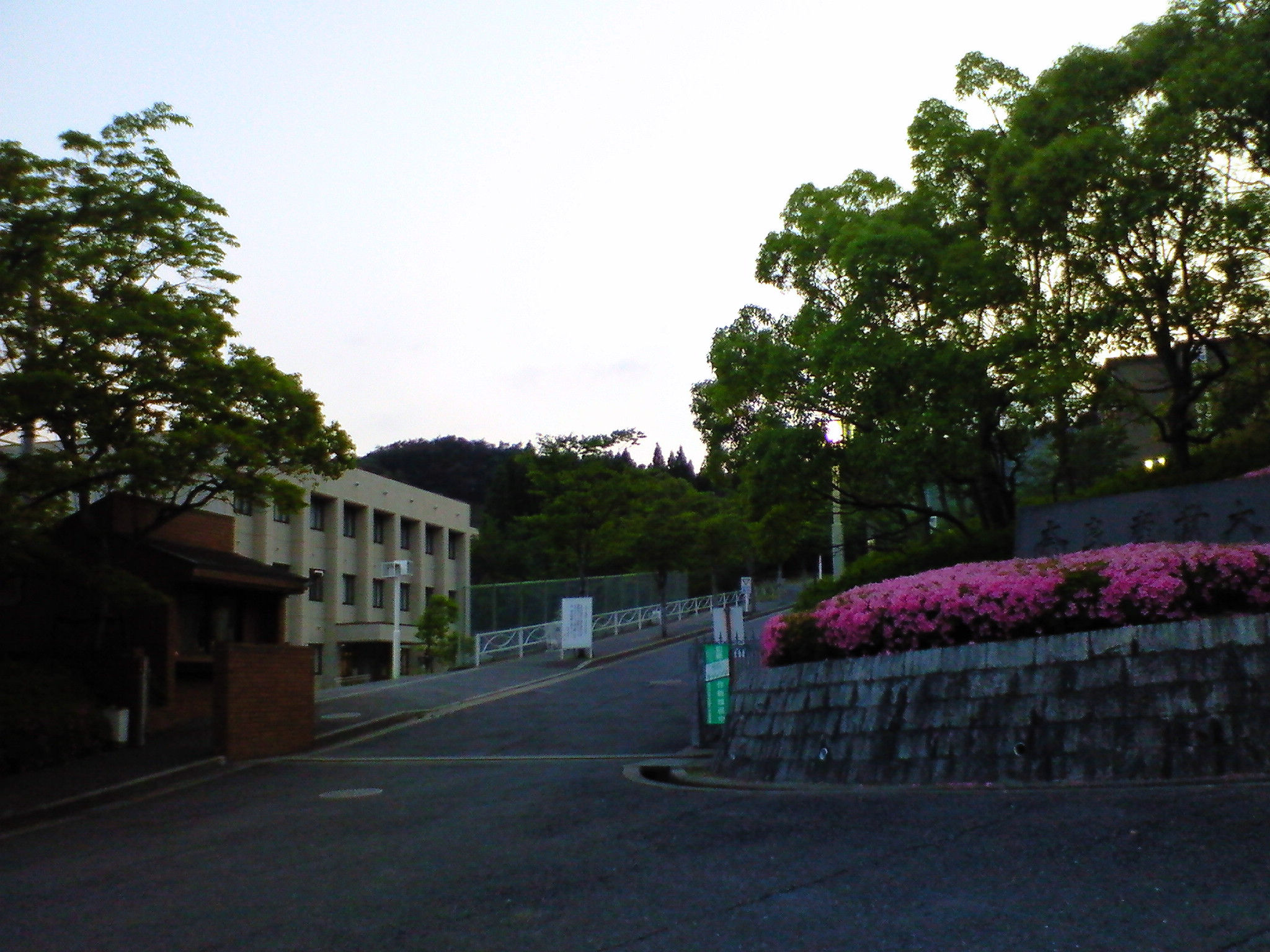
- Type: Private
- Established: 1984
- President: Eiichi Kajita
- Location: Sangō, Nara, Japan
- Website: Official website

Nara Gakuen University (奈良学園大学, Nara Gakuen Daigaku) is a private university in the town of Sangō in Nara Prefecture, Japan, established in 1984 as Nara Sangyo University (奈良産業大学). In 2014, the University has adopted the new name as Nara Gakuen University.
