= Ikoma Line =

Railway line in Nara, Japan

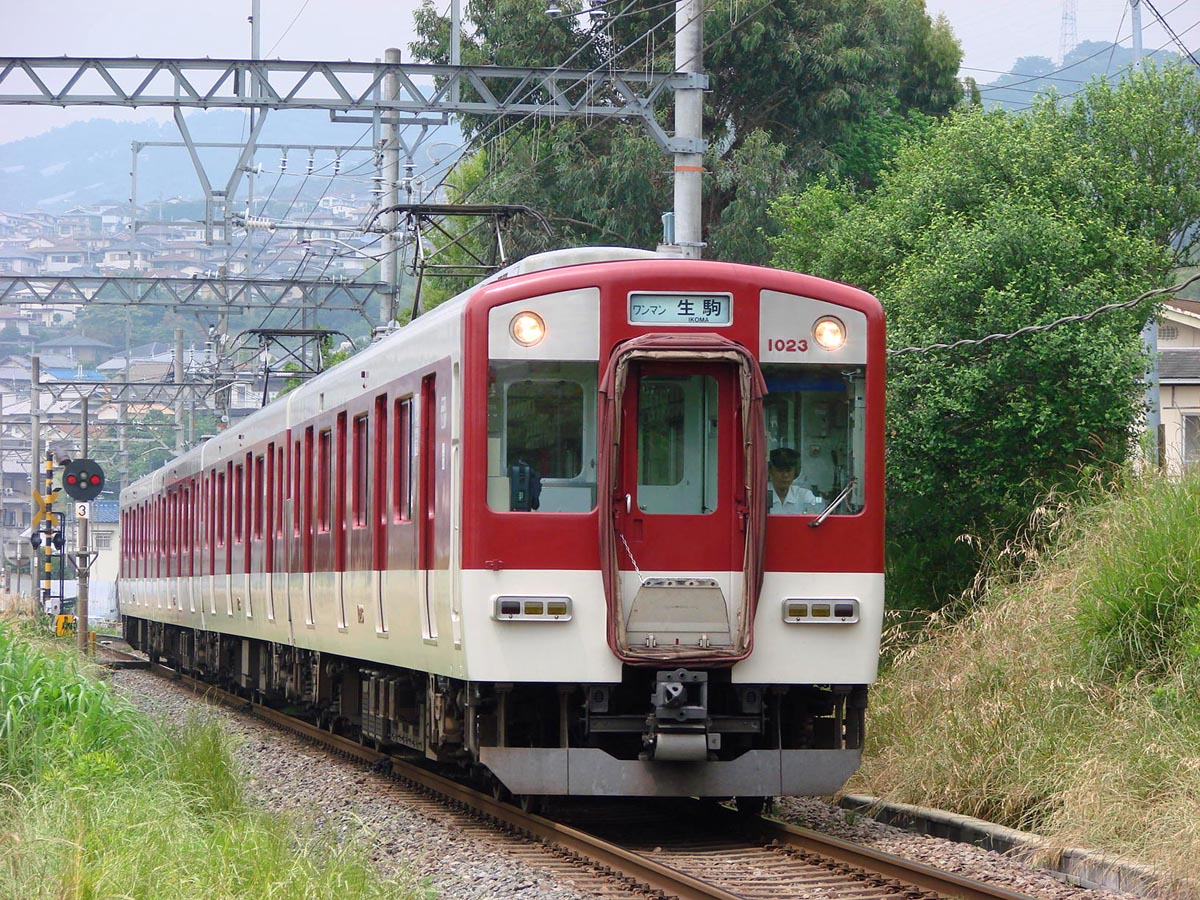
- 1020 series EMU on a one-manned Local train

Overview
- Native name: 生駒線
- Owner: Kintetsu Railway
- Line number: G
- Locale: Nara Prefecture, Japan
- Termini: Ōji; Ikoma
- Stations: 12
- Color on map: (#c22047)

Service
- Type: Commuter rail
- System: Kintetsu Railway
- Operator: Kintetsu Railway

History
- Opened: May 26, 1922; 104 years ago

Technical
- Track length: 12.4 km (7.7 mi)
- Character: Commuter rail
- Track gauge: 1,435 mm (4 ft 8 1/2 in) standard gauge
- Electrification: 1,500 V DC (overhead lines)
- Operating speed: 65 km/h (40 mph)
- Signalling: Automatic closed block
- Train protection system: Kintetsu ATS

The Ikoma Line (生駒線, Ikoma-sen) is a railway line of Kintetsu Railway in Nara Prefecture, Japan connecting Ikoma Station in the city of Ikoma and Ōji Station in the town of Ōji. Having a total length of 12.4 km (7.7 mi), the entirely electrified standard gauge line is partially double-tracked. All trains stop at all 12 stations (including both termini) along the line.

== History ==
The Nobutaka Ikoma Electric Railway Co. opened the line in 1922, electrified at 600 VDC. The company merged with Kintetsu in 1964, and in 1969 the voltage was raised to 1500 VDC.

The Minami Ikoma - Nabatake section was duplicated in 1977, the Higashiyama - Haginodai section in 1993 and Nabatake - Ikoma in 1994.

With the change of the timetable on March 14, 2020, the slow section between Seya-Kitaguchi and Tatsutagawa Stations has ended, and four trains per hour run in the morning and evening hours has been implemented throughout the entire line.

On May 16, 2022, in commemoration of the 100th anniversary of the opening of the Ikoma Line, a special express train was operated between Oji Station and Osaka-Uehonmachi Station.

== Stations ==
| No. | Name | | Between (km) | Distance (km) | Connections | Location | |
|---|---|---|---|---|---|---|---|
| G17 | Ikoma | 生駒 | - | 0.0 | Kintetsu Railway: A Nara Line; C Keihanna Line; Y Ikoma Cable Line | Ikoma | Nara |
| G18 | Nabata | 菜畑 | 1.2 | 1.2 | | Ikoma | Nara |
| G19 | Ichibu | 一分 | 1.1 | 2.3 | | Ikoma | Nara |
| G20 | Minami-Ikoma | 南生駒 | 1.2 | 3.5 | | Ikoma | Nara |
| G21 | Haginodai | 萩の台 | 1.0 | 4.5 | | Ikoma | Nara |
| G22 | Higashiyama | 東山 | 0.9 | 5.4 | | Ikoma | Nara |
| G23 | Motosanjoguchi | 元山上口 | 1.3 | 6.7 | | Heguri, Ikoma District | Nara |
| G24 | Heguri | 平群 | 1.2 | 7.9 | | Heguri, Ikoma District | Nara |
| G25 | Tatsutagawa | 竜田川 | 1.4 | 9.3 | | Heguri, Ikoma District | Nara |
| G26 | Seya-Kitaguchi | 勢野北口 | 1.4 | 10.7 | | Sangō, Ikoma District | Nara |
| G27 | Shigisanshita | 信貴山下 | 0.8 | 11.5 | | Sangō, Ikoma District | Nara |
| G28 | Ōji | 王寺 | 0.9 | 12.4 | I Tawaramoto Line; JR West: Q Yamatoji Line; T Wakayama Line | Ōji, Kitakatsuragi | Nara |

=== Connections ===
The Ikoma line connects to the following railway lines:

- At Ikoma Station
  - Nara Line
  - Keihanna Line
  - Ikoma Cable Line (Cable Line station is called Toriimae Station.)
- At Ōji Station
  - Tawaramoto Line (Tawaramoto Line station is called Shin-Ōji Station.)
  - West Japan Railway (JR-West) Yamatoji Line (Kansai Main Line)
  - West Japan Railway (JR-West) Wakayama Line
