= Ikoma Station =

Railway and funicular station in Ikoma, Nara Prefecture, Japan

Ikoma Station 生駒駅
- Ikoma Station exterior (December 2021)

General information
- Location: 1-1-1, Motomachi, Ikoma, Nara （奈良県生駒市元町一丁目1-1） Japan
- Coordinates: 34°41′35.45″N 135°41′52.86″E
- Operator: Kintetsu Railway
- Lines: Nara Line; Ikoma Line; Keihanna Line; Ikoma Cable Line (Toriimae Station)
- Connections: Bus terminal

Other information
- Station code: A17 (Nara Line); G17 (Ikoma Line); C27 (Keihanna Line); Y17 (Ikoma Cable Line)

History
- Opened: April 30, 1914
- Former names: Ikoma; Daiki Ikoma Station; Kankyu Ikoma Station; Kinki Nippon Ikoma (until 1964)

Services
Preceding station	Kintetsu Railway	Following station
Ishikiri towards Ōsaka Uehommachi	Nara Line Local Semi-Express Suburban Semi-Express	Higashi-Ikoma towards Kintetsu Nara
Ishikiri towards Ōsaka Uehommachi	Nara Line Express	Gakuen-mae towards Kintetsu Nara
Tsuruhashi towards Ōsaka Uehommachi	Nara Line Rapid Express Limited Express	Gakuen-mae towards Kintetsu Nara
Terminus	Ikoma Line	Nabata towards Ōji
Shin-Ishikiri towards Yumeshima	Keihanna Line	Shiraniwadai towards Gakken Nara-Tomigaoka
Terminus	Ikoma Cable Line	Hozanji towards Ikoma-Sanjo
Location

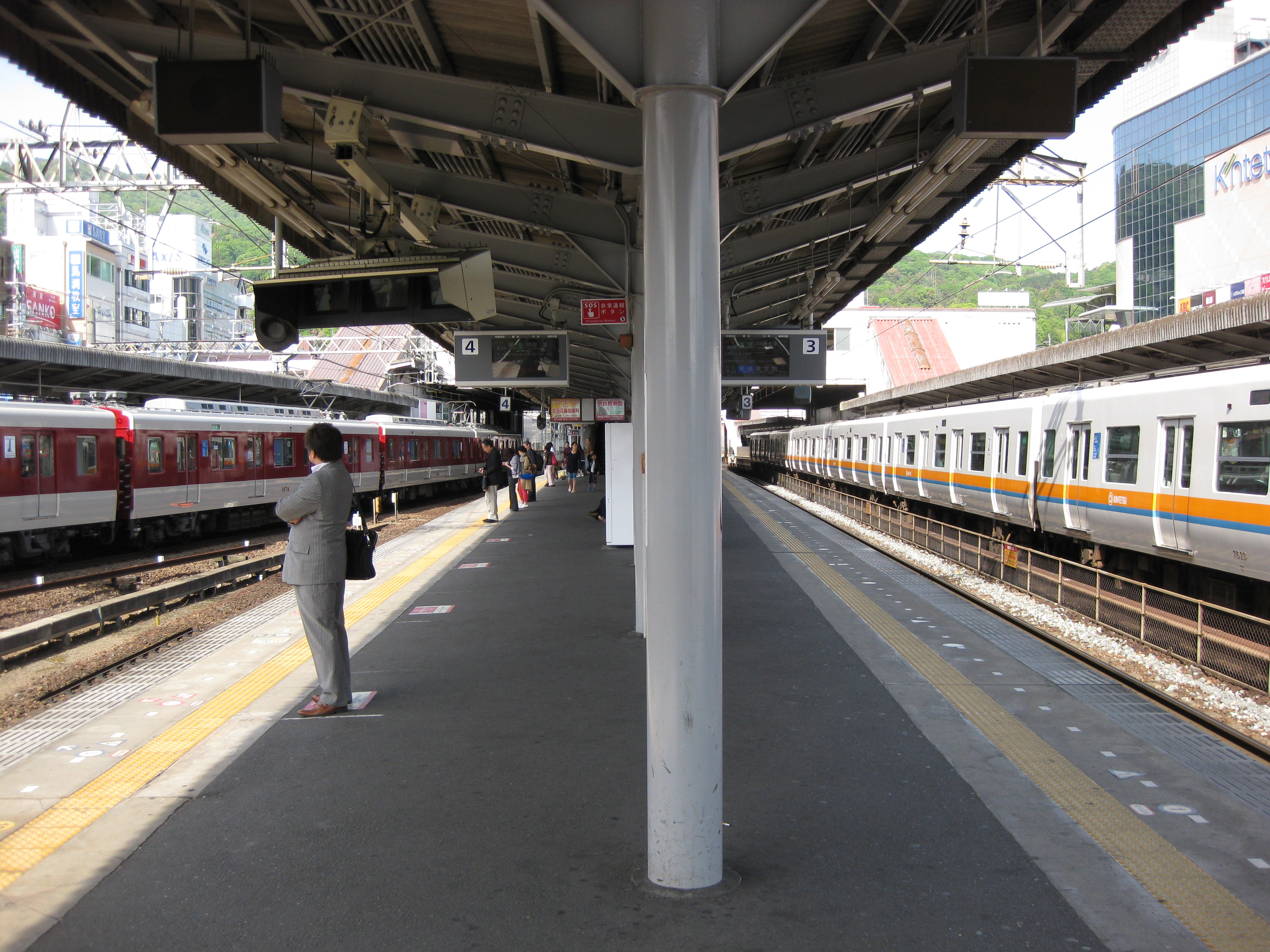
Platforms 3 and 4 (Nara Line)

Ikoma Station (生駒駅) is a railway station in Ikoma, Nara Prefecture, Japan.

== Lines ==
- Kintetsu Railway
  - ■ Nara Line (A17)
  - ■ Ikoma Line (G17)
  - ■ Keihanna Line (C27)
  - Ikoma Cable Line (Y17: Toriimae Station, 鳥居前駅)

== Layout ==
Ikoma Station

- 3 island platforms serving six tracks are located under the station building.

1	■ Keihanna Line	for Gakken Nara-Tomigaoka
2	■ Keihanna Line	for Nagata, Tanimachi Yonchome, Hommachi, and Yumeshima
3	■ Nara Line	for Gakuen-mae, Yamato-Saidaiji, Nara, Tenri and Kyoto
4	■ Nara Line	for Fuse, Osaka Uehommachi, Osaka Namba, Amagasaki, Koshien and Kobe Sannomiya
5, 6	■ Ikoma Line	for Minami-Ikoma, Shigisanshita and Ōji

Toriimae Station

- 3 platforms serving two tracks are located on the ground level.

1	for Hozanji and Ikoma-sanjo (usually operated)
2	for Hozanji and Ikoma-sanjo (extra)

== History ==
- April 30, 1914 - The station started operating as a station of Osaka Electric Tramway Company
- December 28, 1926 - Shigi Ikoma Electric Railway Company begins operating
- March 15, 1941 - Daiki merged with Sangu Kyuko Electric Railway Company, and was renamed Kansai Kyuko Electric Railway Company.
- June 1, 1944 - Kankyu merged Nankai Railway, and was renamed Kinki Nippon Railway Co., Ltd. (Kintetsu)
- October 1, 1964 - Shigi Ikoma merged with Kintetsu.
- October 1, 1986 - The Higashi-Osaka Line opened.
- June 28, 2003 - Kinki Nippon Railway Co., Ltd. was renamed Kintetsu Corporation.
- March 27, 2006 - The Keihanna Line began operating. The Higashi-Osaka Line was merged with the Keihanna Line
- April 1, 2007 - The station started accepting PiTaPa.

== Main surroundings ==
It is the main station in the surrounding area and is home to many public facilities. It is also one of the upper class district in the Kansai region, with department stores and educational facilities.

North

- Antre Ikoma
  - Kintetsu Department Store
  - Mizuho Bank
  - Restaurants
  - Keirindō Shoten(book store)
- Beruterasu Ikoma (plaza)
  - Kinshō Store (groceries store)
  - restaurants
  - Library
- Sumitomo Mitsui Banking Corporation
- KONAMI Sports Club
- Ikoma Post Office
  - Japan Post Service Ikoma
  - Japan Post Bank Ikoma

South

- Ikoma City Hall
- Green Hill Ikoma
  - Supermarket KINSHO
- Kakinohazushi

== Bus stops ==
Buses are operated by Nara Kotsu Bus Lines Co., Ltd.

=== North side ===
- Bus Stop 1 (for Kitanjo, Kita-Tawara and Gakken Kita-Ikoma)
  - Route 77 (Ikomadai Outer Loop) for Kitanjo
  - Route 82 for Kita-Tawara via Kitanjo
  - Route 84 (midnight bus) for Ikomadai via Kitanjo and Shin-Ikomadai-kitaguchi
  - Route 189 for Gakken Kita-Ikoma via Kitanjo, Shin-Ikomadai-kitaguchi and Shiraniwadai Jutaku
- Bus Stop 2 (for Ikomadai)
  - Route 78 (Ikomadai Inner Loop) for Ikomadai
  - Route 80 for Shin-Ikomadai-kitaguchi via Ikomadai
  - Ikoma City Community Bus "Takemaru" for Koyodai-chuo-koen

=== South side ===
- Bus Stop 1 (for Higashi-Ikoma, Oze, Inakura and Asukano)
  - Route 63 for Oze Hoken Fukushi Zone via Higashi-Ikoma and Satsukidai Jutaku
  - Route 64 for Asukano Center via Higashi-Ikoma and Satsukidai Jutaku
  - Route 65 for Asukano Center and Asukano-minami via Higashi-Ikoma and Satsukidai Jutaku
  - Route 90 for Naka-Nabata Nichome
  - Route 165 for Shiraniwadai via Higashi-Ikoma, Inakura and Asukano Center
  - Route 168 for Hikarigaoka via Higashi-Ikoma, Inakura, Asukano Center and Shiraniwadai
  - Ikoma City Community Bus "Takemaru" for Ikoma City Hall
- Bus Stop 2 (for Tawaradai)
  - Route 79 for Tawaradai Itchome via Kitatani-koen
  - Route 85 for Tawaradai Kyuchome-nishi via Tawaradai Hatchome
  - Route 86 for Tawaradai Itchome via Tawaradai Hatchome
  - Route 96 for Tawaradai Itchome via Tawaradai Hatchome and Tawaradai Kyuchome-nishi
- Tawaradai is a district in Shijonawate, Osaka Prefecture.
