= Japan National Route 168 =

National highway in Japan

National Route 168
- 国道168号
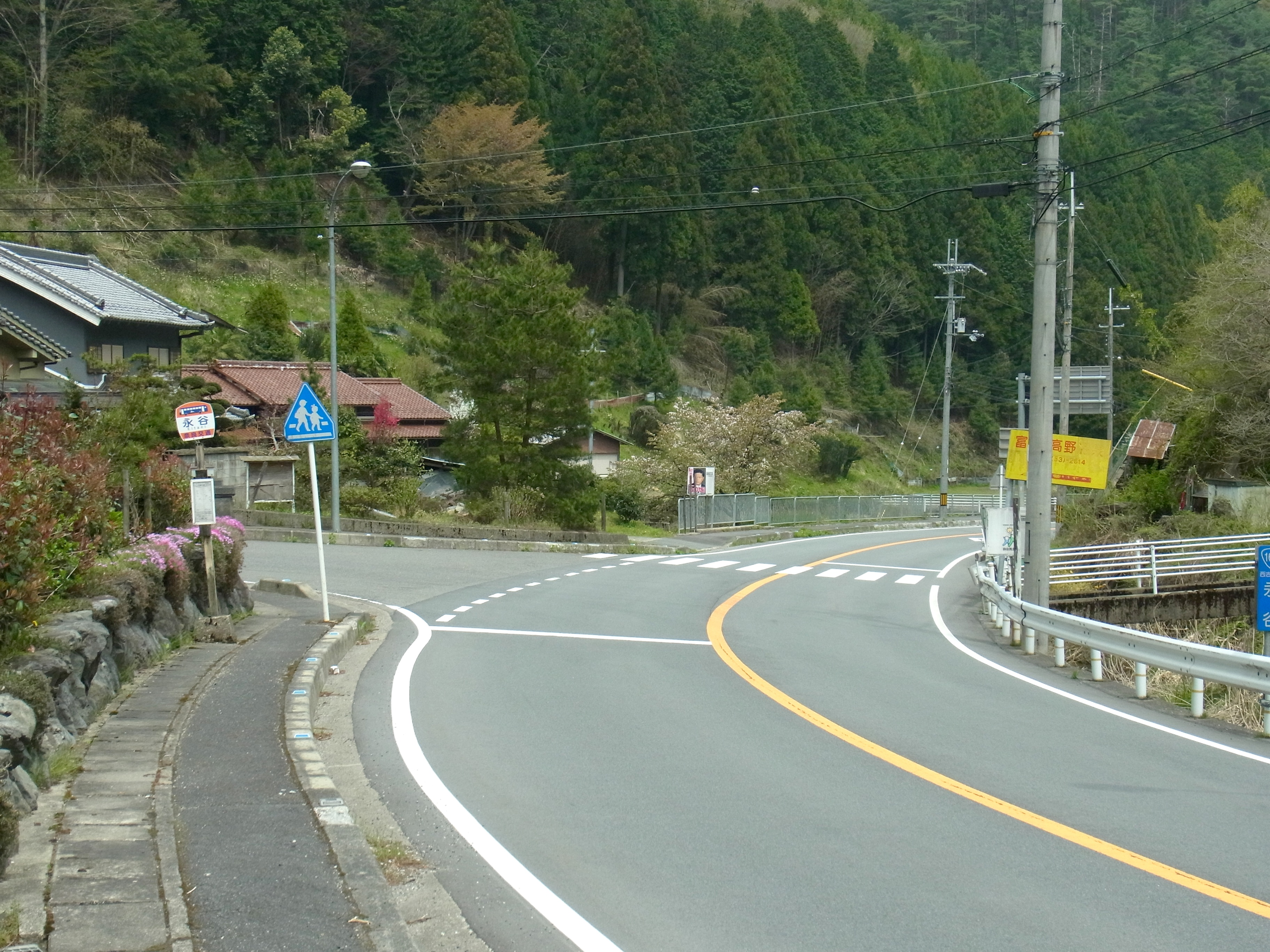

Route information
- Length: 194.8 km (121.0 mi)
- Existed: 1953–present

Major junctions
- south end: Shingū, Wakayama; Hashimoto Intersection (33°43′9″N 135°59′13.07″E)
- National Route 42; National Route 24; National Route 165; National Route 25; National Route 163; National Route 1
- north end: Hirakata, Osaka; Amanogawa Intersection (34°48′29.91″N 135°39′23.59″E)

Location
- Country: Japan

Highway system
- National highways of Japan; Expressways of Japan
← National Route 167	→ National Route 169

National Route 168 (国道168号, Kokudō Hyaku-rokujū-hachi-gō) is a national highway of Japan connecting Shingū, Wakayama and Hirakata, Osaka in Japan, with a total length of 194.8 km (121.04 mi).

A landslide occurred on August 10, 2004 on that road.
