= Ikoma District, Nara =

District in Nara Prefecture, Japan

Coordinates: 34°37′29″N 135°42′11″E

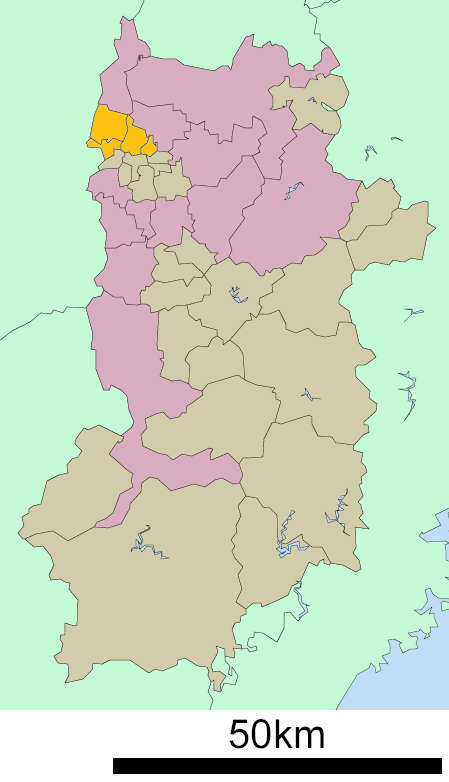
Location of Ikoma District in Nara Prefecture

Ikoma (生駒郡, Ikoma-gun) is a district located in Nara Prefecture, Japan.

As of 2020, the district has an estimated population of 76,040 people and a population density of 1,483 persons per km^{2}. The total area is 51.27 km^{2}.

== Towns and villages ==
- Ando
- Heguri
- Ikaruga
- Sangō

== Notable people ==
- Kenichi Fukui, chemist, 1981 Nobel Prize in Chemistry winner.
