= Shiraniwadai Station =

Railway station in Ikoma, Nara Prefecture, Japan

Shiraniwadai Station 白庭台駅
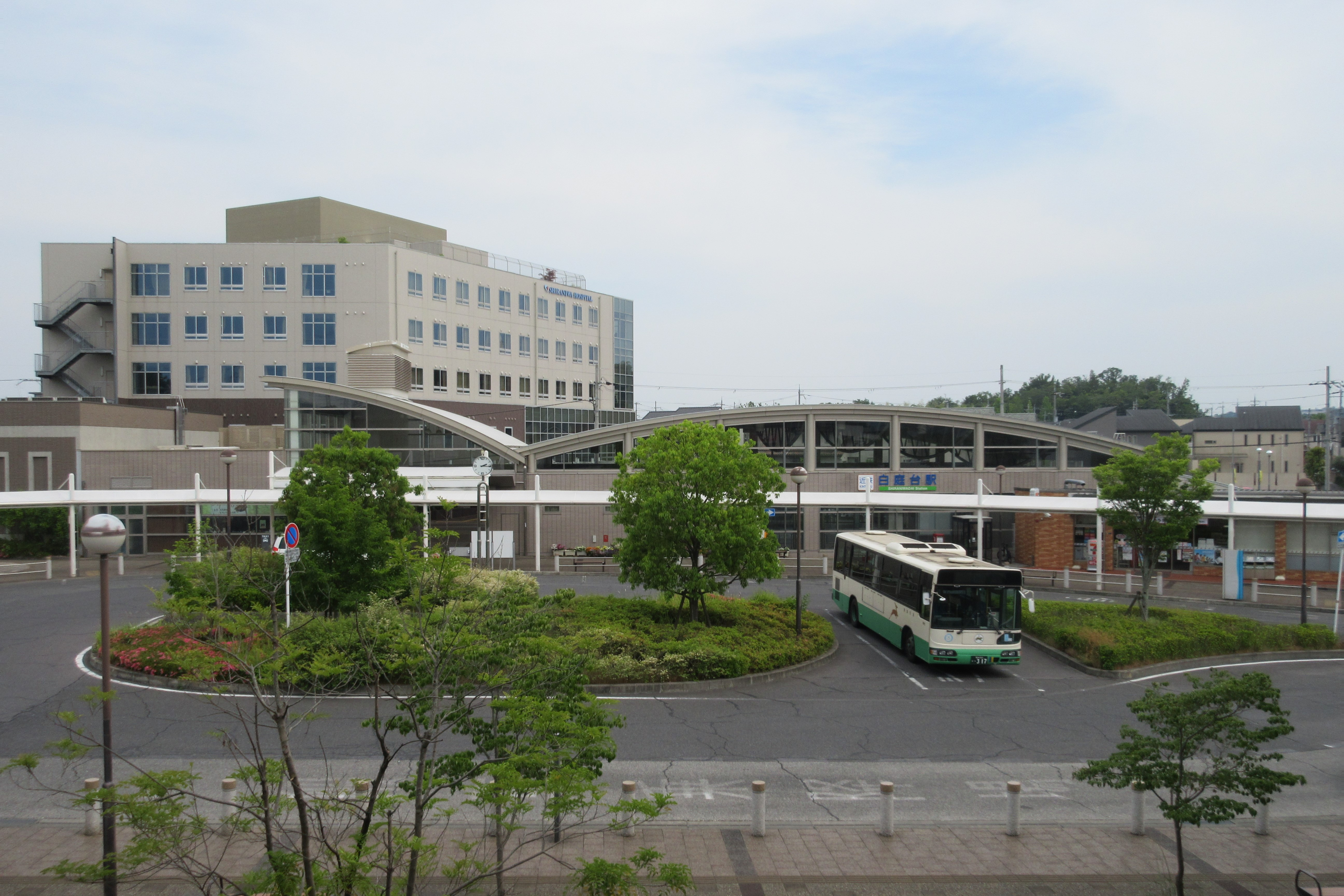
- Shiraniwadai Station

General information
- Location: 11-1, Shiraniwadai 6-chome, Ikoma-shi, Nara-ken （奈良県生駒市白庭台六丁目11-1） Japan
- Coordinates: 34°43′15.88″N 135°43′0.88″E
- Owner: Kintetsu Railway
- Operator: Kintetsu Railway
- Line: C Keihanna Line
- Distance: 15.3 km (9.5 miles) from Nagata
- Platforms: 2 side platforms
- Train operators: Kintetsu Railway
- Connections: Bus stop

Other information
- Station code: C28
- Website: www.kintetsu.co.jp/station/station_info/station04009.html

History
- Opened: 27 March 2006

Passengers
- 2019: 4,574 daily

Services
Preceding station	Kintetsu Railway	Following station
Ikoma C27 towards Yumeshima	Keihanna Line Local	Gakken Kita-Ikoma C29 towards Gakken Nara-Tomigaoka
Location

Shiraniwadai Station (白庭台駅, Shiraniwadai-eki) is a passenger railway station located in the city of Ikoma, Nara Prefecture, Japan. It is operated by the private transportation company, Kintetsu Railway. It serves the Planned community of Shiraniwadai.

== Line ==
Shiraniwadai Station is served by the Keihanna Line and is 15.3 kilometers from the starting point of the line at Nagata, and 36.4 kilometers from Yumeshima.

== Layout ==
The station has two semi-underground side platforms and two tracks connected by an elevated station building The ticket gates and concourse are on the first floor, and the platform is below. There is only one ticket gate. Because it is semi-underground, there are tunnels on both sides of the station. The station building is designed to harmonize with the surrounding hills, making extensive use of gentle curves. Not only the station building but also the station sign features a gently curved flower design as the station logo. The walls are made of glass, giving the station a sense of openness.

=== Platforms ===
1	■ C Keihanna Line	Gakken Nara-Tomigaoka
2	■ C Keihanna Line	for Ikoma, Nagata, Hommachi and Yumeshima

== History ==
- January 2005: Station name was finalized.
- March 27, 2006: Station begins services as the Keihanna Line extension between Ikoma and Gakken Nara-Tomigaoka opens.
- April 1, 2007: PiTaPa support enabled at this station.

== Passenger statistics ==
In fiscal 2019, the station was used by an average of 4574 passengers daily (boarding passengers only).

== Surrounding area ==
- Mount Shiraniwa
  - Tomb of Nigihayahi-no-mikoto

== See also ==
- List of railway stations in Japan
