= Shin-Ishikiri Station =

Railway station in Higashiōsaka, Osaka Prefecture, Japan

Shin-Ishikiri Station 新石切駅
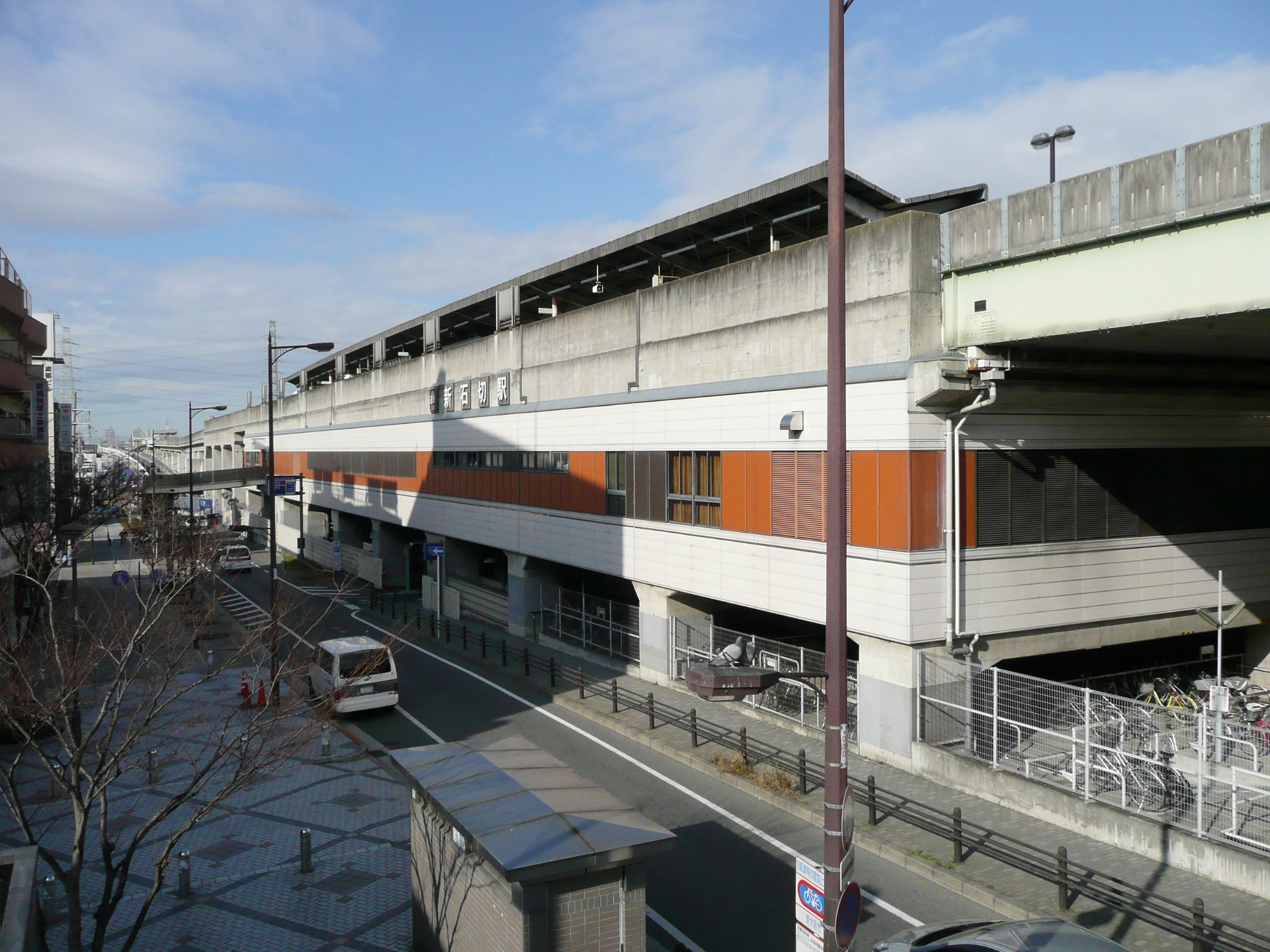
- Shin-Ishikiri Station

General information
- Location: 3, Nishiisikirimachi 3-chome, Higashiōsaka-shi, Osaka-fu 579-8013; Japan
- Coordinates: 34°40′48.67″N 135°38′27.19″E
- Operator: Kintetsu Railway
- Line: Keihanna Line
- Distance: 4.5 km (2.8 mi) from Nagata
- Platforms: 2 island platforms
- Tracks: 3

Construction
- Structure type: Elevated

Other information
- Station code: C26
- Website: Official website

History
- Opened: 1 October 1986; 39 years ago

Passengers
- FY2018: 18,240 daily

Services
Preceding station	Kintetsu Railway	Following station
Yoshita towards Yumeshima	Keihanna Line	Ikoma towards Gakken Nara-Tomigaoka
Location
- Location within Osaka Prefecture Location within Japan

Shin-Ishikiri Station (新石切駅, Shin-Ishikiri-eki) is a passenger railway station in located in the city of Higashiōsaka, Osaka Prefecture, Japan, operated by the private railway operator Kintetsu Railway.

== Lines ==
Shin-Ishikiri Station is served by the Keihanna Line, and is located 4.5 rail kilometers from the starting point of the line at Nagata Station and 22.4 kilometers from Cosmosquare Station.

== Station layout ==
The station consists of two elevated island platforms serving three tracks, with the station building located underneath.

=== Platforms ===
1	■ Keihanna Line	for Ikoma and Gakken Nara-Tomigaoka
2	■ Center track	No regular service
3	■ Keihanna Line	for Nagata, Hommachi and Yumeshima

== History ==
Shin-Ishikiri Station opened on October 1, 1986

== Passenger statistics ==
In fiscal 2018, the station was used by an average of 18,240 passengers daily.

== Surrounding area ==
- Hishikiri Tsurugiya Shrine
- Osaka Prefectural Higashi Osaka Support School
- Ishikiri Seiki Hospital

== See also ==
- List of railway stations in Japan
