= Aramoto Station =

Railway station in Higashiōsaka, Osaka Prefecture, Japan

Aramoto Station 荒本駅
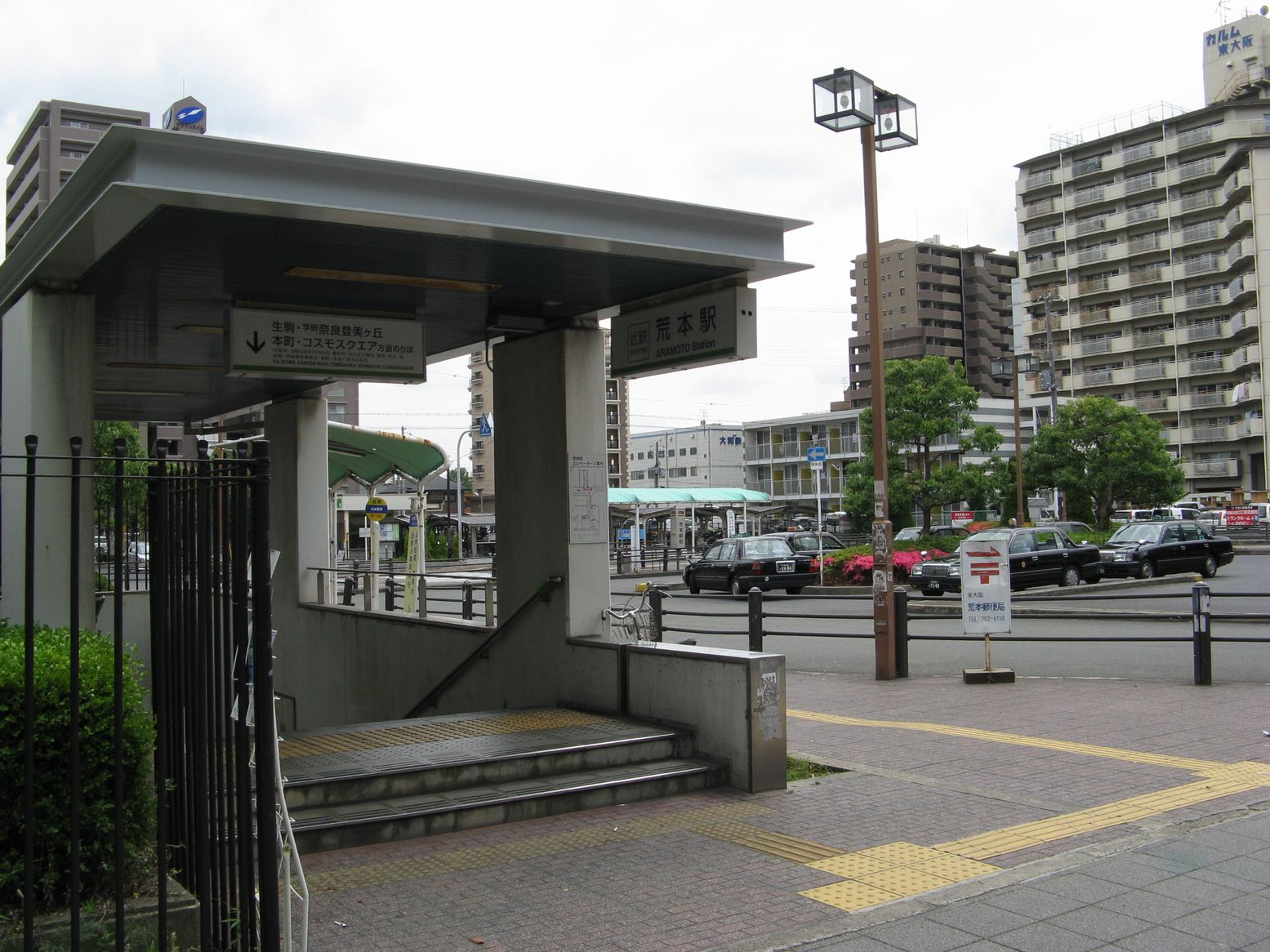
- Aramoto Station Ground Entrance and Station Rotary

General information
- Location: 2-8-10 Aramotokita, Higashiōsaka-shi, Osaka-fu （大阪府東大阪市荒本北二丁目8-10） Japan
- Coordinates: 34°40′43.06″N 135°36′17.69″E
- System: Kintetsu rapid transit station
- Operator: Kintetsu Railway
- Line: Keihanna Line
- Distance: 1.2 km (0.75 mi) from Nagata
- Platforms: 1 island platform

Construction
- Structure type: Underground

Other information
- Station code: C24
- Website: Official website

History
- Opened: 1 October 1986; 40 years ago

Passengers
- FY2018: 16,277 daily

Services
Preceding station	Kintetsu Railway	Following station
Nagata towards Yumeshima	Keihanna Line	Yoshita towards Gakken Nara-Tomigaoka
Location
- Location within Osaka Prefecture Location within Japan

Aramoto Station (荒本駅, Aramoto-eki) is a passenger railway station located in the city of Higashiōsaka, Osaka Prefecture, Japan, operated by the private railway operator Kintetsu Railway.

== Lines ==
Aramoto Station is served by the Keihanna Line, and is located 1.2 rail kilometers from the starting point of the line at Nagata Station and 19.1 kilometers from Cosmosquare Station.

== Station layout ==
The station consists of one underground island platform.

=== Platforms ===
1	■ Keihanna Line	for Ikoma and Gakken Nara-Tomigaoka
2	■ Keihanna Line	for Nagata, Hommachi and Yumeshima

== History ==
Aramoto Station opened on October 1, 1986

== Passenger statistics ==
In fiscal 2018, the station was used by an average of 16,277 passengers daily.

== Surrounding area ==
- Higashiōsaka City Hall
- Osaka Prefectural Central Library

== See also ==
- List of railway stations in Japan
