= Gakken Kita-Ikoma Station =

Railway station in Ikoma, Nara Prefecture, Japan

Gakken Kita-Ikoma Station 学研北生駒駅
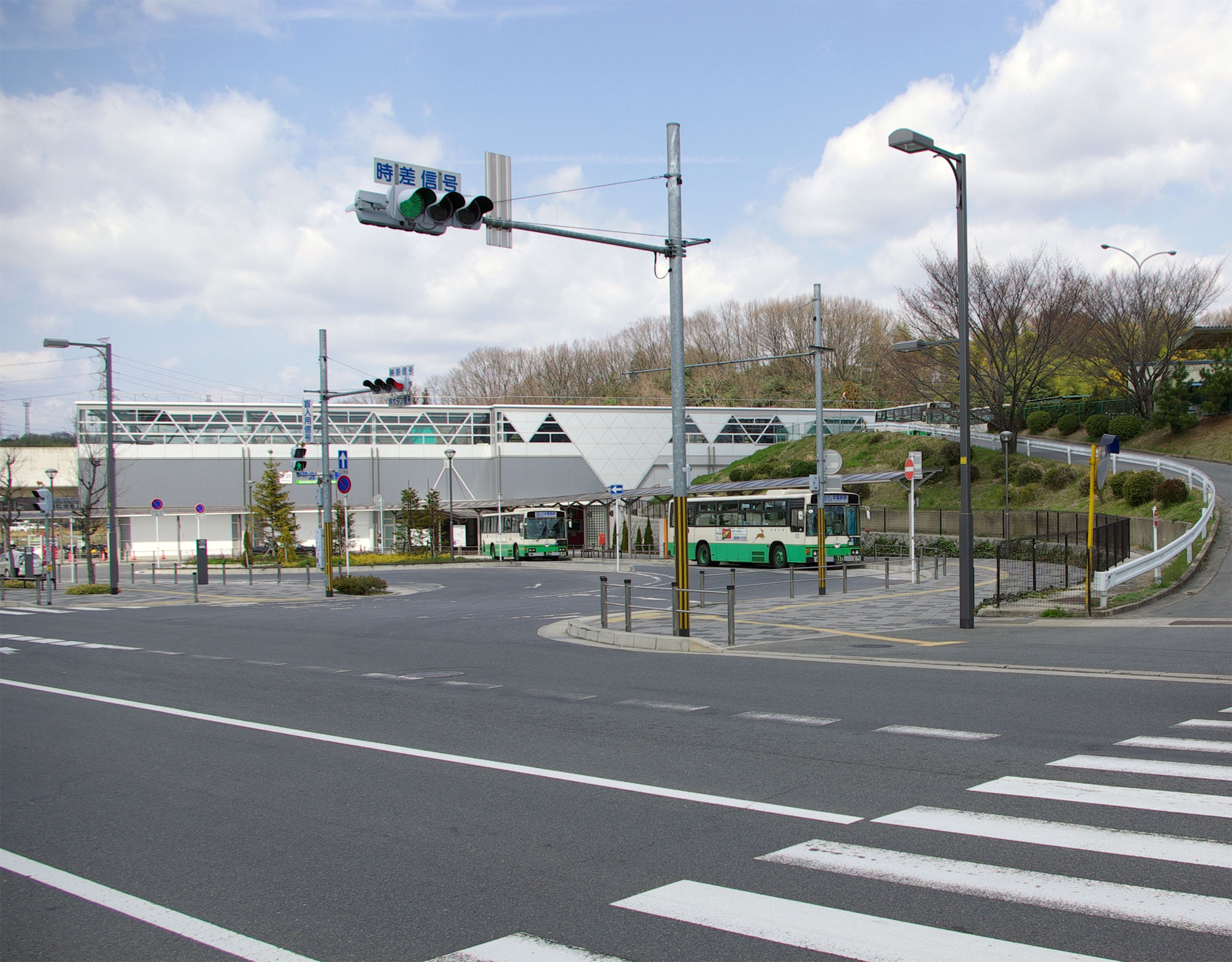
- Gakken Kita-Ikoma Station

General information
- Location: 3535-6, Kamimachi, Ikoma-shi, Nara-ken （奈良県生駒市上町3535-6） Japan
- Coordinates: 34°43′29.69″N 135°43′24.44″E
- Owner: Kintetsu Railway
- Operator: Kintetsu Railway
- Line: C Keihanna Line
- Distance: 16.1 km (10.0 miles) from Nagata
- Platforms: 2 side platforms
- Train operators: Kintetsu Railway
- Connections: Bus terminal

Other information
- Station code: C29
- Website: www.kintetsu.co.jp/station/station_info/station04010.html

History
- Opened: 27 March 2006

Passengers
- 2019: 3508 daily

Services
Preceding station	Kintetsu Railway	Following station
Shiraniwadai towards Yumeshima	Keihanna Line Local	Gakken Nara-Tomigaoka Terminus
Location

Gakken Kita-Ikoma Station (学研北生駒駅, Gakken Kita-Ikoma-eki) is a passenger railway station located in the city of Ikoma, Nara Prefecture, Japan. It is operated by the private transportation company, Kintetsu Railway.

== Line ==
Gakken Kita-Ikoma Station is served by the Keihanna Line and is 16.1 kilometers from the starting point of the line at Nagata, and 37.2 kilometers from Yumeshima.

== Layout ==
The station is an elevated station with two side platforms and two tracks. The effective length of the platform is four cars. The ticket gates and concourse are on the first floor, and the platform is on the second floor. The station building was designed to be highly visible and impressive, and the exterior walls are made of glass and aluminum, with a repeated triangular design that gives it a light and cutting-edge image. It also features a symbolic color scheme and cylindrical columns.The glass walls give the station building an open feel. In the concourse inside the ticket gates, there is an exhibition corner of Ikoma City's commercial and industrial products, such as Takayama tea whisks. As the station is located within Gakuen Toshi and is the closest station to the Nara Institute of Science and Technology, mosaic art depicting human evolution is displayed outside the ticket gates in the station building, and a promotional video for the university is screened next to the ticket gates.

=== Platforms ===
1	■ C Keihanna Line	Gakken Nara-Tomigaoka
2	■ C Keihanna Line	for Ikoma, Nagata, Hommachi and Yumeshima

== History ==
- March 27, 2006: Station begins services as the Keihanna Line extension between Ikoma and Gakken Nara-Tomigaoka opens.

== Passenger statistics ==
In fiscal 2019, the station was used by an average of 3508 passengers daily (boarding passengers only).

== Surrounding area ==
- Nara Kotsu Kita-Yamato Office
- Kansai Science City Takayama Region
  - Nara Institute of Science and Technology
- Osaka Prefectural Route 7 and Nara Prefectural Route 7 Hirakata-Yamatokoriyama Route

== See also ==
- List of railway stations in Japan
