= Ikoma, Nara =

Ikoma 生駒市
- City
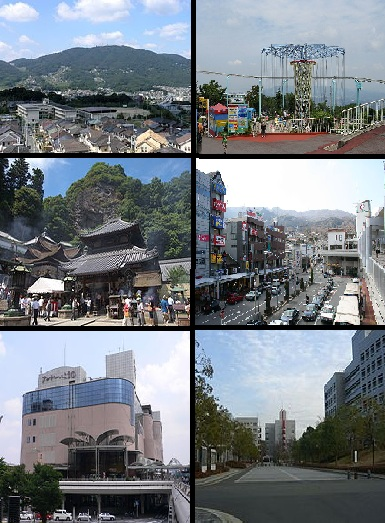
- Ikoma City

- Flag Emblem

- Location of Ikoma in Nara Prefecture

- Location in Japan
- Coordinates: 34°42′N 135°42′E
- Country: Japan
- Region: Kansai
- Prefecture: Nara Prefecture

Government
  - Mayor: Masashi Komurasaki

Area
  - Total: 53.18 km^{2} (20.53 sq mi)

Population (April 1, 2017)
  - Total: 120,741
  - Density: 2,270/km^{2} (5,880/sq mi)
- Time zone: UTC+09:00 (JST)
- City hall address: 8-38 Higashi-shinmachi, Ikoma-shi, Nara-ken; 630-0288
- Website: www.city.ikoma.lg.jp/en/
- Symbols
- Flower: Chrysanthemum
- Tree: Quercus gilva

Ikoma (生駒市, Ikoma-shi; Japanese pronunciation: [í.kò̞.mä̀, ì.kó̞.mä́.ɕì]) is a city at the northwestern end of Nara Prefecture in the Kansai region of Japan. It was founded on November 1, 1971. As of September 1, 2023, the city has an estimated population of 117,259, with 51,478 households. It has a population density of 2,300 persons per km^{2}, and it has the third largest population in the prefecture. The total area is 53.18 km^{2}. The city is known as one of the most affluent suburbs of the Greater Osaka Metropolitan Area (Keihanshin), with a high rate of college graduates, professionals, and company directors amongst its residents. As a result, the city has developed as a satellite city of Osaka, with some 54% of its residents commuting across prefectural borders to Osaka. Kansai Science City is partially located in Ikoma, which is also home to the Nara Institute of Science and Technology. The city is also famous for chasen.

== Notable locations ==
- Kuragari-toge Pass
- Kurondo-ike Pond
- Mount Ikoma
- Skyland Ikoma (amusement park on top of Mount Ikoma)

=== Religious institutions ===
- Chikurin-ji
- Chofuku-ji
- Chokyu-ji
- Enpuku-ji
- Ikoma Jinja
- Hozan-ji
- Sekibutsu-Ji

== History ==
The city area is described in the Nihon shoki, the second-oldest Chronicles of Japan, and had been a small village outside Heijo-kyo, one of the former capitals of Japan.

From Muromachi period, chasen production began in Takayama region, the northern part of the city. Chasen is a tool used to make Japanese tea in the tea ceremony.

In Edo Period, Hozan-ji temple was built on the mountainside of Mount Ikoma and the nearby area came to grow as a gateway town for the temple. Imperial House and Tokugawa shoguns visited there for worship.

After the difficult construction of Ikoma-tunnel, which penetrates Mount Ikoma, railway to Osaka and Nara service begun operating. Ikoma Cable Line from Toriimae Station, near the Ikoma Station, to Hozanji Station and Ikoma-sanjyō Station opened for business. Also the train bound for foot of Mount Shigi and Oji station from Ikoma station. Thereafter around Hozan-ji and the midtown, which nearby the station have expanded.

After municipal incorporation of two towns to Ikoma-town, the town was elevated to city status on 1 November 1971.

Takayama region, located in northern area, began to develop as one part of Kansai Science City, then Nara Institute of Science and Technology and many private research and development facilities are built.

Higashi Osaka line connecting to Osaka Metro Chūō Line has been extended to Ikoma Station, thereby providing two routes into Osaka City.

The northern area has been developing into residential district, as a high-end residential area, and In 2006 Higashi Osaka Line was extended to this area and renamed the Keihanna Line.

This city is faced with a declining birthrate and aging population, like most municipalities in Japan and with tendency to return to the big city center like Osaka city, yet it is developing as an environmentally advanced city, as superior residential city.

== Transportation ==
=== Rail ===
- Kintetsu Railway
  - Nara Line: Ikoma Station - Higashi-Ikoma Station
  - Ikoma Line: Ikoma Station - Nabata Station - Ichibu Station - Minami-Ikoma Station - Haginodai Station - Higashiyama Station
  - Keihanna Line: Ikoma Station - Shiraniwadai Station - Gakken Kita-Ikoma Station - Gakken Nara-Tomigaoka Station
  - Ikoma Cable Line: Toriimae Station (Ikoma Station) - Hōzanji Station - Umeyashiki Station - Kasumigaoka Station - Ikoma-Sanjō Station

=== Roads ===
- Expressways
  - Hanshin Expressway Dainihanna Route
- Japan National Route 163
- Japan National Route 168
- Japan National Route 308
- Shigi Ikoma Skyline

== Gallery ==
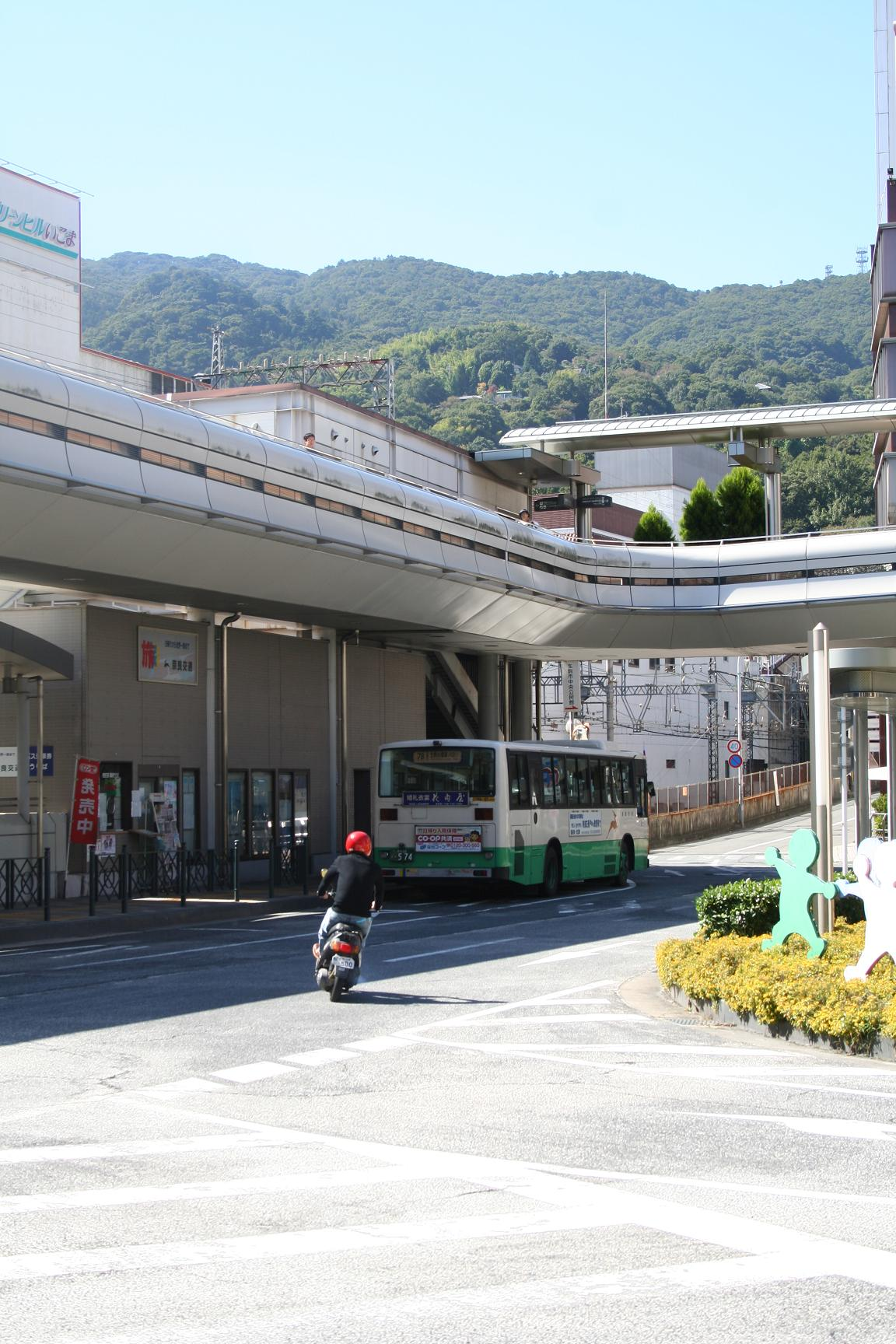
Kintetsu Ikoma Station

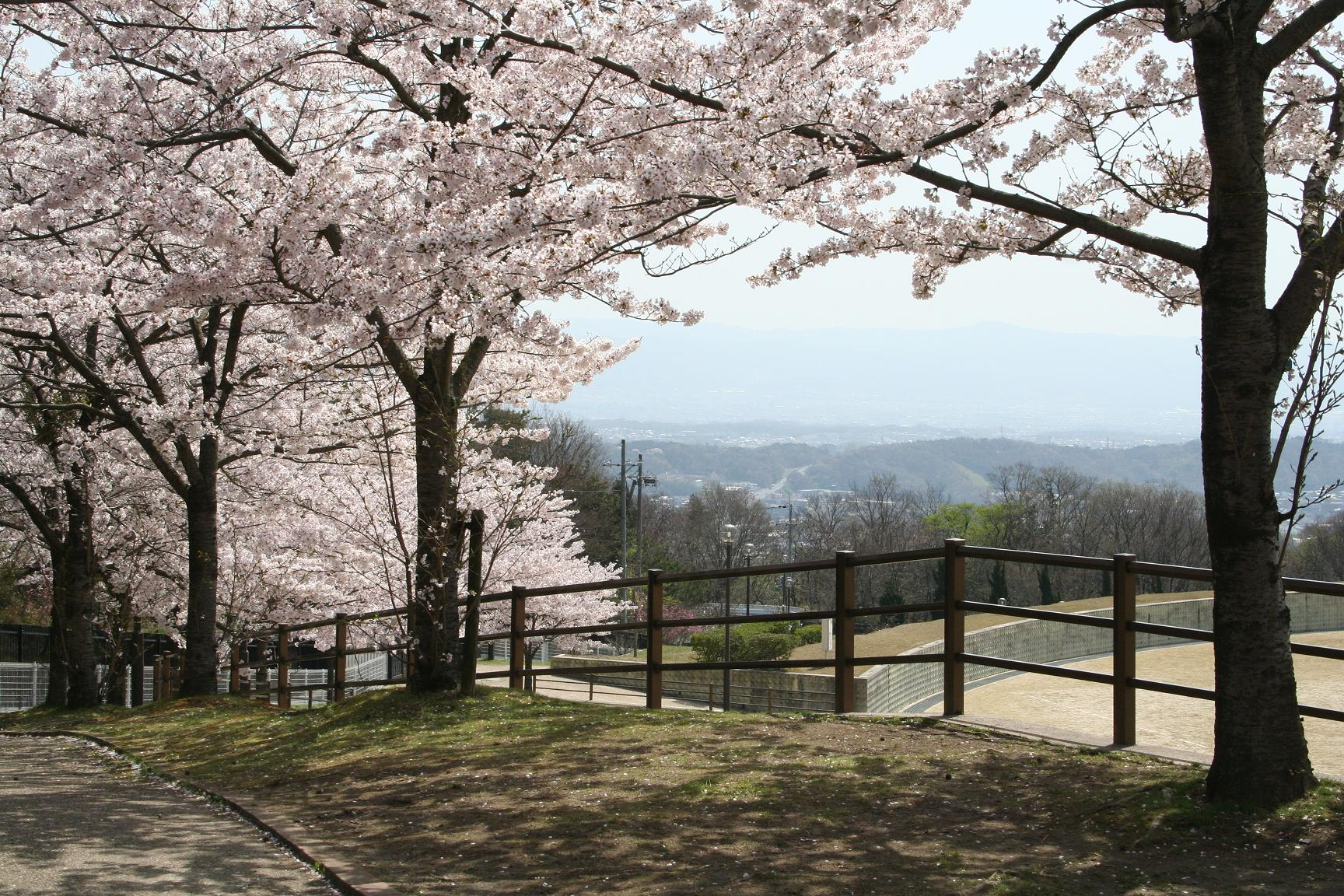
Cherry blossoms at Ikoma Fureai Center

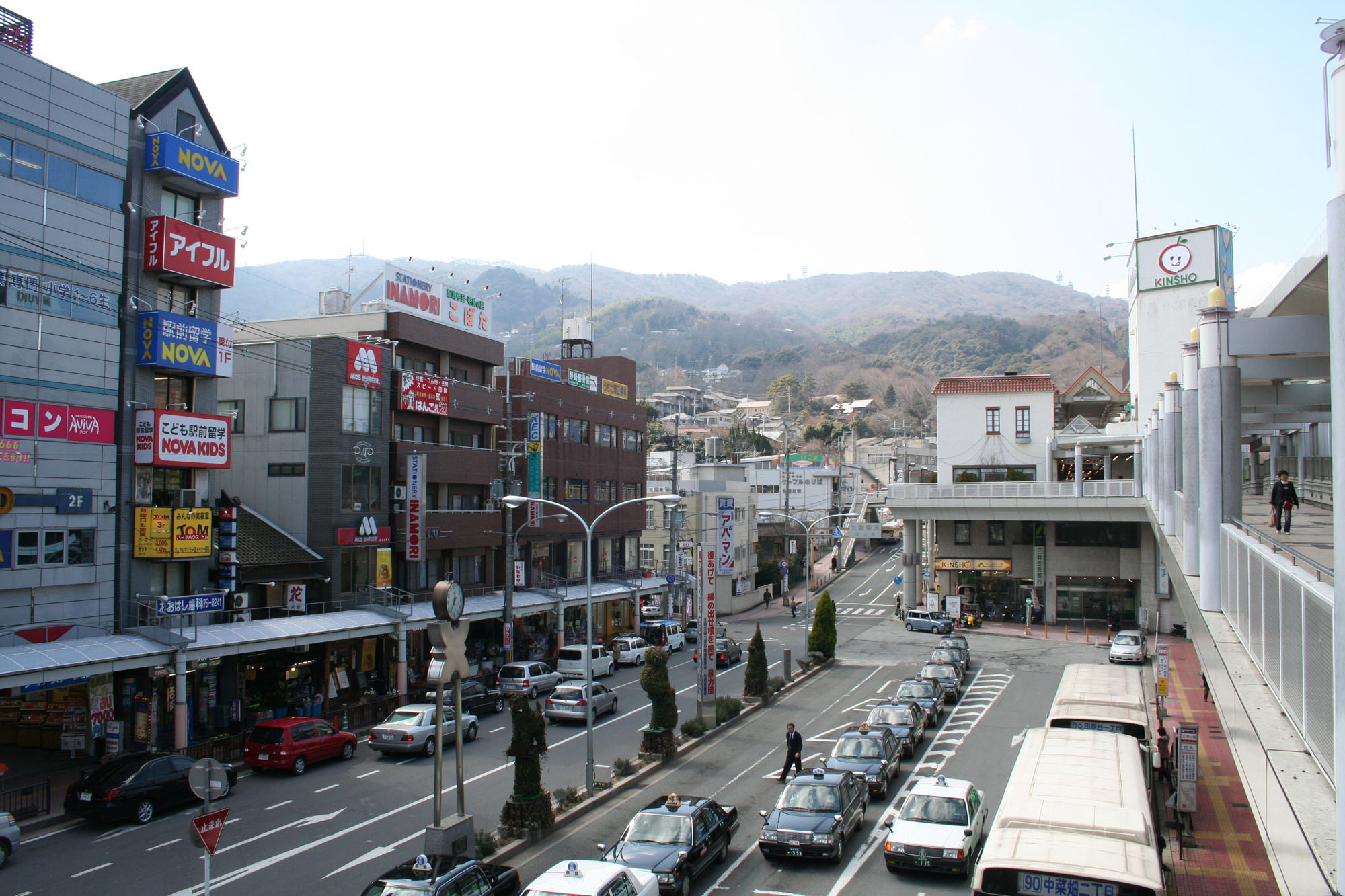
Exiting the train station in Ikoma

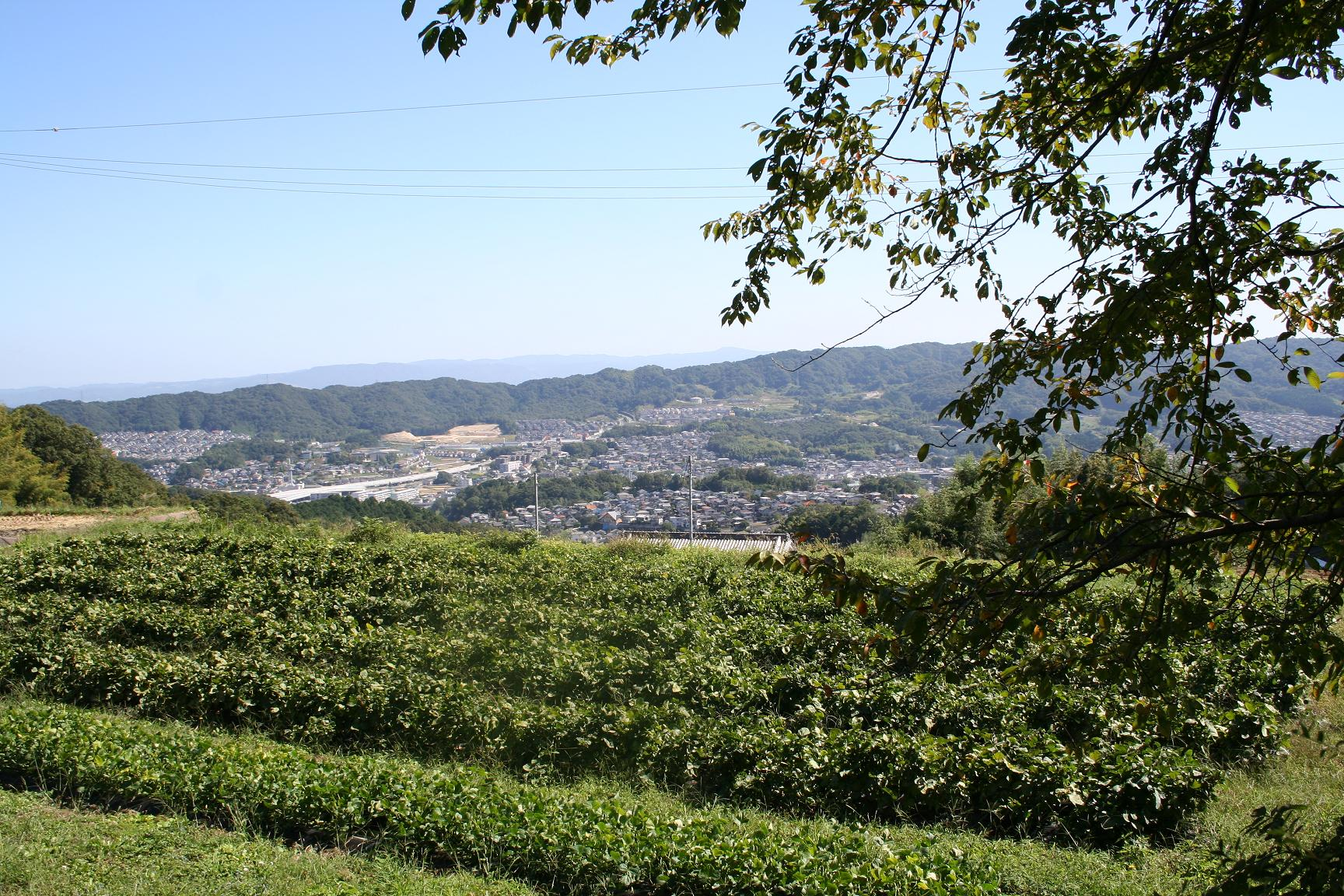
Mt. Ikoma eastward

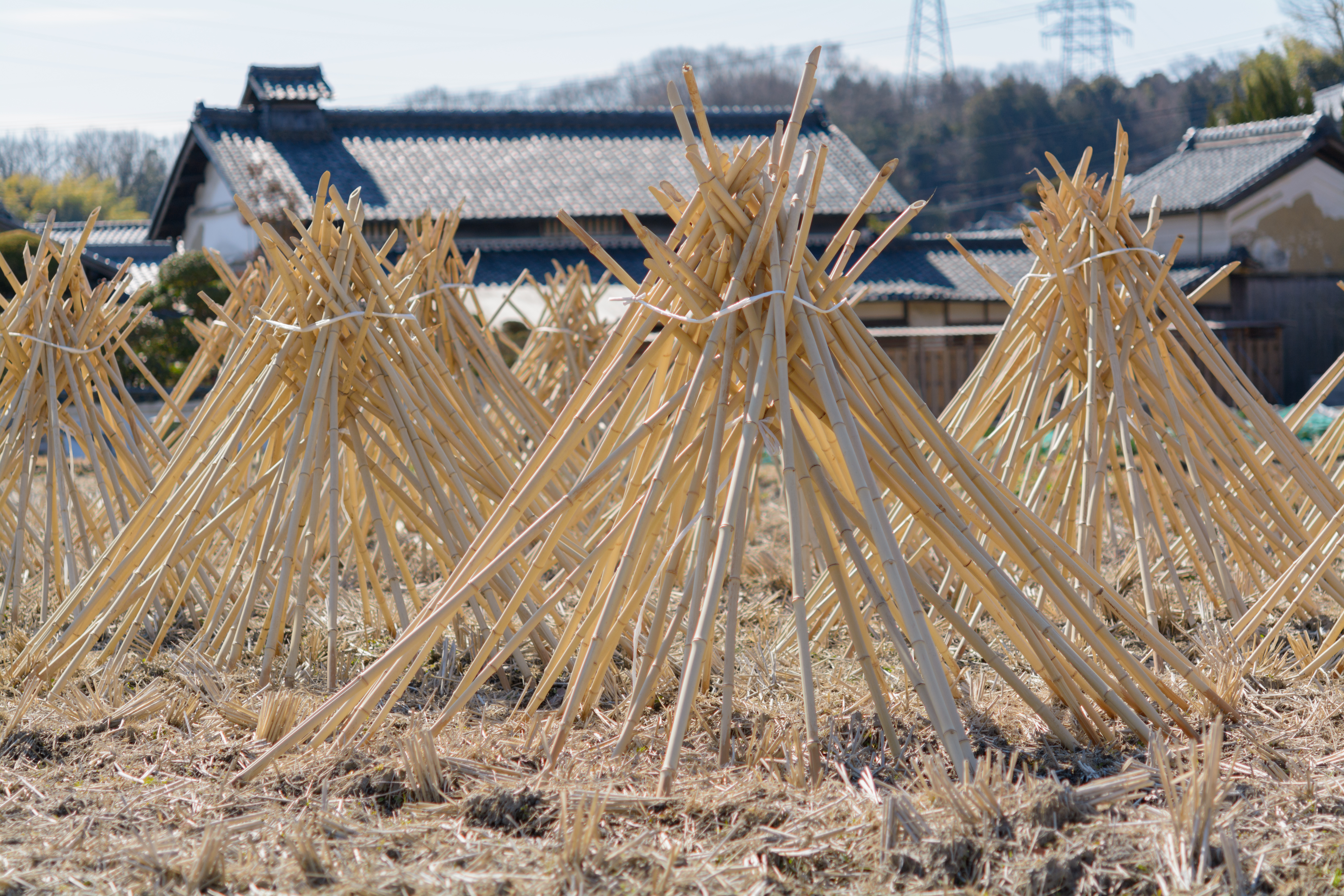
"Take no Kanboshi" is solar desiccation of bamboo for making "chasen" (tea whisks).

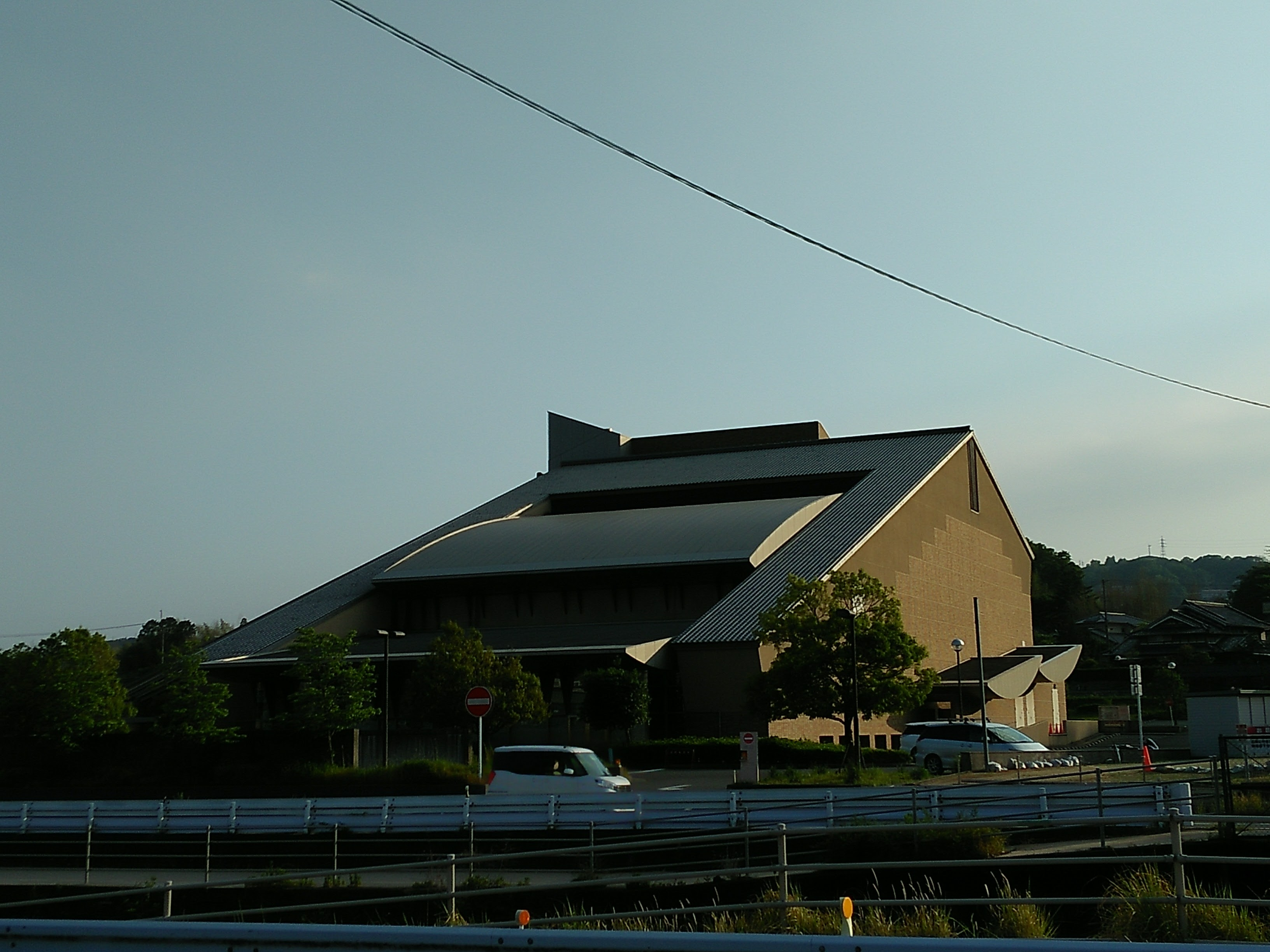
Habataki Ikoma building

== Notable people from Ikoma ==
- Naruki Doi, professional wrestler
- Kyogo Furuhashi, footballer
- Nao Matsushita, singer and actress
- Tomihiko Morimi, novelist
- Tetsu Miyagawa, baseball player
- Shiho Niiyama, voice actress
- Tsutomu Nishino, footballer
- Risa Nishioka, basketball player
- Kenji Satō, basketball player and coach
- Takumi Shimada, footballer
- Kana Ueda, voice actress
