= Gakken (disambiguation) =

Gakken can refer to:

- Gakken, Japanese publishing company
  - Gakken EX-System series of educational electronics kits produced by Gakken in the late 1970s
- Keihanna Gakken Toshi, as known as Kansai Science City in Japan
  - Gakken Nara-Tomigaoka Station, train station on the Kintetsu Keihanna Line in Nara, Nara Prefecture, Japan
  - Gakken Kita-Ikoma Station, train station on the Kintetsu Keihanna Line in Ikoma, Nara Prefecture, Japan.
- Keizo Dohi (1866 – 1931), pseudonym Gakken, Japanese dermatologist and urologist
