= Keihanna Line =

Railway line in Osaka Japan

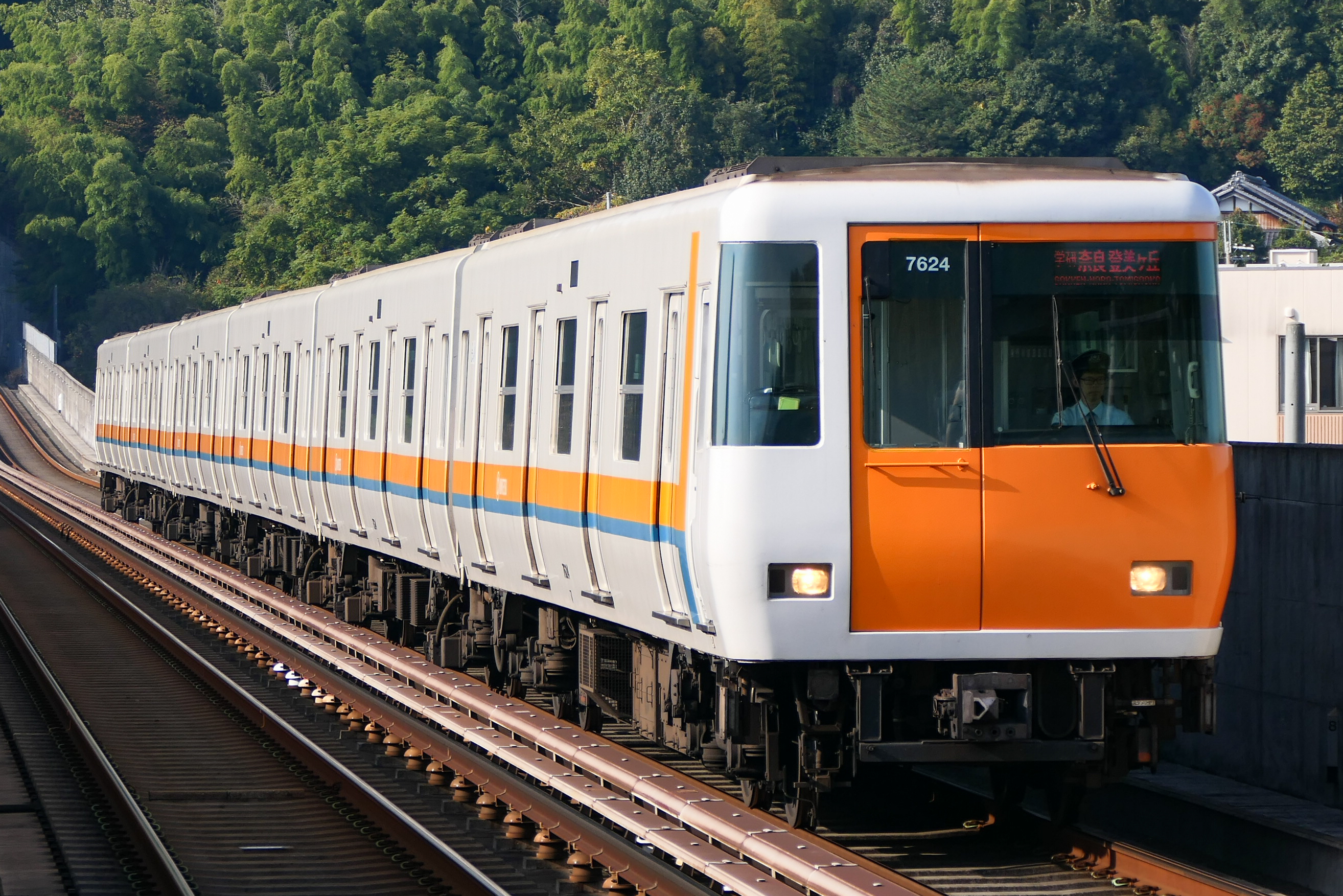
- Kintetsu 7020 series trainset on the Keihanna Line

Overview
- Other name: Yumehanna
- Native name: けいはんな線
- Owner: Kintetsu Railway; Nara Ikoma Rapid Railway
- Line number: C
- Locale: Osaka Prefecture (Higashiōsaka); Nara Prefecture (Ikoma and Nara City)
- Termini: Nagata; Gakken Nara-Tomigaoka
- Stations: 8
- Color on map: (#65c03a)

Service
- Type: Rapid transit; Commuter rail
- System: Kintetsu Railway; Osaka Metro
- Operator(s): Kintetsu Railway
- Depot(s): Higashi-Hanazono; Tomigaoka
- Rolling stock: 7000 series EMUs; 7020 series EMUs; Osaka Municipal Subway 20 series EMUs; Osaka Municipal Subway 24 series EMUs
- Daily ridership: 61,538 daily (FY2016)

History
- Opened: 1 October 1986; 39 years ago
- Last extension: 27 March 2006; 19 years ago

Technical
- Line length: 18.8 km (11.7 mi)
- Number of tracks: Double-track
- Track gauge: 1,435 mm (4 ft 8 1/2 in) standard gauge
- Electrification: 750 V DC (Third rail)
- Operating speed: 95 km/h (59 mph)
- Signalling: Automatic closed block
- Train protection system: WS-ATC

The Keihanna Line (けいはんな線, Keihanna-sen) is a railway line operated by Kintetsu Railway. There are through trains to the Chūō Line of Osaka Municipal Subway. The line name derives from a kanji acronym formed from Kyoto (京都), Osaka (大阪), and Nara (奈良), but the name is written in hiragana.

The line is the sole Kintetsu line with a third rail electrification system. Before 2015, it was the only Kintetsu line that had station numbers (the station numbers coming from the Chūō Line).

== History ==
- 16 September 1977 - Higashi-Osaka Ikoma Railway Co. (東大阪生駒鉄道, Higashiōsaka-Ikoma Tetsudō) was founded.
- 1 April 1986 - Kintetsu merged with Higashi-Osaka Ikoma Railway Co.
- 1 October 1986 - The Higashi-Osaka Line (東大阪線, Higashiōsaka-sen) from Nagata to Ikoma was opened and through operation to Osakako on the Chūō Line was started.
- 18 December 1997 - The through operation was extended to Cosmosquare.
- 28 July 1998 - Nara Ikoma Rapid Transit Railway Co., Ltd. (奈良生駒高速鉄道株式会社, Nara-Ikoma Kōsoku Tetsudō Kabushiki-gaisha) was founded.
- October 2000 - The construction of the Keihanna New Line (京阪奈新線, Keihanna Shinsen) started.
- 31 January 2005 - The Keihanna New Line extension was officially named the "Keihanna Line (けいはんな線, Keihanna-sen)".
- 27 March 2006 - The line from Ikoma to Gakken Nara-Tomigaoka was opened and the Higashi-Osaka Line was renamed the Keihanna Line.

== Stations ==
↑ Through-service to/from Yumeshima via the Osaka Metro Chūō Line ↑
No.	Station	Distance (km)	Connections	Location	
C 23	Nagata 長田	0.0	Osaka Metro: Chūō Line	Higashiosaka, Osaka	
C24	Aramoto 荒本	1.2	Osaka Monorail Main Line (proposed extension)	Higashiosaka, Osaka	
C25	Yoshita 吉田	3.0		Higashiosaka, Osaka	
C26	Shin-Ishikiri 新石切	4.5		Higashiosaka, Osaka	
C27	Ikoma 生駒	10.2	A Kintetsu-Nara Line; G Ikoma Line; Y Ikoma Cable Line (Toriimae)	Ikoma	Nara Prefecture
C28	Shiraniwadai 白庭台	15.3		Ikoma	Nara Prefecture
C29	Gakken Kita-Ikoma 学研北生駒	16.1		Ikoma	Nara Prefecture
C30	Gakken Nara-Tomigaoka 学研奈良登美ヶ丘	18.8		Nara	Nara Prefecture
