= Chūō Line (Osaka) =

Metro line in Osaka prefecture, Japan

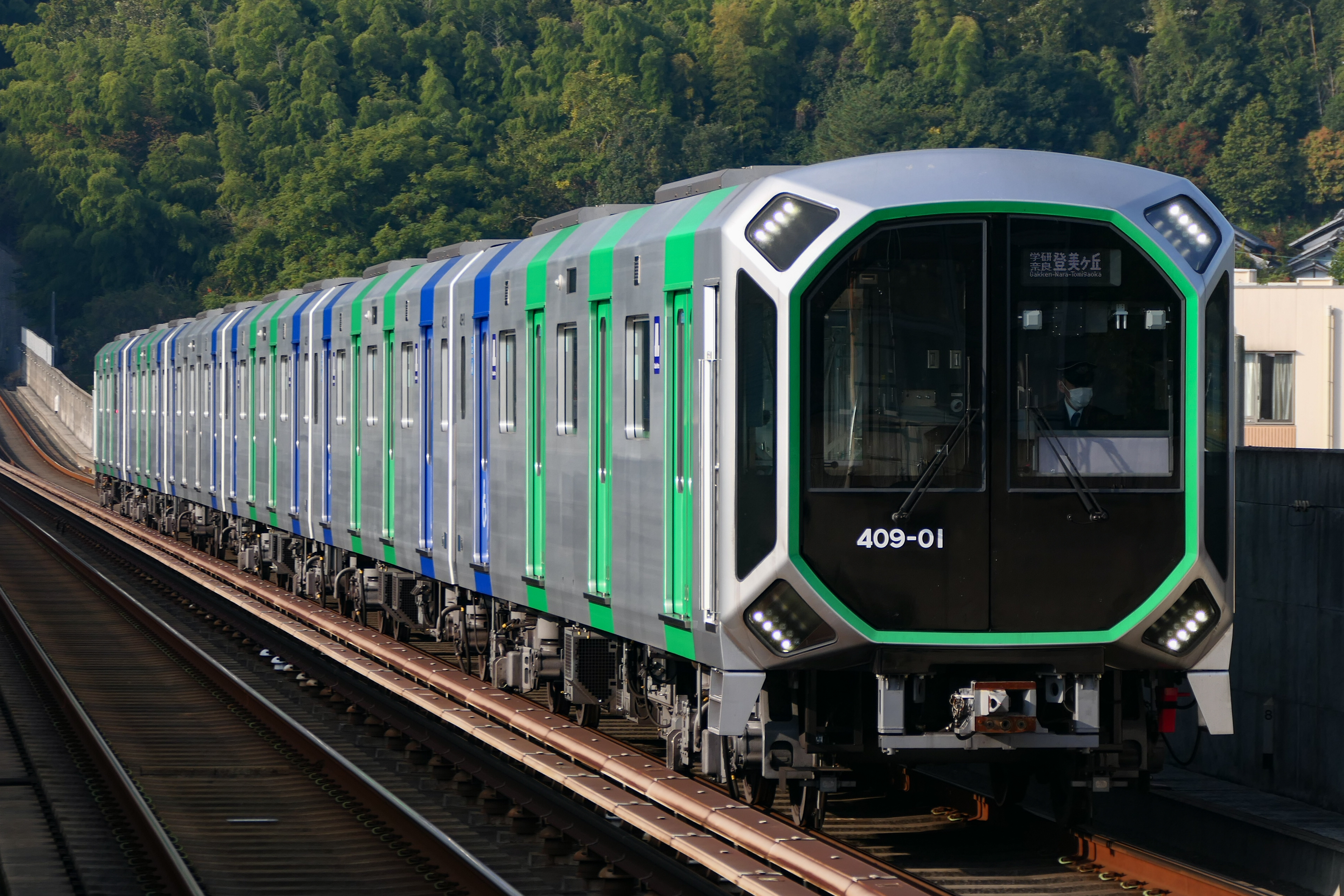
- A Chūō Line 400 series EMU

Overview
- Other name: Yumeshima
- Owner: Osaka Municipal Transportation Bureau (Ōsakakō — Nagata); Osaka Port Transport System Co., Ltd. (Yumeshima — Ōsakakō)
- Line number: 4
- Locale: Osaka and Higashiosaka
- Termini: Yumeshima; Nagata
- Stations: 15
- Color on map: Spectrum Green (#019A66)

Service
- Type: Rapid transit
- System: Osaka Metro
- Operator(s): Osaka Metro Co., Ltd. (2018–present); Osaka Municipal Transportation Bureau (1961–2018)
- Depot: Morinomiya

History
- Opened: 11 December 1961; 64 years ago
- Last extension: 19 January 2025; 19 months ago

Technical
- Line length: 21.1 km (13.1 mi)
- Track length: 21.1 km (13.1 mi)
- Track gauge: 1,435 mm (4 ft 8 1/2 in) standard gauge
- Electrification: 750 V DC third rail
- Operating speed: 95 km/h (59 mph)
- Signalling: Automatic closed block
- Train protection system: WS-ATC
Route map

The Chūō Line (中央線, Chūō-sen) is a rapid transit system in Osaka, Japan, operated by Osaka Metro. The line runs east-westerly under Chūō Avenue (中央大通, Chūō Ōdōri). Its official name is Rapid Electric Tramway Line No. 4 (高速電気軌道第4号線), and in MLIT publications, it is written as Line No. 4 (Chūō Line) (4号線（中央線）). Station numbers are indicated by the letter C.

Together with the through operation to the Keihanna Line, the two lines have a unified nickname "Yumehanna" (ゆめはんな).

On 1 July 2005, Osaka City bought the Technoport Line (テクノポート線) from Cosmosquare to Osakakō of its subsidiary Osaka Port Transport System Co., Ltd. (大阪港トランスポートシステム), reducing fares to increase traffic. The section operationally became a part of the Chūō Line, but is however still owned by OTS.

The Chūō Line is the only line to connect to all other subway lines operated by the Osaka Metro, including the Nankō Port Town Line.

== History ==
The line (initially known as Line No. 4) opened on 11 December 1961, initially running between Ōsakakō and Bentenchō (this was the first elevated portion of the Osaka subway system); trains were initially composed of single-car trainsets, with occasional use of three-car trainsets during trade fairs held near Asashiobashi. Between 1964 and 1985, the line was expanded towards Nagata in four stages:

- 31 October 1964: Section between Bentenchō and Hommachi opens, with intermediate stations at Kujo and Awaza.
- 30 September 1967: The section between Tanimachi 4-chome and Morinomiya opens as a shuttle service with 2-car trains.
- 29 July 1968: The section of the shuttle service between Morinomiya and Fukaebashi opens.
- 6 December 1969: The section between Hommachi and Tanimachi 4-chome (including Sakaisuji-Hommachi) opens after construction delays; the shuttle service between Tanimachi 4-chome and Fukaebashi was absorbed into the line, which was now named the Chūō Line. 4-car trains begin operation.
- 5 April 1985: The section between Fukaebashi and Nagata opens. 6-car trains begin operation.
- 1 October 1986: Through service to Ikoma commences upon the opening of the Kintetsu Keihanna Line (then named the Higashiosaka Line).

On 18 December 1997, the OTS Technoport Line opened between Ōsakakō and Cosmosquare. This line was absorbed into the Chūō Line on 1 July 2005. The Keihanna Line was extended further into Nara when the extension to Gakken Nara-Tomigaoka opened on 27 March 2006. On 19 January 2025, the first phase of the OTS Hokkō Technoport Line opened to Yumeshima Station in preparation for Expo 2025 to be held on the artificial island of Yumeshima.

=== Future plans ===
The OTS Hokkō Technoport Line is a planned extension of the Chūō Line from Cosmosquare on Sakishima to Yumeshima, Maishima Sports Island and Sakurajima. Phase 1, consisting of a one-stop extension to Yumeshima Station, opened on 19 January 2025, ahead of the opening of the Osaka 2025 Expo.

Separately, a new station is planned to be built on the spur track to the Morinomiya depot facility as part of local revitalization efforts and also to serve the new Morinomiya campus of Osaka Metropolitan University, with a projected completion date of 2028.

== Line data ==
- Above-ground section: west of Ōsakakō to west of Awaza; east of Aramoto (Keihanna Line)
- Block signalling: Automatic
- Train protection system: WS-ATC
- Cars per train: 6 (1984 – present)
- Maximum possible cars per train (platform length): 8

== Stations ==
No.	Station	Japanese	Distance (km)	Transfers	Location
C 09	Yumeshima	夢洲	0.0		Konohana-ku, Osaka
C 10	Cosmosquare	コスモスクエア	3.2	Nankō Port Town Line (P09)	Suminoe-ku, Osaka
C 11	Ōsakakō (Tempozan)	大阪港 （天保山）	5.6		Minato-ku, Osaka
C 12	Asashiobashi	朝潮橋	7.1		Minato-ku, Osaka
C 13	Bentenchō	弁天町	8.7	O Osaka Loop Line	Minato-ku, Osaka
C 14	Kujō	九条	10.0	Hanshin Namba Line	Nishi-ku, Osaka
C 15	Awaza	阿波座	11.5	Sennichimae Line (S13)	Nishi-ku, Osaka
C 16	Hommachi (Semba-nishi)	本町 （船場西）	12.6	Midōsuji Line (M18); Yotsubashi Line (Y13)	Chūō-ku, Osaka
C 17	Sakaisuji-Hommachi (Semba-higashi)	堺筋本町 （船場東）	13.3	Sakaisuji Line (K15)	Chūō-ku, Osaka
C 18	Tanimachi Yonchōme	谷町四丁目	14.3	Tanimachi Line (T23)	Chūō-ku, Osaka
C 19	Morinomiya	森ノ宮	15.6	Nagahori Tsurumi-ryokuchi Line (N20); O Osaka Loop Line	Chūō-ku, Osaka
C 20	Midoribashi	緑橋	16.8	Imazatosuji Line (I20)	Higashinari-ku, Osaka
C 21	Fukaebashi	深江橋	17.9		Higashinari-ku, Osaka
C 22	Takaida	高井田	19.3	F Osaka Higashi Line	Higashiosaka
C 23	Nagata	長田	21.1	C Keihanna Line	Higashiosaka
↓ Through services to/from Gakken Nara-Tomigaoka Station via the C Keihanna Line ↓

== Rolling stock ==
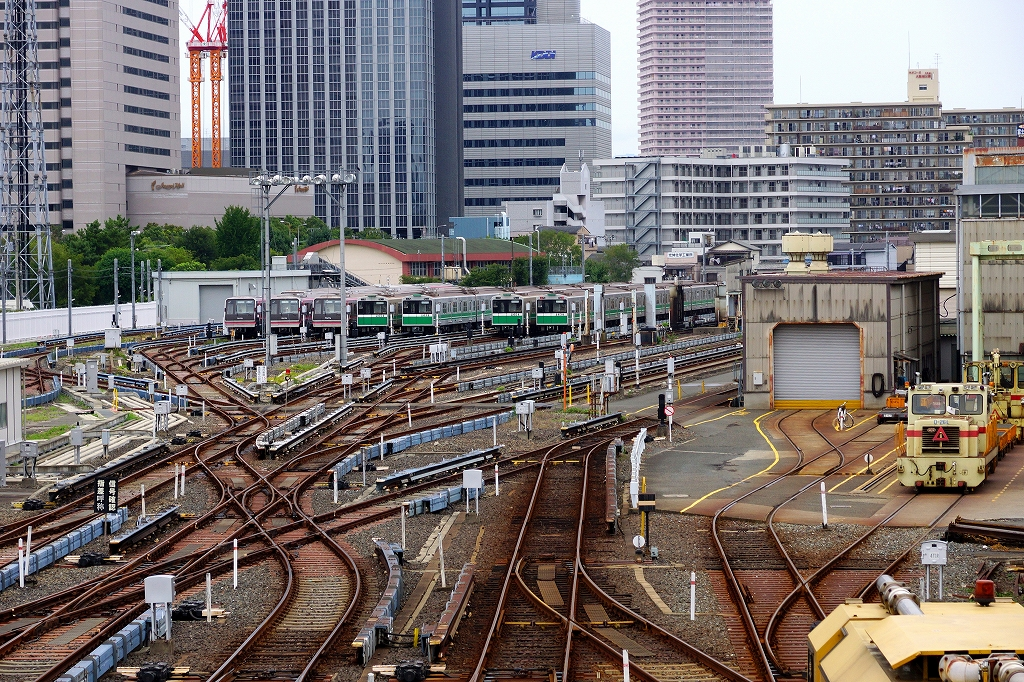
Morinomiya Depot in May 2015.

=== Osaka Metro ===
- 400 series (from 25 June 2023)

=== Kintetsu Railway ===
- 7000 series (from 1986)
- 7020 series (from 2004)

All rolling stock have a maximum service speed limit of 95 km/h (59 mph), which is achievable on the Yumeshima–Ōsakakō section as well as on the Keihanna Line, while the Ōsakakō–Nagata section has the standard subway speed limit of 70 km/h (43 mph). In addition, all rolling stock are equipped with retarders to negotiate the continuous gradients of the Ikoma Tunnel of the Keihanna Line.

The Osaka Metro rolling stock are stored at Morinomiya Depot, while the Kintetsu Railway rolling stock are based at Higashi-Hanazono and Tomigaoka Depots located on the Keihanna Line. Since 2016, after heavier repairs and maintenance of all third-rail-powered Osaka Metro rolling stock have been consolidated at Midorigi Depot on the Yotsubashi Line, Chūō Line rolling stock owned by Osaka Metro are also able to access said depot via a newly-built spur track located before Hommachi Station.

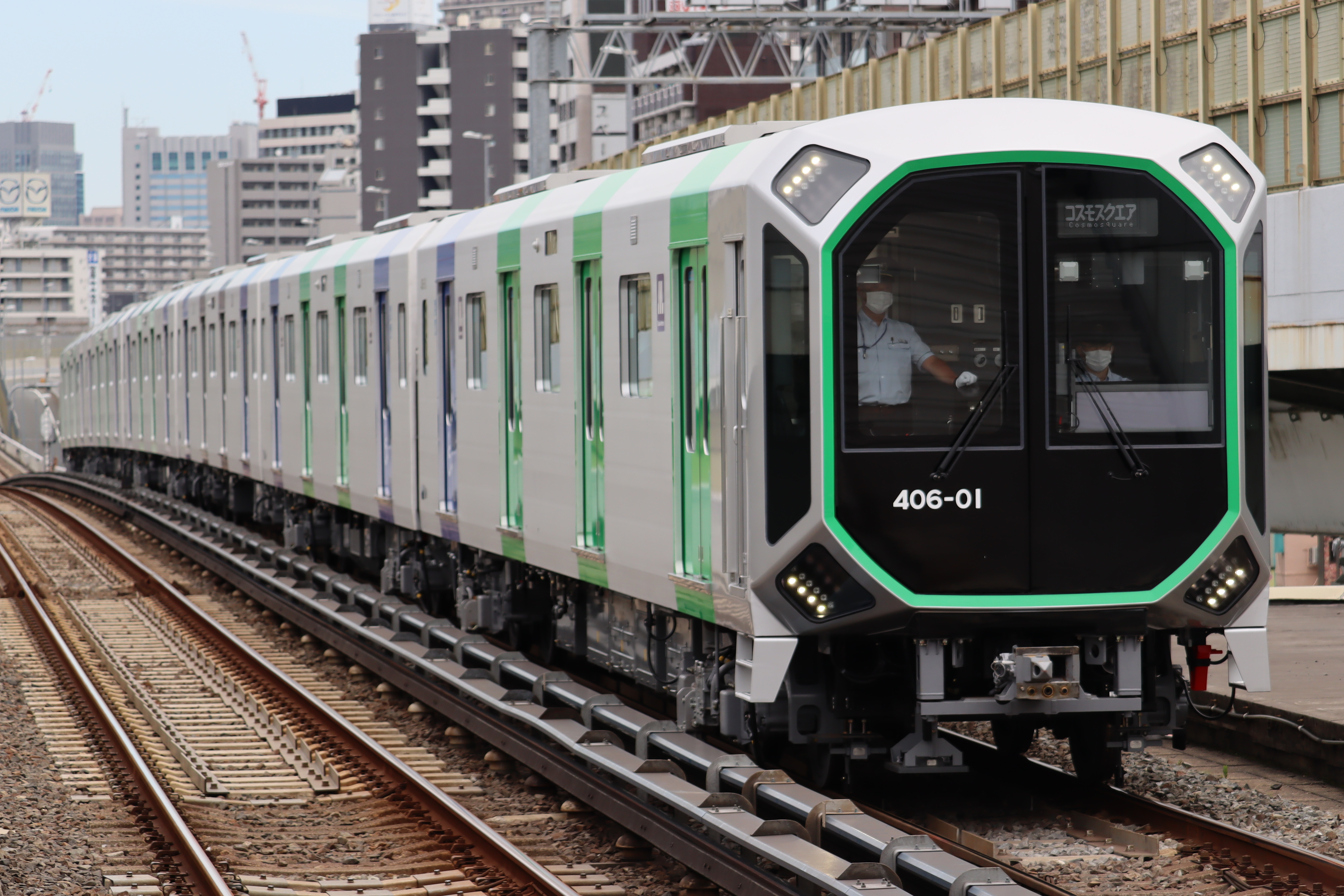
400 series

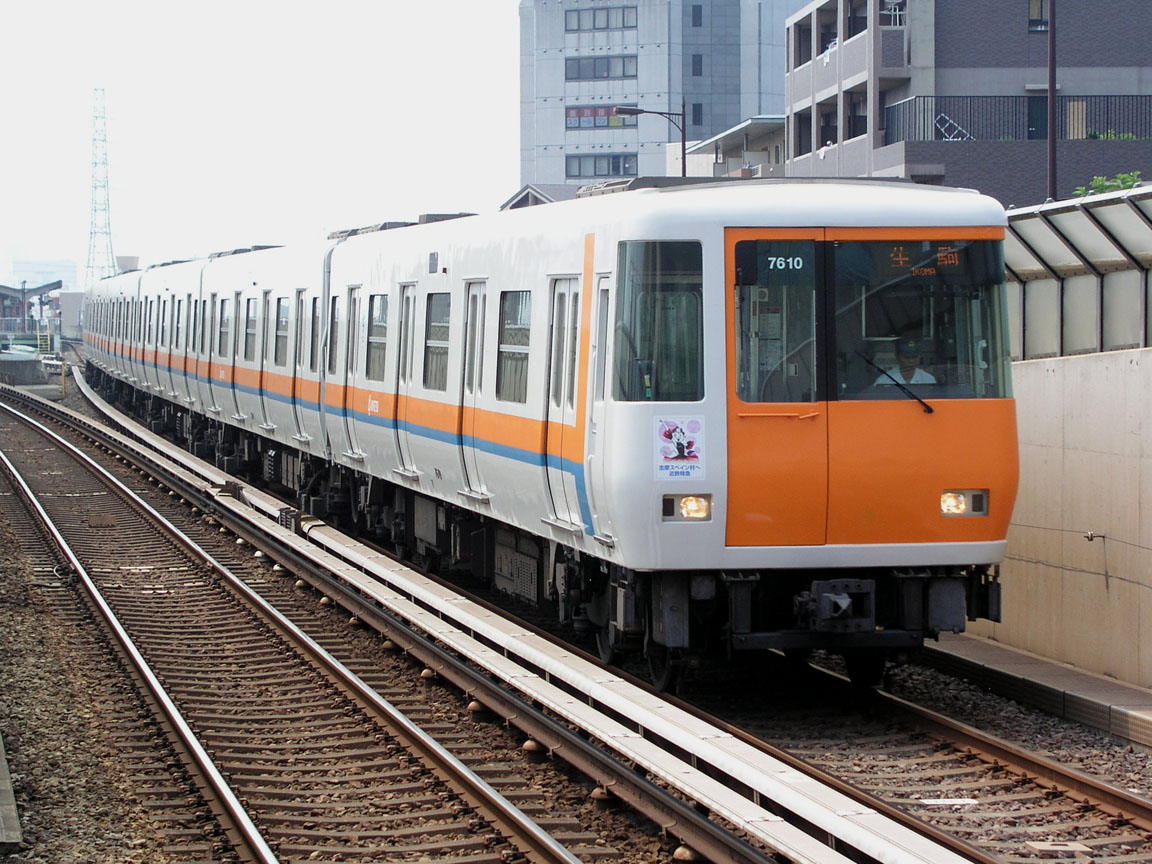
Kintetsu 7000/7020 series

=== Former ===
- 800 series (1961–1978)
- 900 series (1964–1978)
- 30 series (1967–1969, 1983–1995)
- 50 series (1969–1991)
- 20 series (1984–2024)
- 24 series (1991-2023)
- 30000A series (2022–2025)
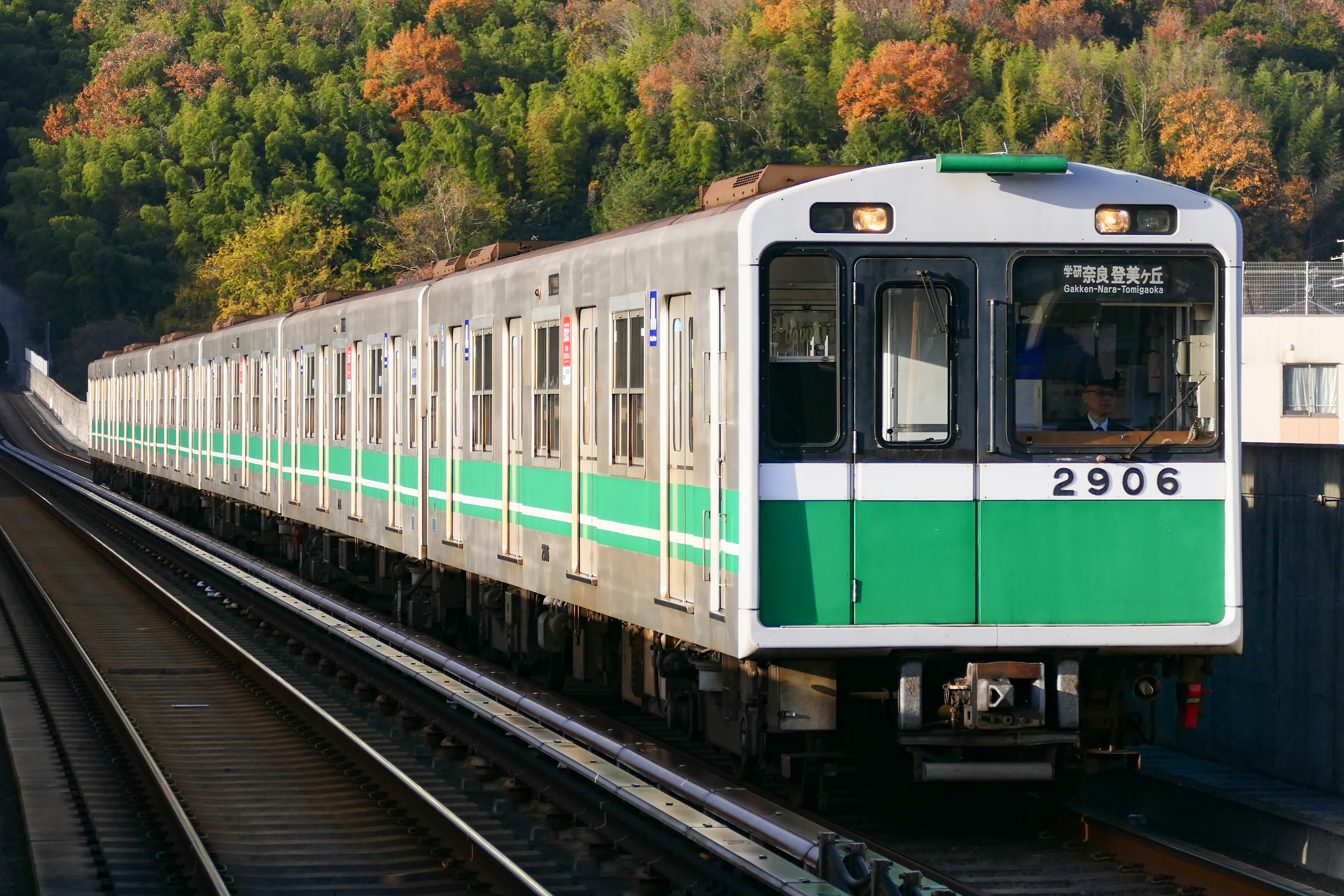
20 series

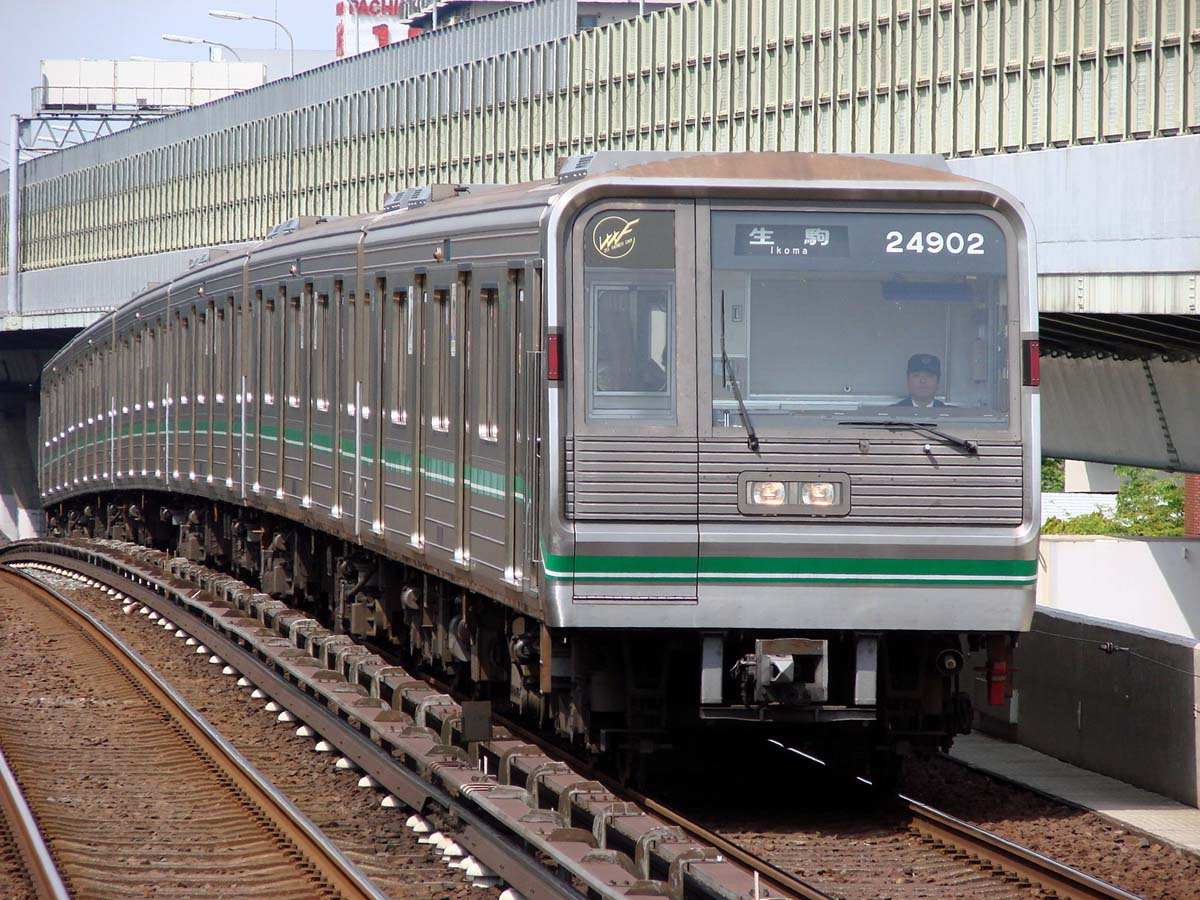
24 series

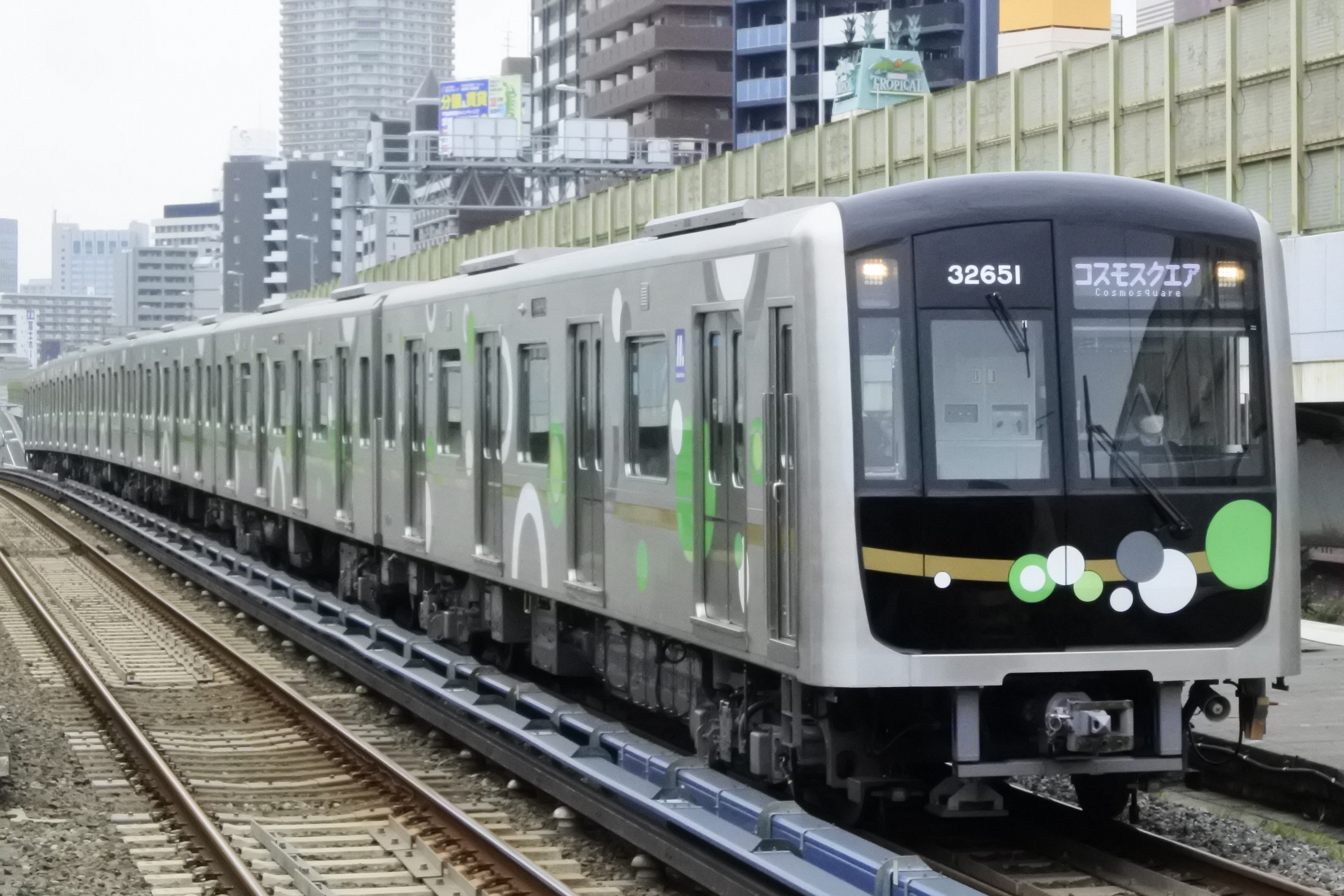
30000A series
