= Enpuku-ji (Nara) =

Enpuku-ji 円福寺
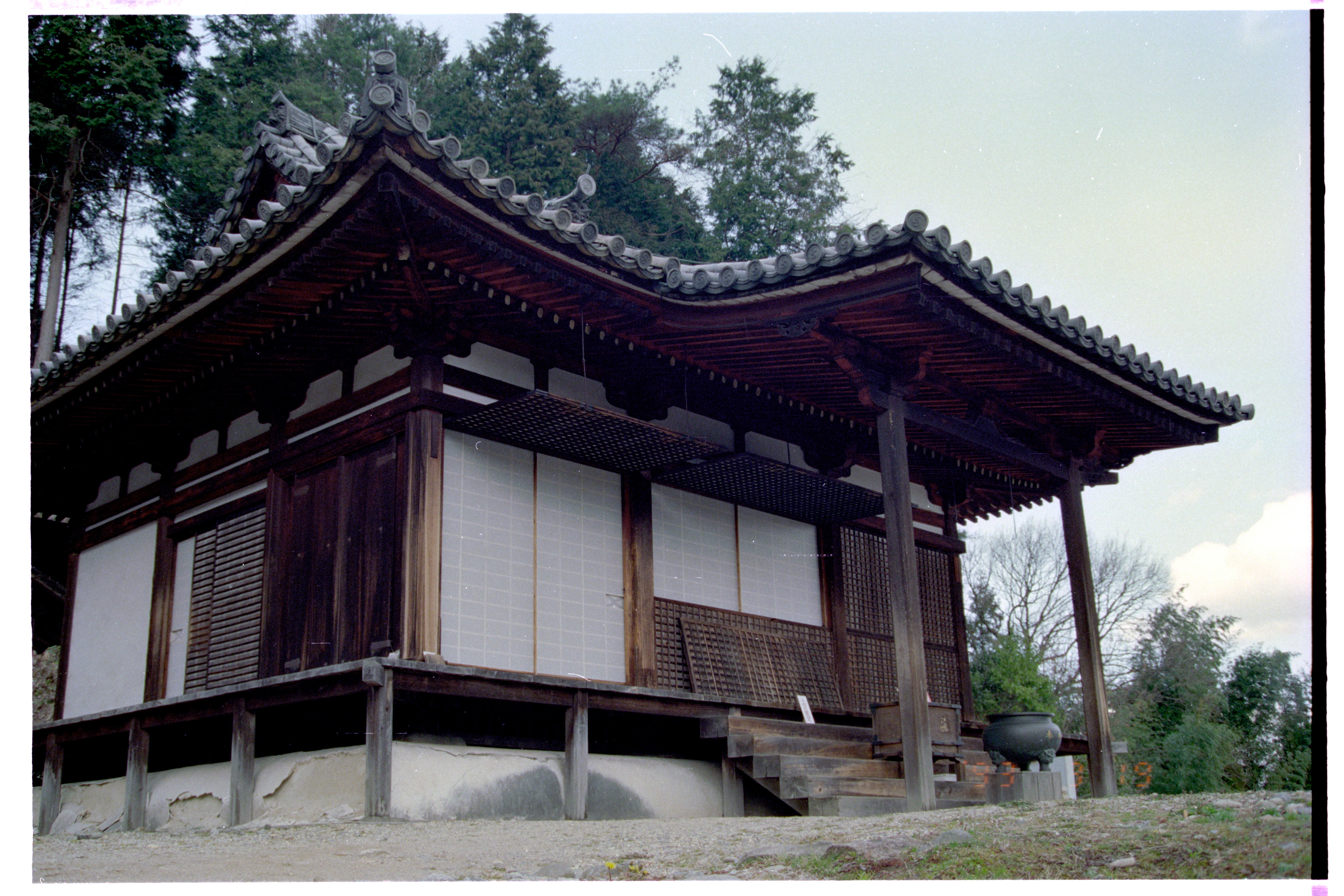
- Main Hall

Religion
- Affiliation: Shingon Ritsu
- Deity: Amida Nyorai Zazō (Seated Amitābha)

Location
- Location: 390 Arisato-chō, Ikoma, Nara Prefecture
- Country: Japan
- Interactive map of Enpuku-ji 円福寺
- Coordinates: 34°40′13.2″N 135°41′56.7″E

Architecture
- Founder: Gyōki (acc. legend)
- Completed: Tenpyō-shōhō era (acc. legend)

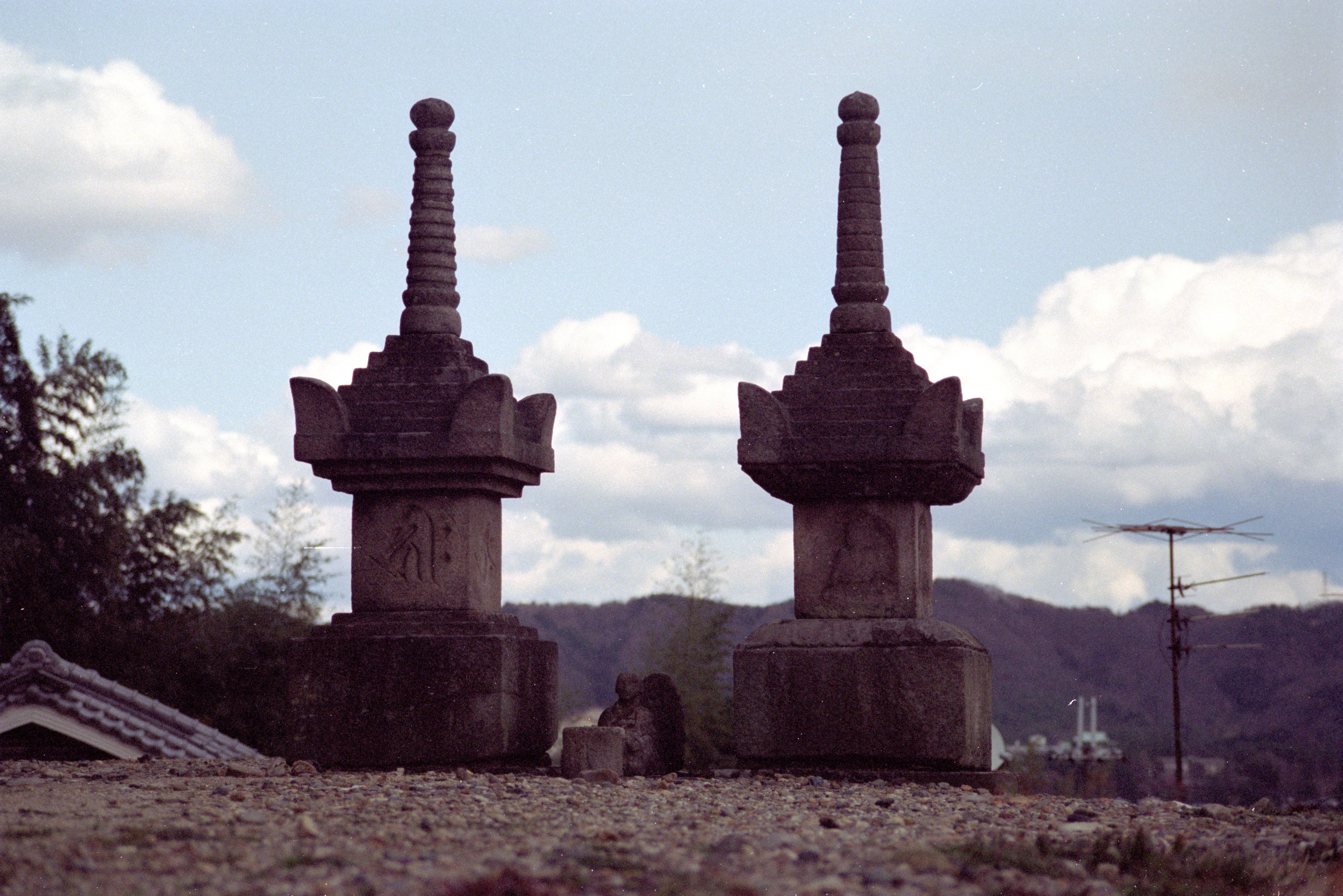
Hōkyōintō Stupas

Enpuku-ji (円福寺) is a Buddhist temple of the Shingon Risshu school, in Ikoma, Nara, Japan. The main object of worship (本尊) is Amida Nyorai.

== History ==
The official history of the temple wrote that this temple was established in the Tenpyo-Shoho years from 749 to 757 by a famous Japanese monk Gyōki (行基), however, the origin of this temple is unclear. Today, as a result of numerous fires over the centuries, the only surviving structure of the temple today is the main hall, built in the Muromachi Period in 1371.

== Cultural properties ==
Enpuku-ji has two Important Cultural Properties selected by Japanese government:

- Its Hondō (Main Hall), built in 1371
- Its Hōkyōintō (a type of stone pagoda), made in 1293

== Access ==
- Ichibu Station of Kintetsu Ikoma Line
