= Kintetsu 7020 series =

Japanese train type

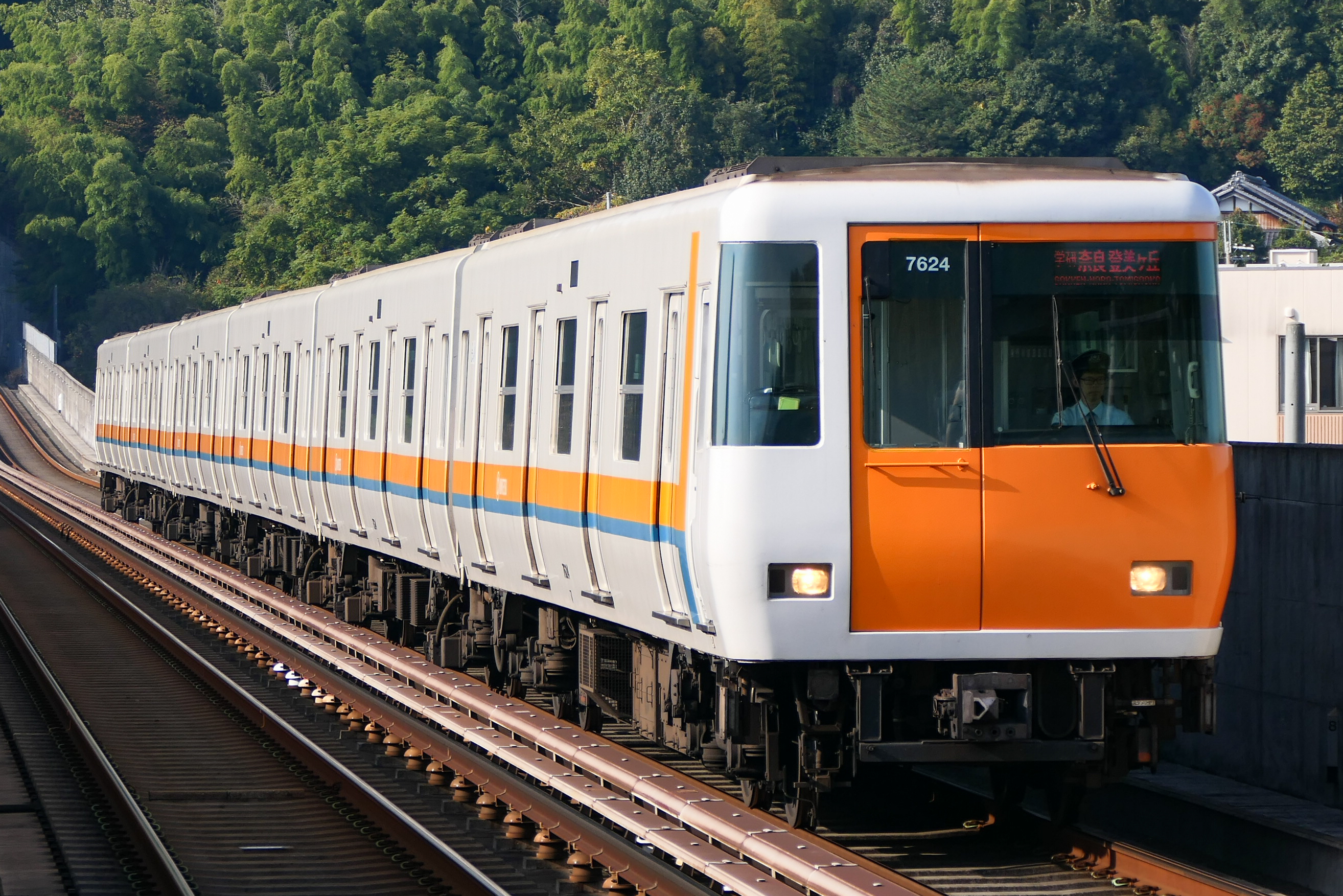
- A 7020 series train, November 2023
- In service: 2004–
- Manufacturer: Kinki Sharyo
- Family name: Series 21
- Constructed: 2004
- Entered service: 1 December 2004
- Number built: 24 vehicles (4 sets)
- Number in service: 24 vehicles (4 sets)
- Formation: 6 cars per trainset
- Fleet numbers: HL21 – HL24
- Operators: Kintetsu Railway
- Depots: Higashihanazono
- Lines served: C Keihanna Line; Chūō Line

Specifications
- Car body construction: Steel
- Car length: 19,000 mm (62 ft 4 in)
- Width: 2,900 mm (9 ft 6 in)
- Doors: 4 pairs per side
- Maximum speed: 95 km/h (59 mph) on the Kintetsu Keihanna Line; 70 km/h (43 mph) on the Osaka Metro Chuo Line
- Traction system: Variable frequency (IGBT)
- Power output: 145 kW per motor
- Acceleration: 3.0 km/(h⋅s) (1.9 mph/s)
- Electric system(s): 750 V DC (third rail)
- Current collector(s): Contact shoe
- Bogies: KD-92
- Braking system(s): Electronically controlled pneumatic brakes
- Safety system(s): WS-ATC
- Track gauge: 1,435 mm (4 ft 8 1/2 in)

The Kintetsu 7020 series (近鉄7020系) is a commuter electric multiple unit (EMU) train type operated by the private railway operator Kintetsu Railway since 2004.

== Design ==
The 7020 series was developed as an improved derivative of the earlier 7000 series, featuring more modern equipment including LED external information displays.

Passenger accommodation consists of longitudinal bench seating throughout. Each seat has a width of 460 mm (18 in), 20 mm (1 in) wider than those of the 7000 series.

== Operations ==
The 7020 series sets operate on Keihanna Line services, including through-running to and from the Osaka Metro Chūō Line.

== Formations ==
Designation	Tc	M	T	M	M	Tc
Numbering	Ku 7120	Mo 7220	Sa 7320	Mo 7420	Mo 7520	Ku 7620
