= Kenji Sato (basketball) =

Japanese basketball player & coach

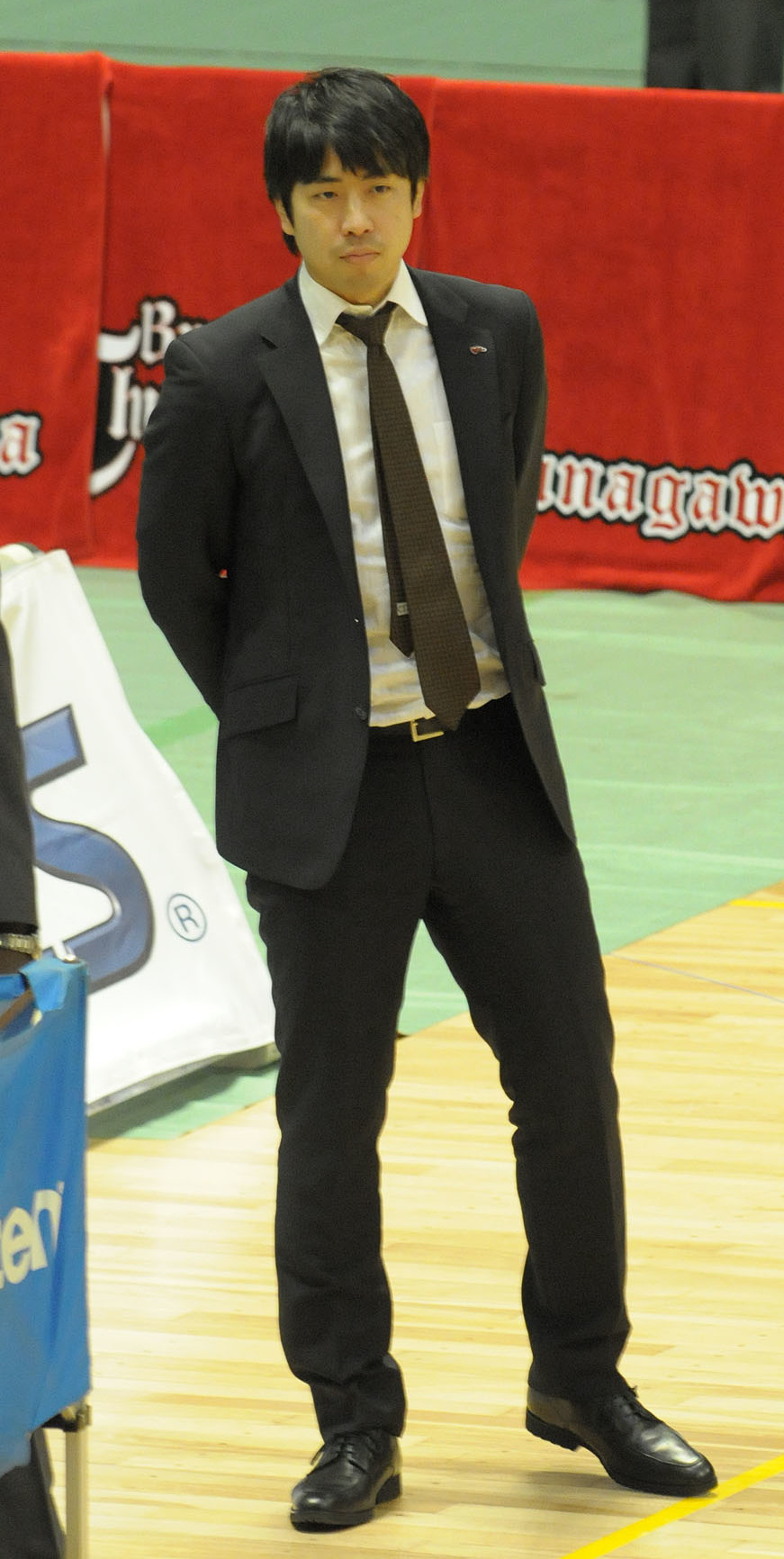

Free Agent
- Position: Head coach

Personal information
- Born: December 14, 1979 (age 46) Ikoma, Nara

Career information
- High school: Rakunan (Kyoto, Kyoto)
- College: Aoyama Gakuin University
- Playing career: 2007–2011

Career history

Playing
- 2007-2011: Toshiba Brave Thunders Kanagawa

Coaching
- 2011-2019: Toshiba Brave Thunders (asst.)
- 2019-2024: Kawasaki Brave Thunders

Career highlights

Kenji Sato (佐藤 賢次, Satō Kenji) is the Head coach of the Kawasaki Brave Thunders in the Japanese B.League.

== Career statistics ==
Legend
GP	Games played	GS	Games started	MPG	Minutes per game
FG%	Field goal percentage	3P%	3-point field goal percentage	FT%	Free throw percentage
RPG	Rebounds per game	APG	Assists per game	SPG	Steals per game
BPG	Blocks per game	PPG	Points per game	**Bold**	Career high

Year	Team	GP	GS	MPG	FG%	3P%	FT%	RPG	APG	SPG	BPG	PPG
2007-08	Toshiba	2		3.0	.000	.000	.000	1.0	1.0	0.0	0.0	0.0
2008-09	Toshiba	7		2.6	.455	.250	1.000	0.4	0.3	0.0	0.0	2.1
2009-10	Toshiba	41		13.9	.310	.290	.750	1.0	1.6	0.3	0.1	3.1
2010-11	Toshiba	36		17.7	.412	.291	.576	1.9	1.9	0.5	0.0	4.2

== Head coaching record ==
Legend
Regular season	G	Games coached	W	Games won	L	Games lost	W–L %	Win–loss %
Playoffs	PG	Playoff games	PW	Playoff wins	PL	Playoff losses	PW–L %	Playoff win–loss %

Team	Year	G	W	L	W–L%	Finish	PG	PW	PL	PW–L%	Result
Kawasaki Brave Thunders	2019-20	40	31	9	.775	1st in Central	-	-	-	–	-
