= Hommachi Station =

Metro station in Osaka, Japan

Hommachi Station 本町駅
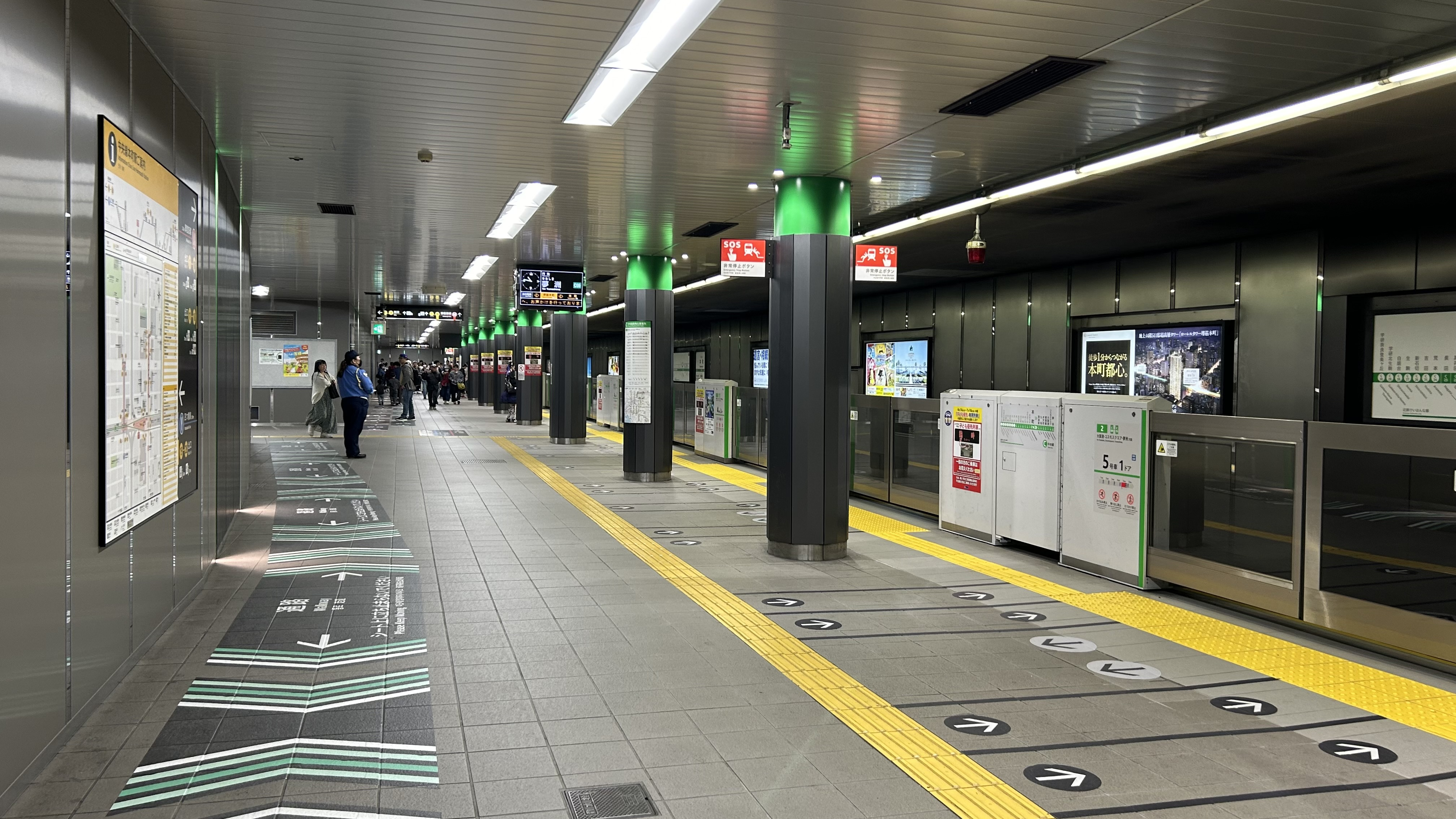
- Chūō Line platform, April 2025

General information
- Other names: Semba-nishi (船場西) (Midōsuji Line and Chūō Line)
- Location: Semba-chūō 4-chōme, Chūō, Osaka, Osaka （大阪市中央区船場中央四丁目） Japan
- Coordinates: 34°40′54.97″N 135°29′56.34″E
- System: Osaka Metro
- Operator: Osaka Metro
- Lines: Midōsuji Line; Chūō Line; Yotsubashi Line
- Platforms: 1 island platform (Midosuji Line); 1 island platform (Chūō Line); 2 side platforms (Yotsubashi Line)
- Tracks: 6
- Connections: Bus stop

Other information
- Station code: M 18 C 16 Y 13

History
- Opened: May 20, 1933; 93 years ago
- Former names: Shinanobashi (信濃橋駅) (Yotsubashi Line, 1965–1969)

Passengers
- FY2016: 217,760 daily

Services
Preceding station	Osaka Metro	Following station
Yodoyabashi M 17 towards Esaka	Midōsuji Line	Shinsaibashi M 19 towards Nakamozu
Awaza C 15 towards Yumeshima	Chūō Line	Sakaisuji-Hommachi C 17 towards Nagata
Higobashi Y 12 towards Nishi-Umeda	Yotsubashi Line	Yotsubashi Y 14 towards Suminoekōen
Location
- Location within Osaka Prefecture Location within Japan

Hommachi Station (本町駅, Honmachi-eki) is a metro station on three lines of Osaka Metro located in Chūō-ku, Osaka, Japan.

== Lines ==
- Osaka Metro
  - Midōsuji Line (M18)
  - Chūō Line (C16)
  - Yotsubashi Line (Y13)

The station on the Yotsubashi Line was opened as Shinanobashi Station (信濃橋駅) in 1965, and was renamed Hommachi Station in 1969.

== Layout ==
The station has an island platform serving two tracks for the Chūō Line on the third basement, an island platform serving two tracks for the Midōsuji Line on the second basement in the east of the platform for the Chūō Line, and two side platforms serving two tracks for the Yotsubashi Line on the first basement in the west of the platform for the Chūō Line.

"Semba-nishi (船場西)" has been shown on the station signs for the Midosuji Line and the Chūō Line since October 2011 to revive the traditional "Semba Brand" in the center of the city of Osaka. "Semba-higashi (船場東)" is shown on the station signs at adjacent Sakaisuji-Hommachi Station, but both names are not announced on the trains as they are not co-station names.

A connecting track is located between the Chūō Line and the Yotsubashi Line (completed in 2014). Morinomiya Workshop was consolidated with Midorigi Workshop in February 2016.

Midosuji Line

1	■ Midōsuji Line	for Namba (east), Tennoji and Nakamozu
2	■ Midōsuji Line	for Umeda, Shin-Osaka and Minoh-kayano

Chūō Line

1	■ Chūō Line	for Tanimachi Yonchome, Morinomiya, Nagata, Ikoma and Gakken Nara-Tomigaoka
2	■ Chūō Line	for Bentencho, Osakako and Yumeshima

Yotsubashi Line

1	■ Yotsubashi Line	for Namba (west), Daikokucho and Suminoekoen
2	■ Yotsubashi Line	for Nishi-Umeda

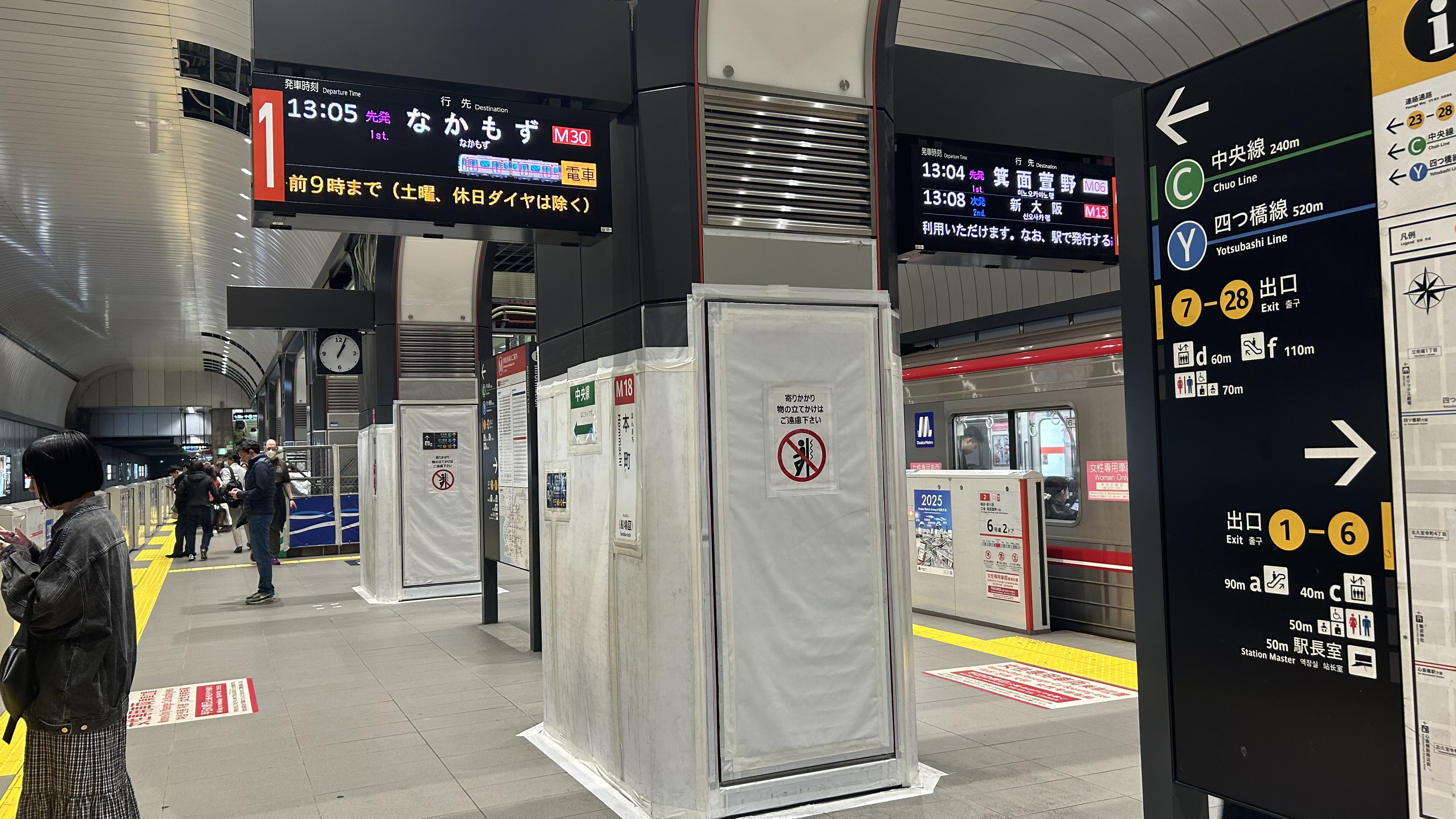
Platform for Midōsuji Line, March 2025

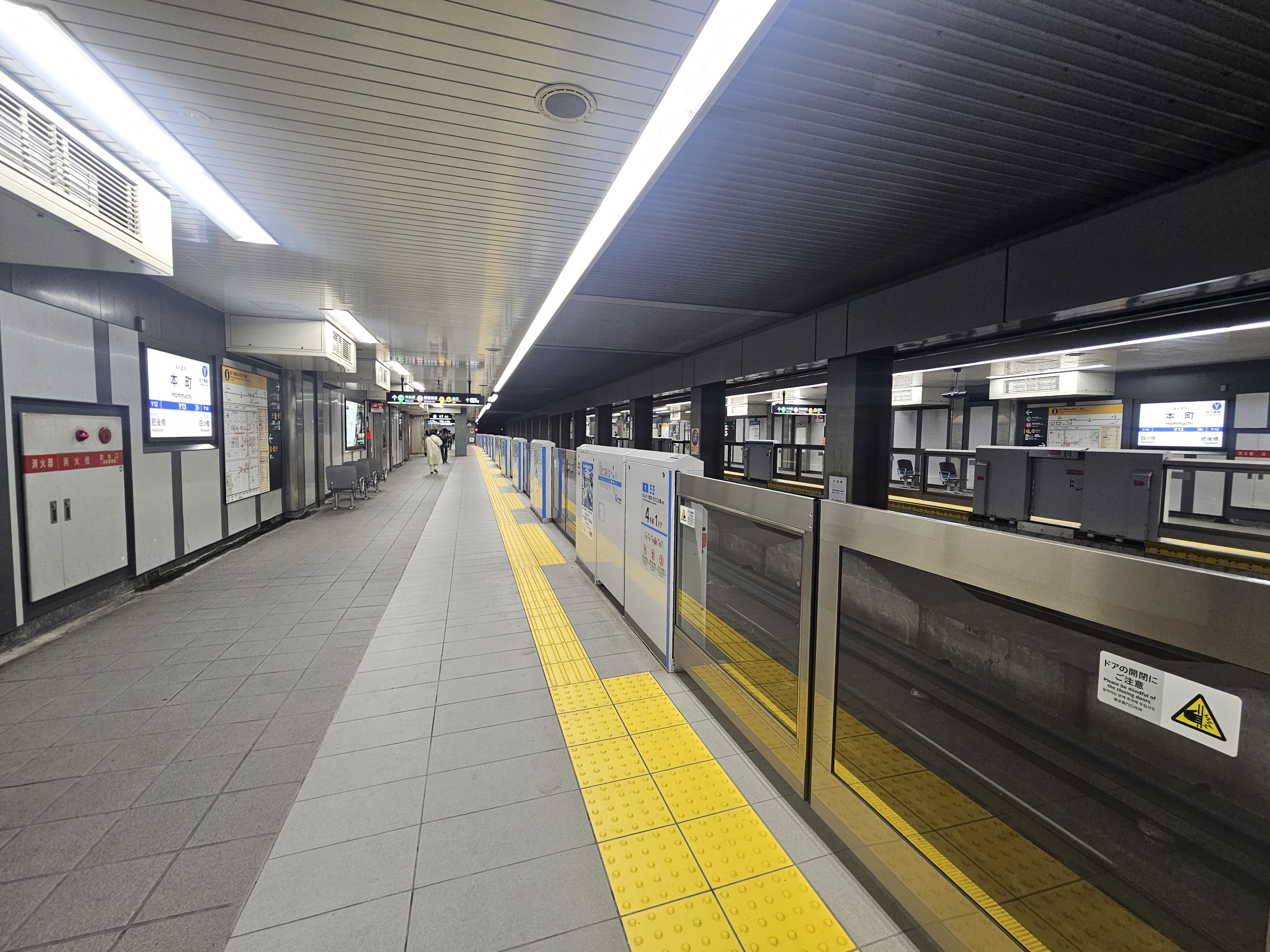
Platform for Yotsubashi Line, March 2025

== Surroundings ==
- Orix
- Resona Bank, Limited.
- Marubeni Osaka Branch
- Yume No Machi Souzou Iinkai Co., Ltd.
- Tsuruya Corporation
- Kita-Mido
- Minami-Mido
- Utsubo Park
- Semba Center Building
- Nihon Ryutsu Sangyo Co., Ltd.
- OSTEC Exhibition Hall
- St. Regis Osaka
