= Nagata Station (Osaka) =

Railway and metro station in Osaka, Japan

Nagata Station 長田駅
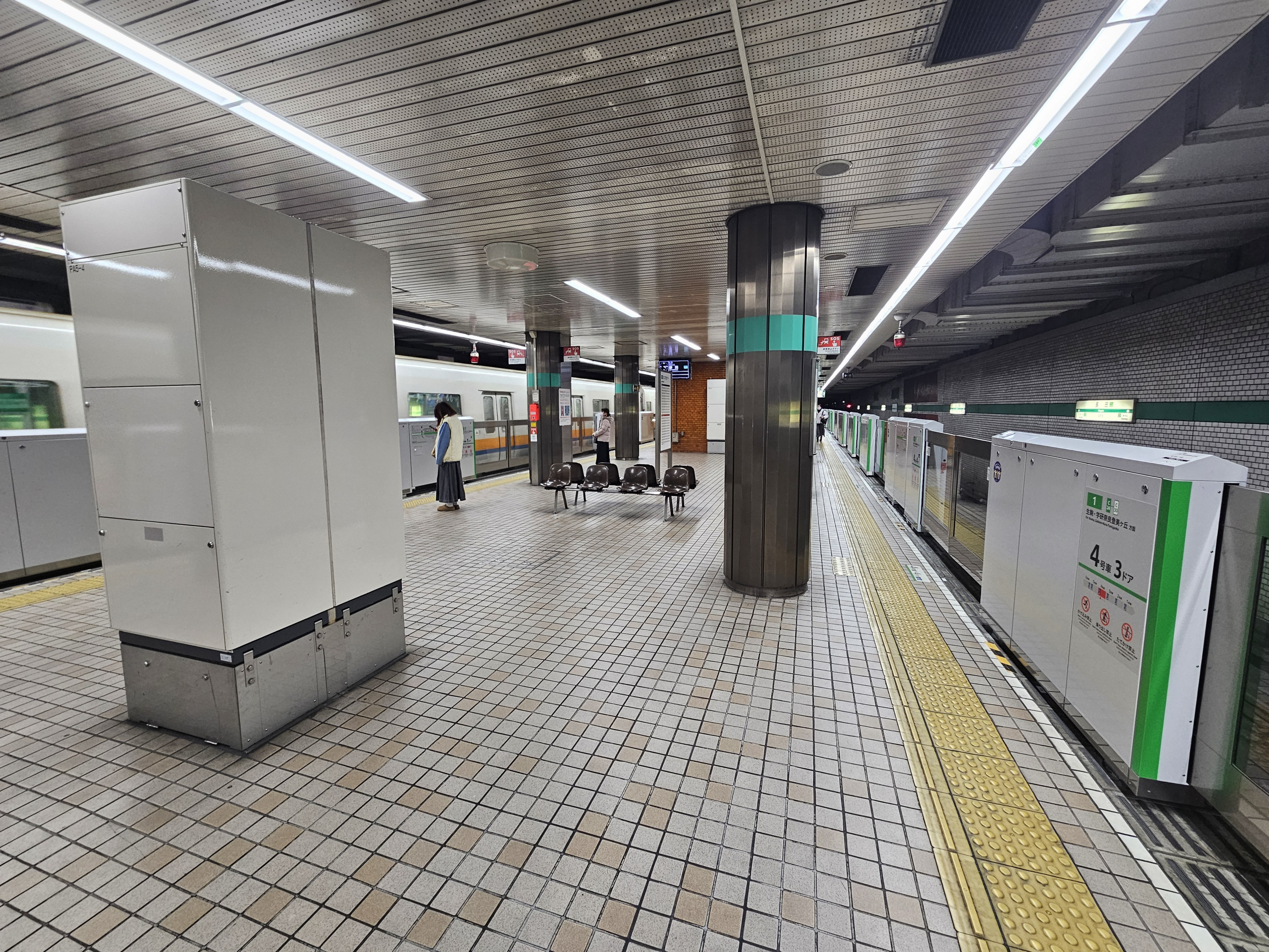
- Station platform

General information
- Location: 21-2, Nagatanaka 2-chome, Higashiōsaka-shi, Osaka-fu （大阪府東大阪市長田中2丁目21-2） Japan
- Coordinates: 34°40′43.55″N 135°35′30.88″E
- System: Osaka Metro
- Operator: Osaka Metro; Kintetsu Railway
- Lines: Chūō Line; C Keihanna Line
- Platforms: 1 island platform
- Tracks: 2

Construction
- Structure type: Underground

Other information
- Station code: C 23

History
- Opened: 5 April 1985; 41 years ago

Passengers
- FY2019: 19,527 (Osaka Metro); 15,467 (Kintetsu)

Services
Preceding station	Kintetsu Railway	Following station
through to Chūō Line	Keihanna Line	Aramoto C24 towards Gakken Nara-Tomigaoka
Preceding station	Osaka Metro	Following station
Takaida C 22 towards Yumeshima	Chūō Line	through to Keihanna Line
Location
- Location within Osaka Prefecture Location within Kansai region Location within Japan

Nagata Station (長田駅, Nagata-eki) is a combined railway and metro station located in the city of Higashiosaka, Osaka Prefecture, Japan. It is jointly operated by the private railway company Kintetsu Railway and the Osaka Metro.

== Lines ==
Nagata Station is served by the underground Chūō Line, and is located 21.1 kilometers (13.1 mi) from the terminus of the line at Yumeshima Station. It is also a terminus of the Kintetsu Keihanna Line and is 18.8 kilometers (11.7 mi) from the opposing terminus of the line at Gakken Nara-Tomigaoka Station. However, no trains terminate here.

== Layout ==
Nagata Station has a single island platform serving two tracks underground.

=== Platforms ===
1	Keihanna Line	for Ikoma and Gakken Nara-Tomigaoka
2	Chūō Line	for Morinomiya, Tanimachi Yonchome, Hommachi, Osakako and Yumeshima

== History ==
The station was opened on April 5, 1985, initially as an Osaka Metro Station. Kintetsu services began on October 1, 1986.

== Passenger statistics ==
In fiscal 2019, the Osaka Metro station was used by an average of 19,527 passengers and the Kintetsu portion of the station by 15,467 passengers daily.

== Surrounding area ==
- Hanshin Expressway No. 13 Higashi Osaka Line
- Japan National Route 308 (Tsukiko Hiraoka Line)

== See also ==
- List of railway stations in Japan
