= Gakken Nara-Tomigaoka Station =

Railway station in Nara, Nara Prefecture, Japan

Gakken Nara-Tomigaoka Station 学研奈良登美ヶ丘駅
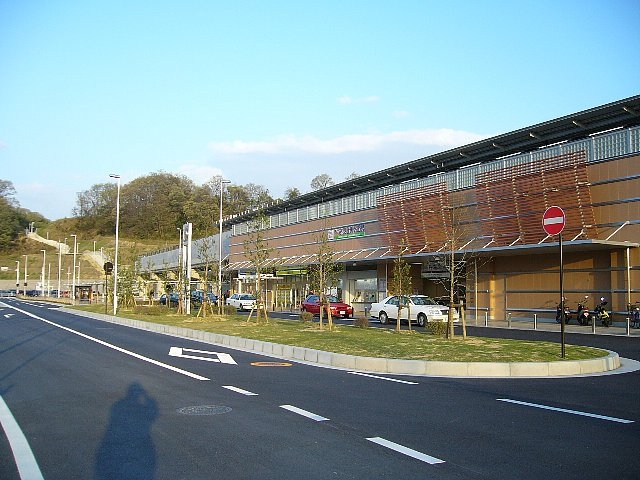
- Gakken Nara-Tomigaoka Station

General information
- Location: 1-1, Naka-Tomigaoka 6-chome, Nara-shi, Nara-ken （奈良県奈良市中登美ヶ丘六丁目1-1） Japan
- Coordinates: 34°43′35.56″N 135°45′8.77″E
- System: Kintetsu Railway commuter rail station
- Owner: Kintetsu Railway
- Operator: Kintetsu Railway
- Line: C Keihanna Line
- Distance: 18.8 km (11.7 miles) from Nagata
- Platforms: 1 island platform
- Tracks: 2
- Train operators: Kintetsu Railway
- Connections: Bus terminal

Other information
- Station code: C30
- Website: www.kintetsu.co.jp/station/station_info/station04011.html

History
- Opened: 27 March 2006

Passengers
- 2019: 7503 daily

Services
Preceding station	Kintetsu Railway	Following station
Gakken Kita-Ikoma towards Yumeshima	Keihanna Line Local	Terminus
Location

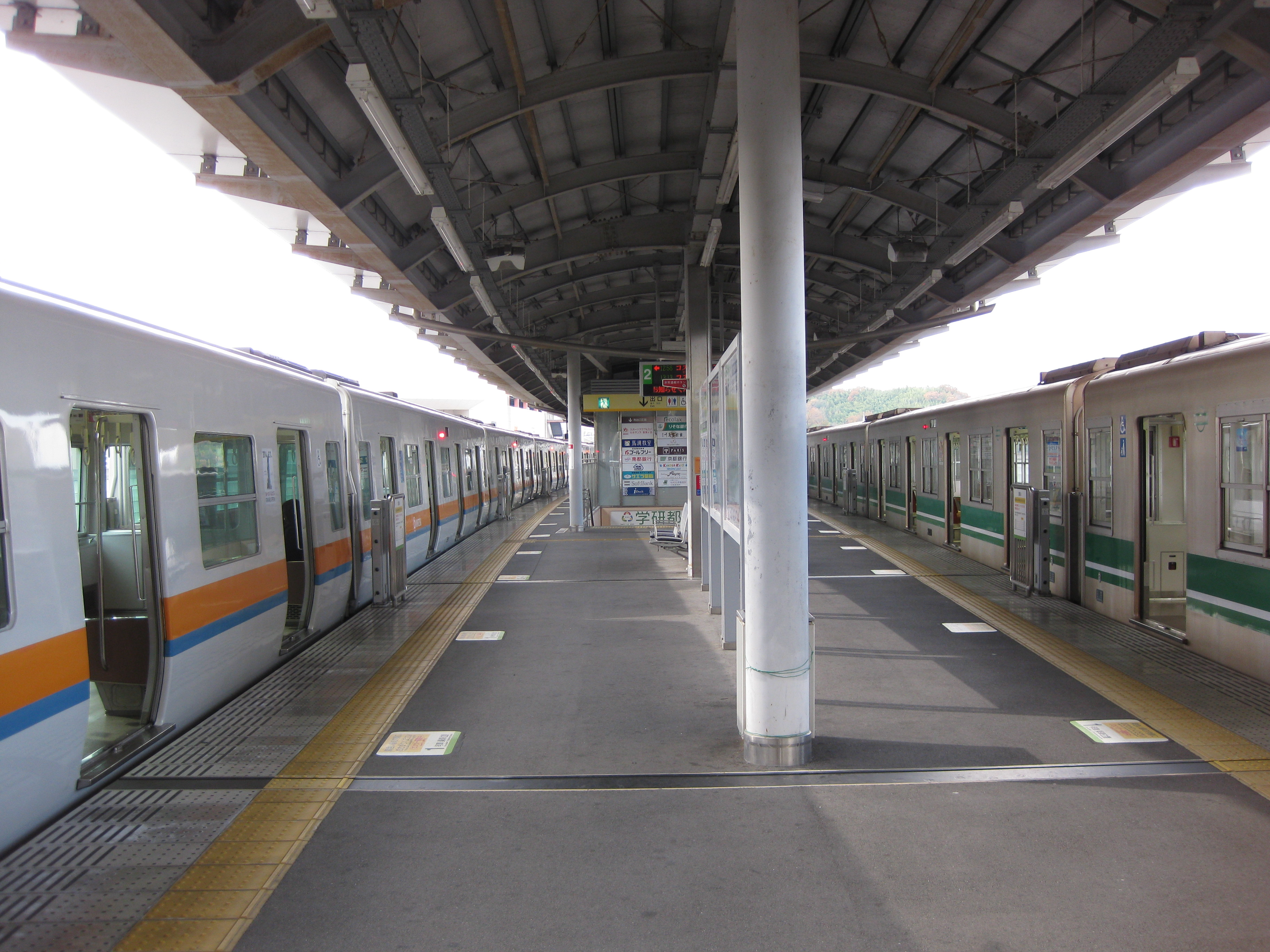
Station platform

Gakken Nara-Tomigaoka Station (学研奈良登美ヶ丘駅, Gakken Nara-Tomigaoka-eki) is a passenger railway station located in the city of Nara, Nara Prefecture, Japan. It is operated by the private transportation company, Kintetsu Railway.

== Line ==
Gakken Nara-Tomigaoka Station is the terminus of the Keihanna Line and is 18.8 kilometers from the starting point of the line at Nagata and 39.9 kilometers from Yumeshima.

== Layout ==
The station consists one elevated island platform and two tracks. The ticket gates and concourse are on the first floor, and the platform is on the second floor. The ticket gates are located on both the north and south sides of the concourse. The platform is equipped with platform sensors. The station is staffed.

== Platforms ==
1, 2	■ C Keihanna Line	for Ikoma, Nagata, Tanimachi Yonchome, Hommachi and Yumeshima

== History ==
Gakken Nara-Tomigaoka Station was opened 27 March 2006.

== Passenger statistics ==
In fiscal 2019, the station was used by an average of 7503 passengers daily (boarding passengers only).

== Surrounding area ==
- Japan National Route 163
- Nara Municipal Tomigaoka Kita Junior High School
- Nara Prefectural International High School

== See also ==
- List of railway stations in Japan
