= Yumeshima Station =

Metro station in Osaka, Japan

Yumeshima Station 夢洲駅
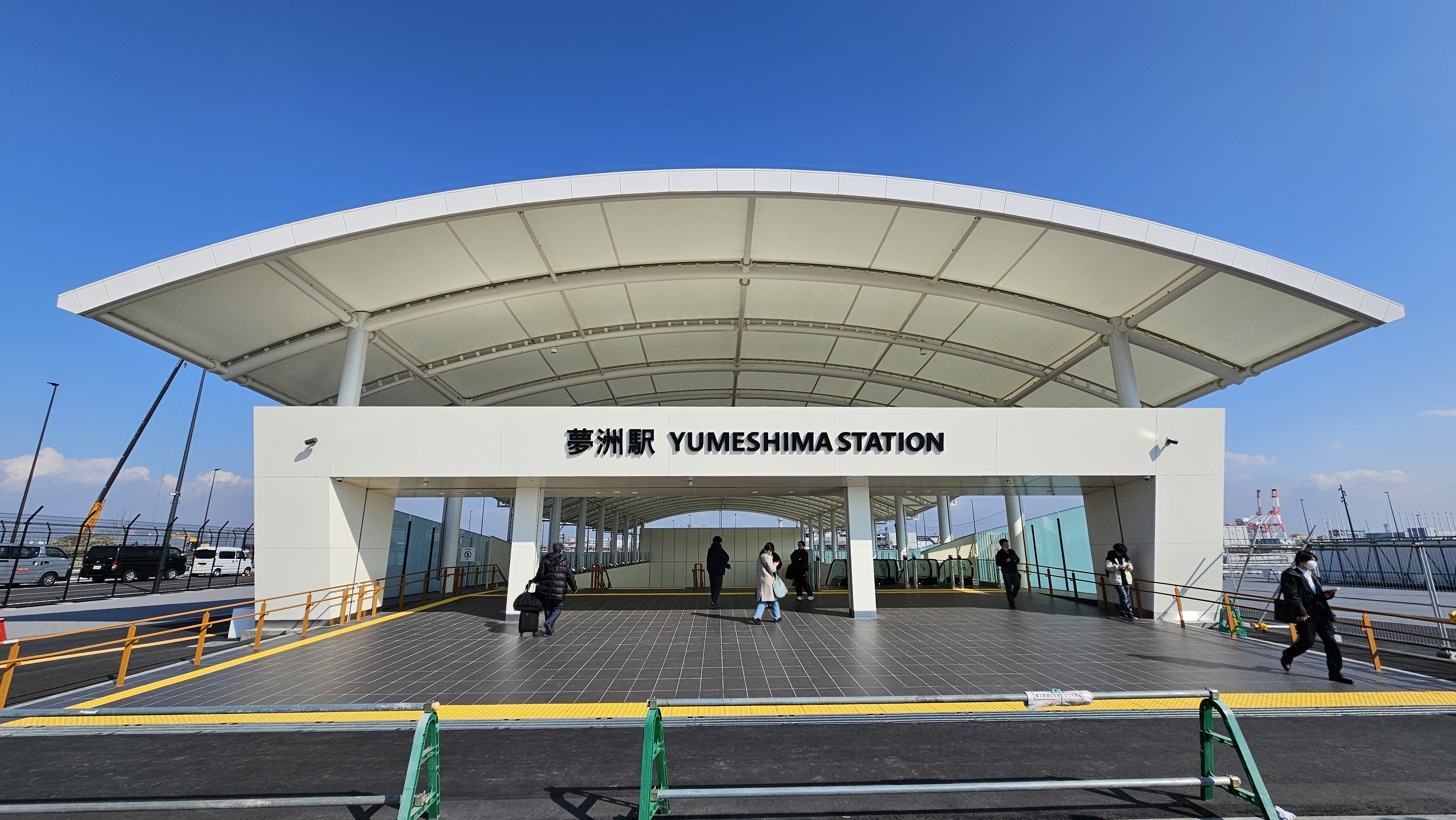
- Yumeshima Station entrance 1

General information
- Location: Yumeshima, Konohana, Osaka, Osaka （大阪市此花区夢洲） Japan
- Coordinates: 34.6520°N 135.3896°E
- System: Osaka Metro
- Operator: Osaka Metro
- Line: Chūō Line
- Platforms: 1 island platform
- Tracks: 2

Other information
- Station code: C 09

History
- Opened: January 19, 2025

Services
Preceding station	Osaka Metro	Following station
Terminus	Chūō Line	Cosmosquare C 10 towards Nagata
Location
- Location within Osaka Prefecture Location within Japan

Yumeshima Station (夢洲駅, Yumeshima-eki) is a metro station on the Osaka Metro Chūō Line in Konohana-ku, Osaka, Japan. It is the westernmost station of the Osaka Metro system. The station was opened as the new terminus of the Osaka Metro Chūō Line, when the line was extended for the Expo 2025 on January 19, 2025.

== History ==
Railway extensions to Yumeshima were planned first back when Osaka was bidding as a host city for the 2008 Summer Olympics, in which Yumeshima was intended to have an Olympic village. However, the extension was cancelled after the bid failed, with only the Yumesaki Tunnel being completed before the construction was stopped. After Osaka was picked to host the Expo 2025 in 2018, Hirofumi Yoshimura, the mayor of Osaka at the time announced that the Osaka Metro Chūō Line will be extended to Yumeshima.

The station was constructed by Obayashi Corporation, Kumagai Gumi, Tokyu Construction, and Toyo Construction. The design of the station was revealed on April 27, 2022. The station opened on January 19, 2025, with an opening ceremony on the same date.

== Details ==
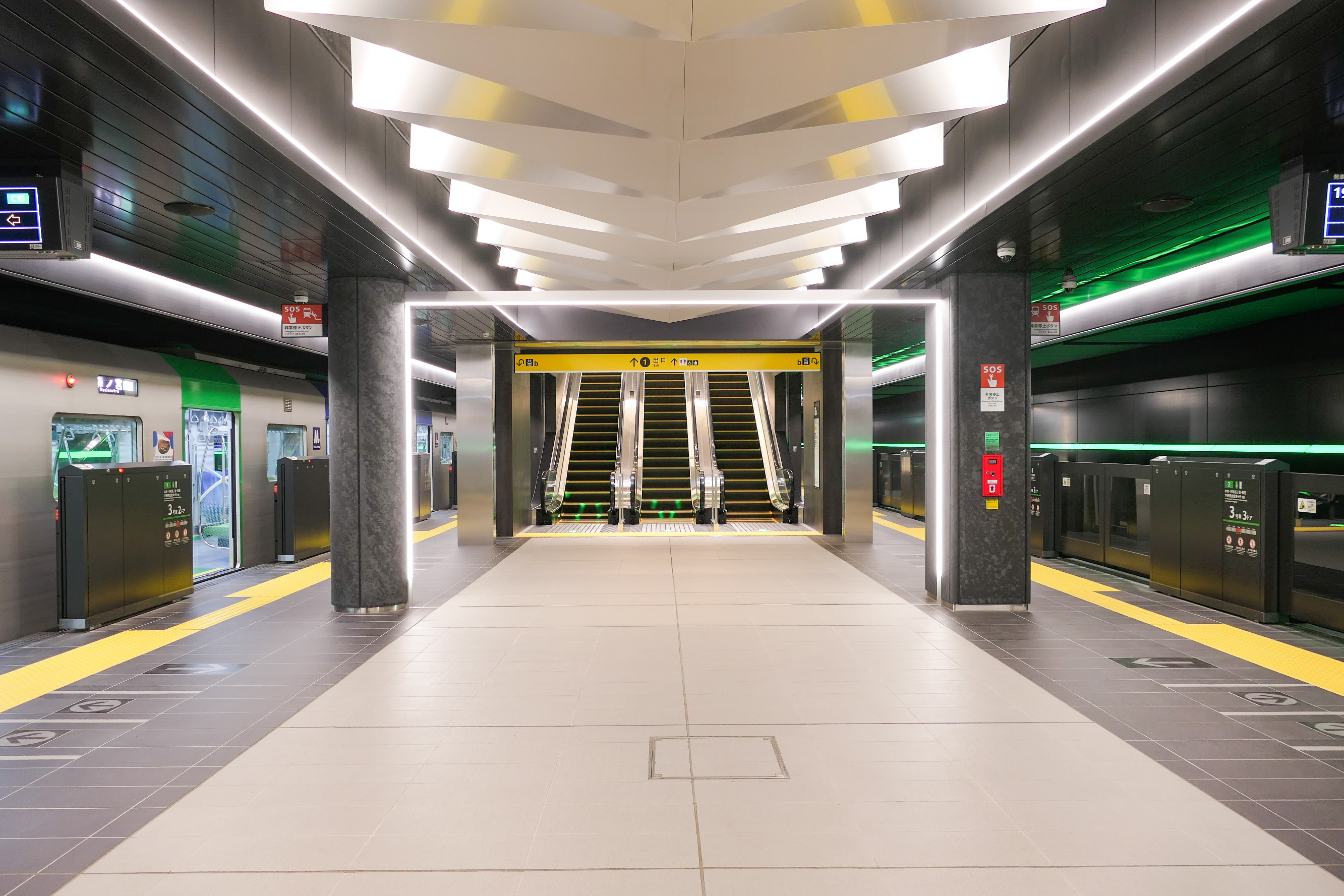
The station platform

Yumeshima Station is the new terminus of the Osaka Metro Chūō Line, located 3.2 kilometers (2.0 mi) away from the adjacent Cosmosquare Station, located northeast of the planned Expo 2025 site. The station is operated by Osaka Metro using infrastructure owned by Osaka Port Transport System. During the opening of the station to the end of the Expo 2025, trains serviced the station from 5:02 am to 12:13 am for the entire week. Train frequencies varied from to 4 to 10 minutes. From October 14, 2025, a day after the end of Expo 2025, the number of services will drop below half of the expo levels, with many instead terminating at Cosmosquare.

The station is built underground in the island of Yumeshima, with the first basement floor being the concourse and the second floor being the station platform. The design concept for the station is "theater of another world". Line-shaped lights will be placed in the center of the platform. Platform screen doors are installed on the platform. The platform has an estimated length of 160 meters, and is 10 meters wide.

1F	Street Level	Exit/Entrance
B1F	Concourse	One-way faregates, ticket/ICOCA/PiTaPa machines, station agent
B2F	Platform 1	→ Chūō Line towards Hommachi, Morinomiya, Nagata, Ikoma, and Gakken Nara-Tomigaoka (Cosmosquare) →
B2F	Island platform, doors will open on the left or right
B2F	Platform 2	→ Chūō Line (Same as platform 1) →
