= Osaka Metro 400 series =

Japanese electric multiple unit train type

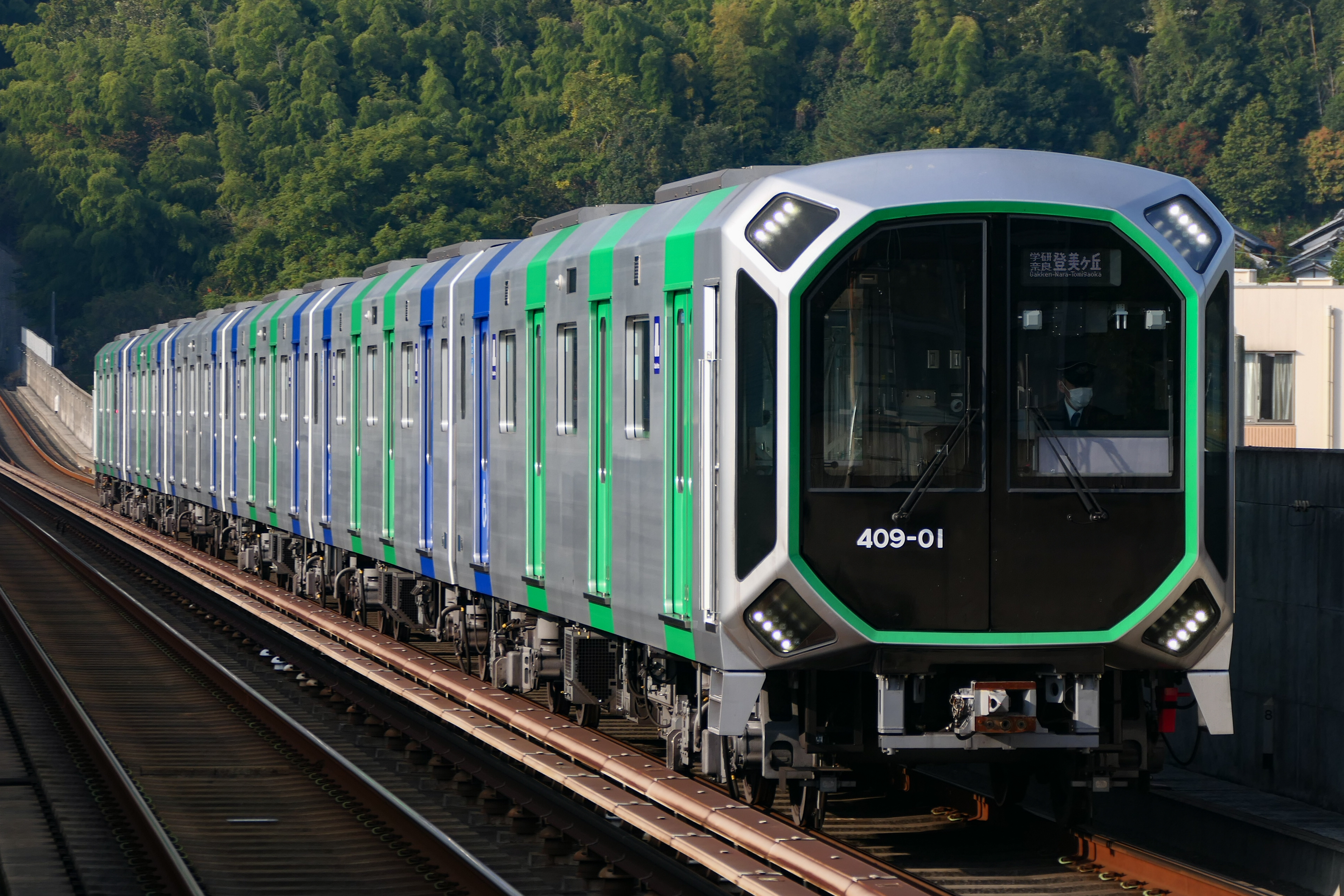
- A 400 series set in November 2023
- In service: 25 June 2023 – present
- Manufacturer: Hitachi Rail
- Designer: Ken Okuyama
- Assembly: Kasado
- Replaced: 20 series; 24 series
- Constructed: 2022–
- Number under construction: 78 vehicles (13 sets)
- Number built: 60 vehicles (10 sets) as of December 2023
- Formation: 6 cars per set
- Capacity: 125 (end cars); 139 (most int. cars); 140 (408-xx cars only)
- Operator: Osaka Metro
- Lines served: Osaka Metro Chūō Line; C Kintetsu Keihanna Line

Specifications
- Car body construction: Aluminium
- Electric systems: 750 V DC third rail
- Current collection: Contact shoe
- Track gauge: 1,435 mm (4 ft 8 1/2 in) standard gauge

The Osaka Metro 400 series (Japanese: 大阪メトロ400系, Hepburn: Ōsaka Metoro 400-kei) is an electric multiple unit (EMU) train type built by Hitachi Rail for Osaka Metro. Entering service on 25 June 2023, a total of 23 six-car sets are to be built.

== Operations ==
A total of 23 six-car sets are due to be introduced ahead of the 2025 World Expo, and to replace the 20 and 24 series trainsets currently in use on the Chūō Line. The 400 series is the first new Osaka Metro rolling stock type to be ordered following the privatization of the Osaka Municipal Transportation Bureau.

== Design ==
The design of the 400 series was overseen by Ken Okuyama.

=== Exterior ===
The exterior design of the 400 series is intended to resemble that of a spaceship, featuring an octagonal front end and headlight clusters at each of the four corners. The 400 series was developed in consideration of the 2025 World Expo, high levels of comfort and safety, accessibility, and to be "fun to ride". In addition, the train type has a lower floor height than its predecessors, as well as more clearly marked priority seating. The sets use aluminium for body construction.

=== Interior ===
The interior incorporates calm color palette, and the longitudinal seats use a varied color palette.

Passenger accommodation consists of longitudinal seating throughout, except for one car, which features transverse seating. Priority seating is provided. Passenger information displays are provided, displaying information in Japanese, English, Chinese, and Korean.

The 400 series was originally designed with a full-glass door between the passenger cabin and the crew compartment, but due to structural issues, sets used a half-glass door instead.

The luggage racks are 10 millimetres (0.39 in) lower than those of other train types.

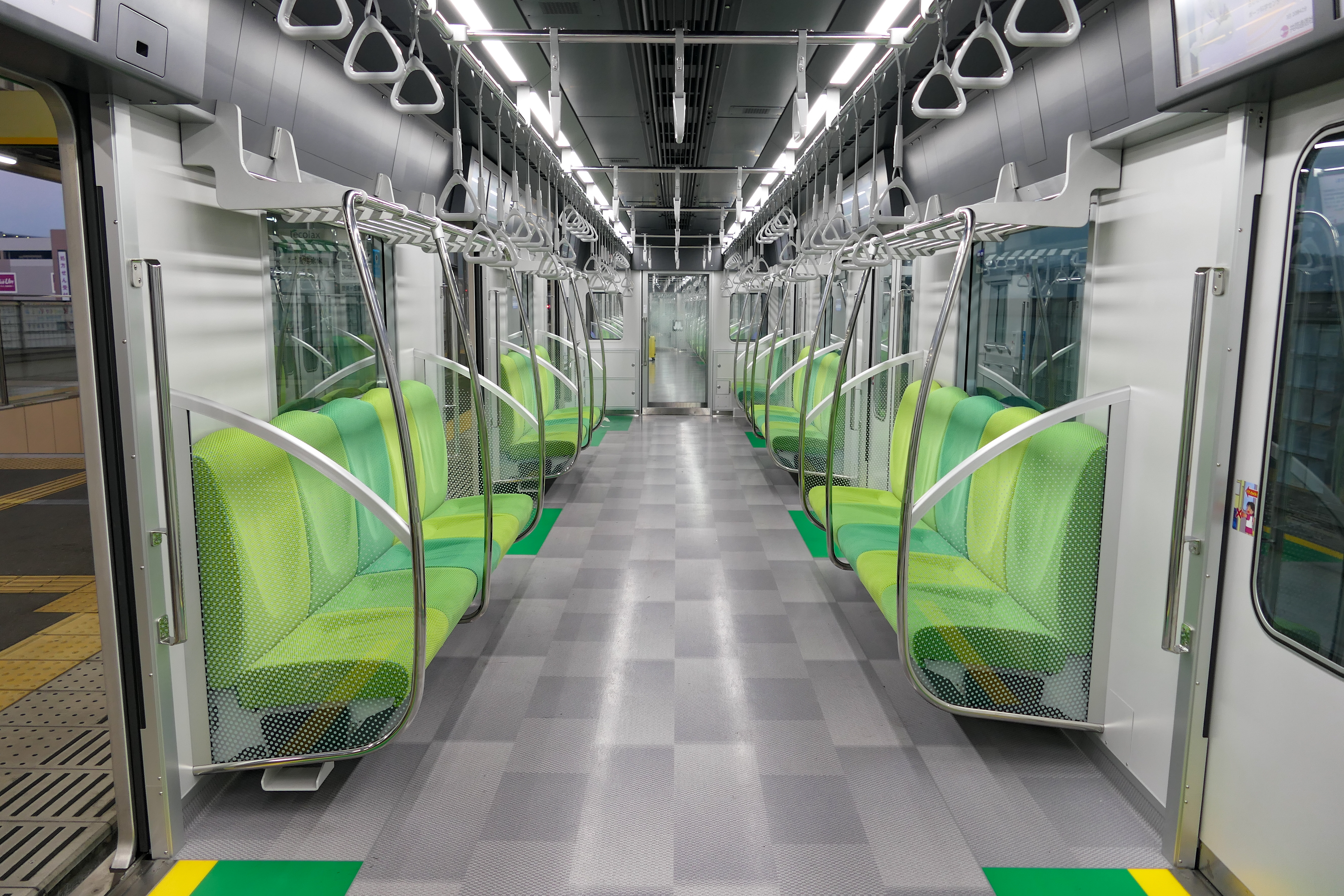
Interior

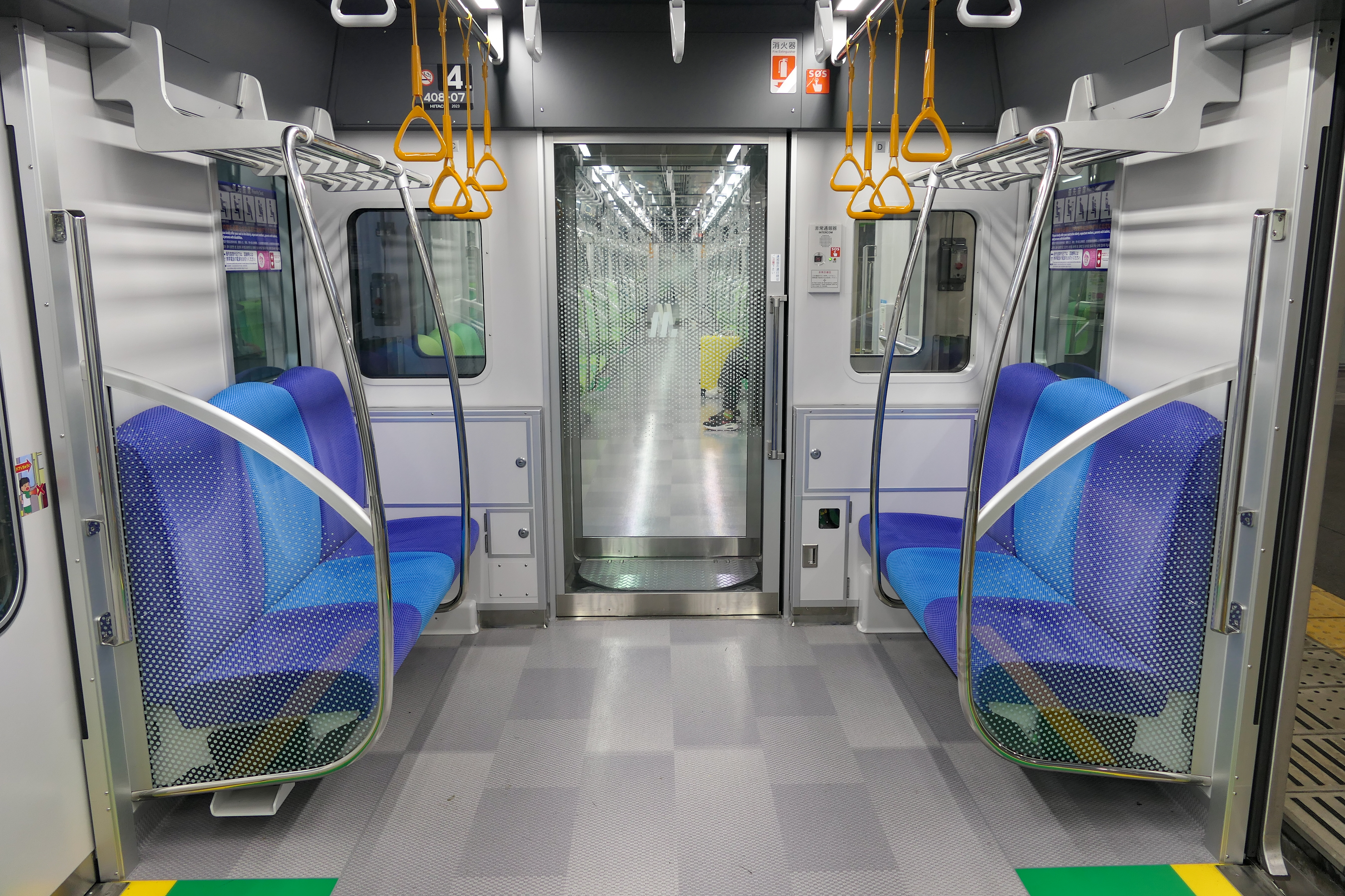
Priority seating

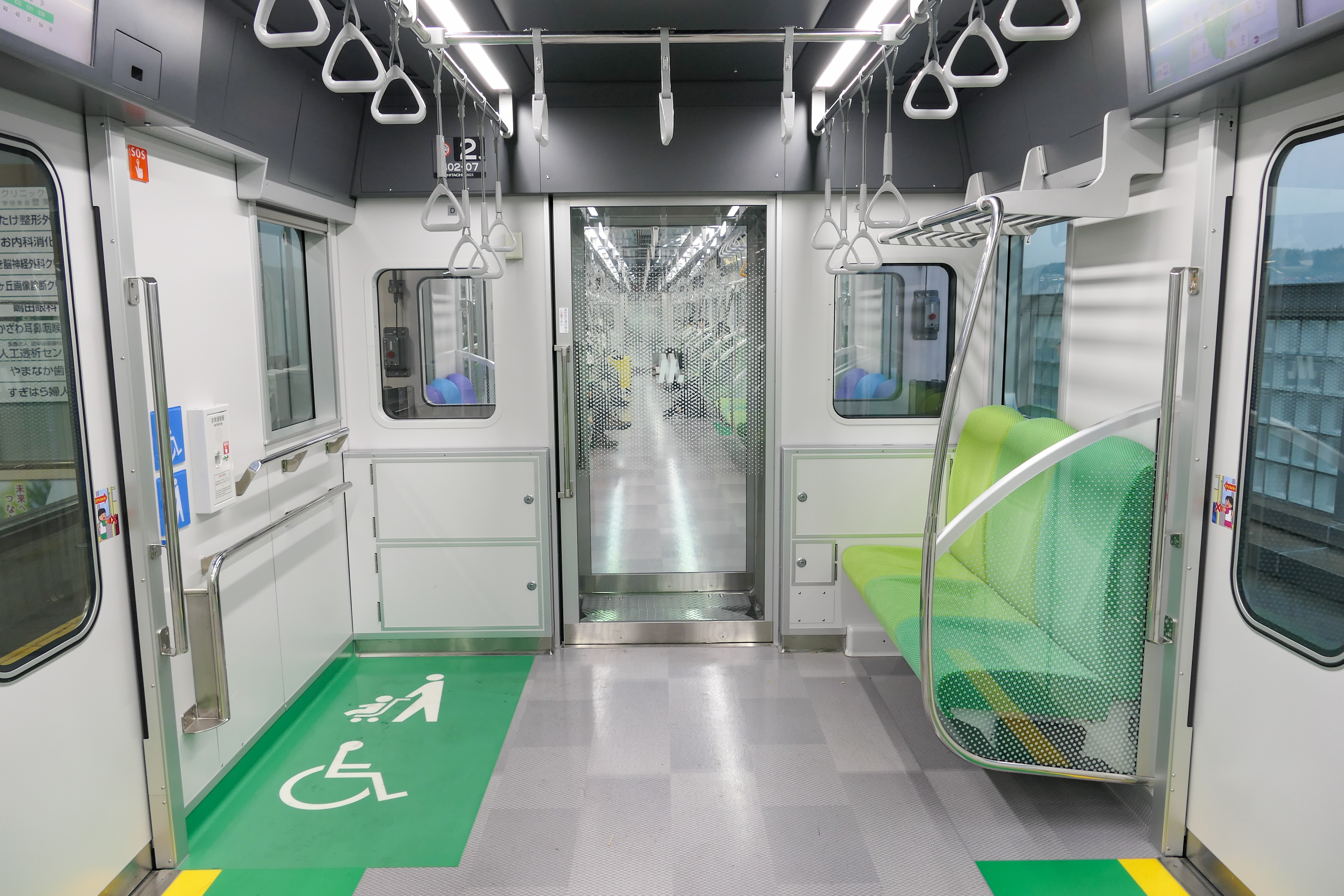
Wheelchair space at left

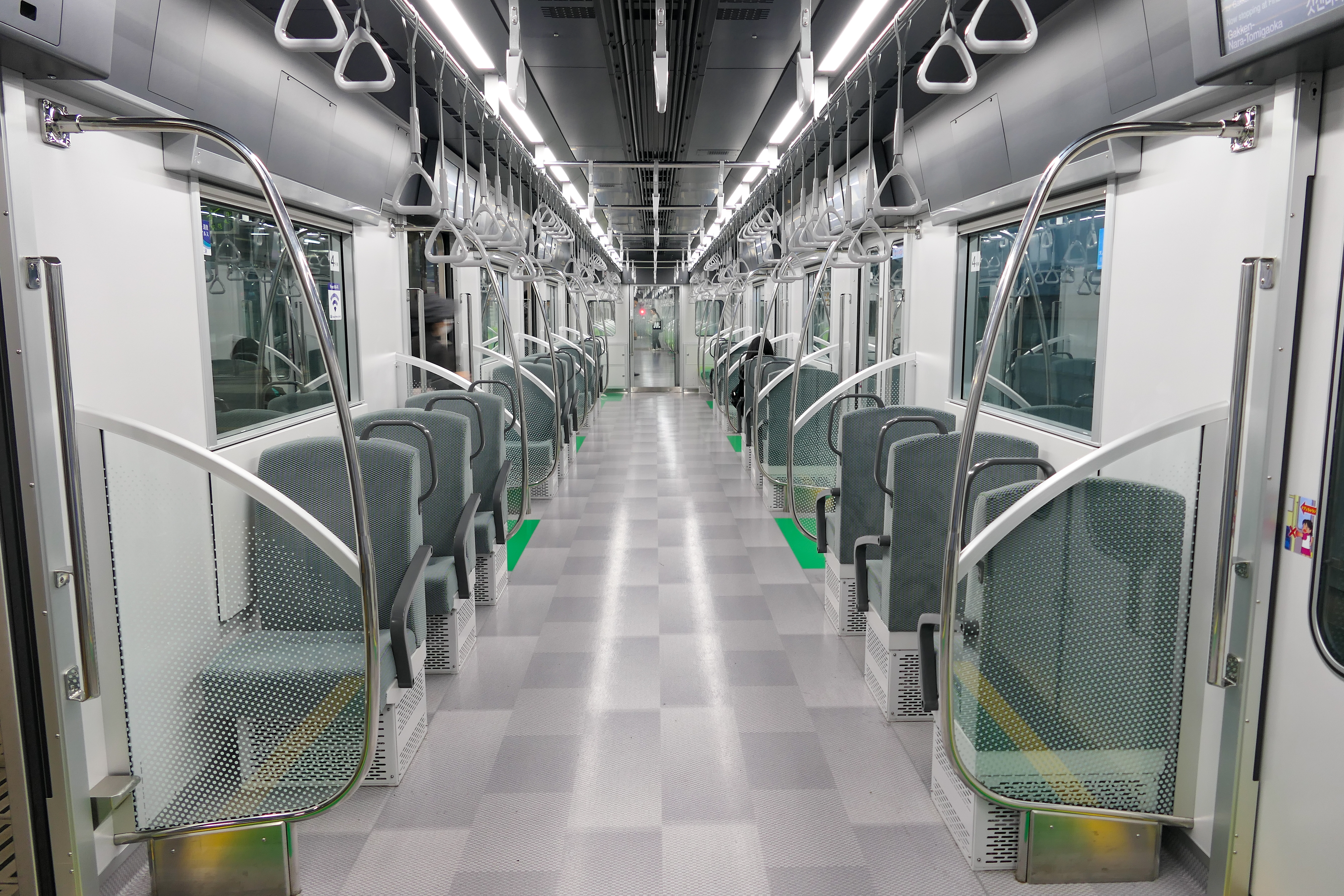
Transverse seating

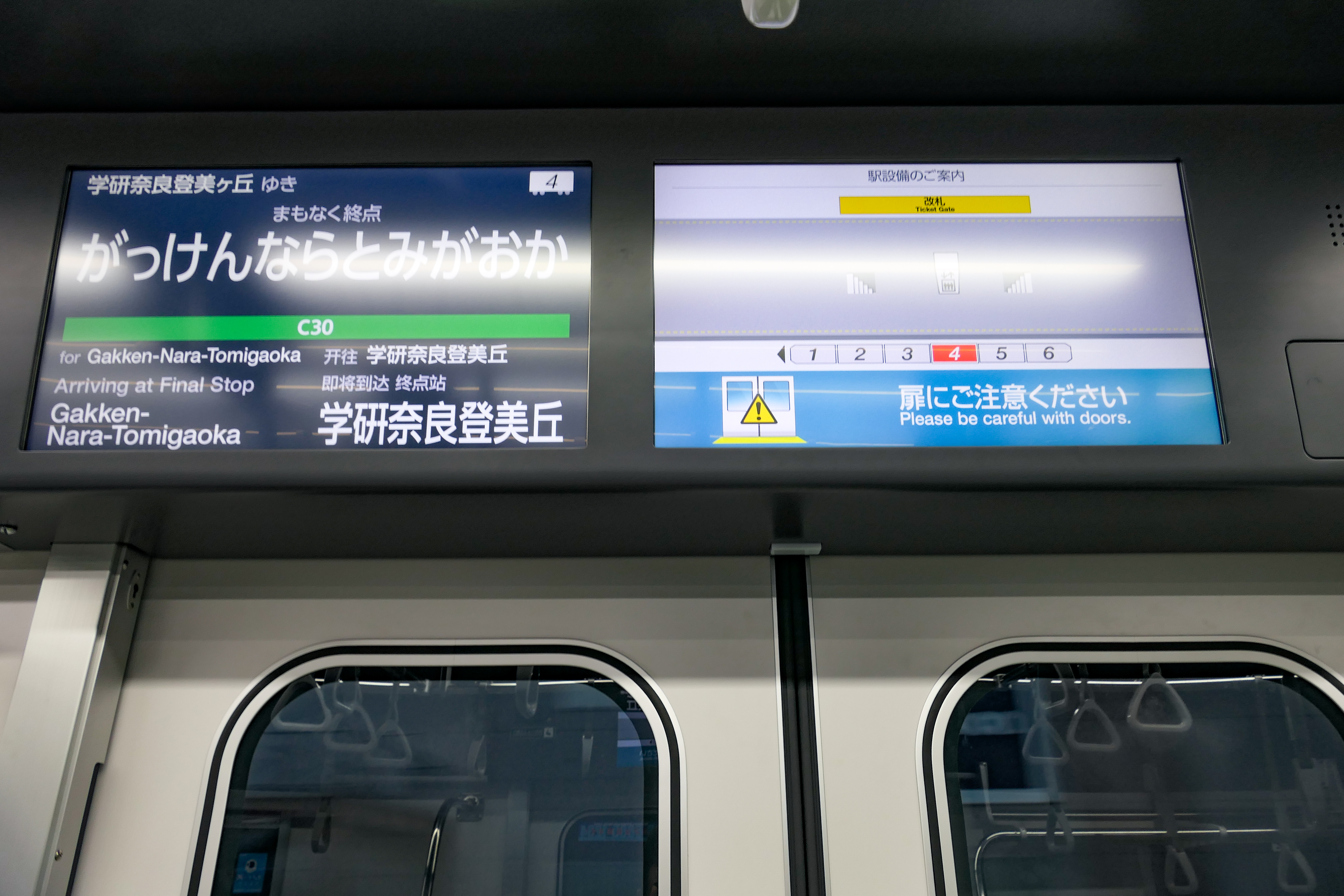
LCD information display

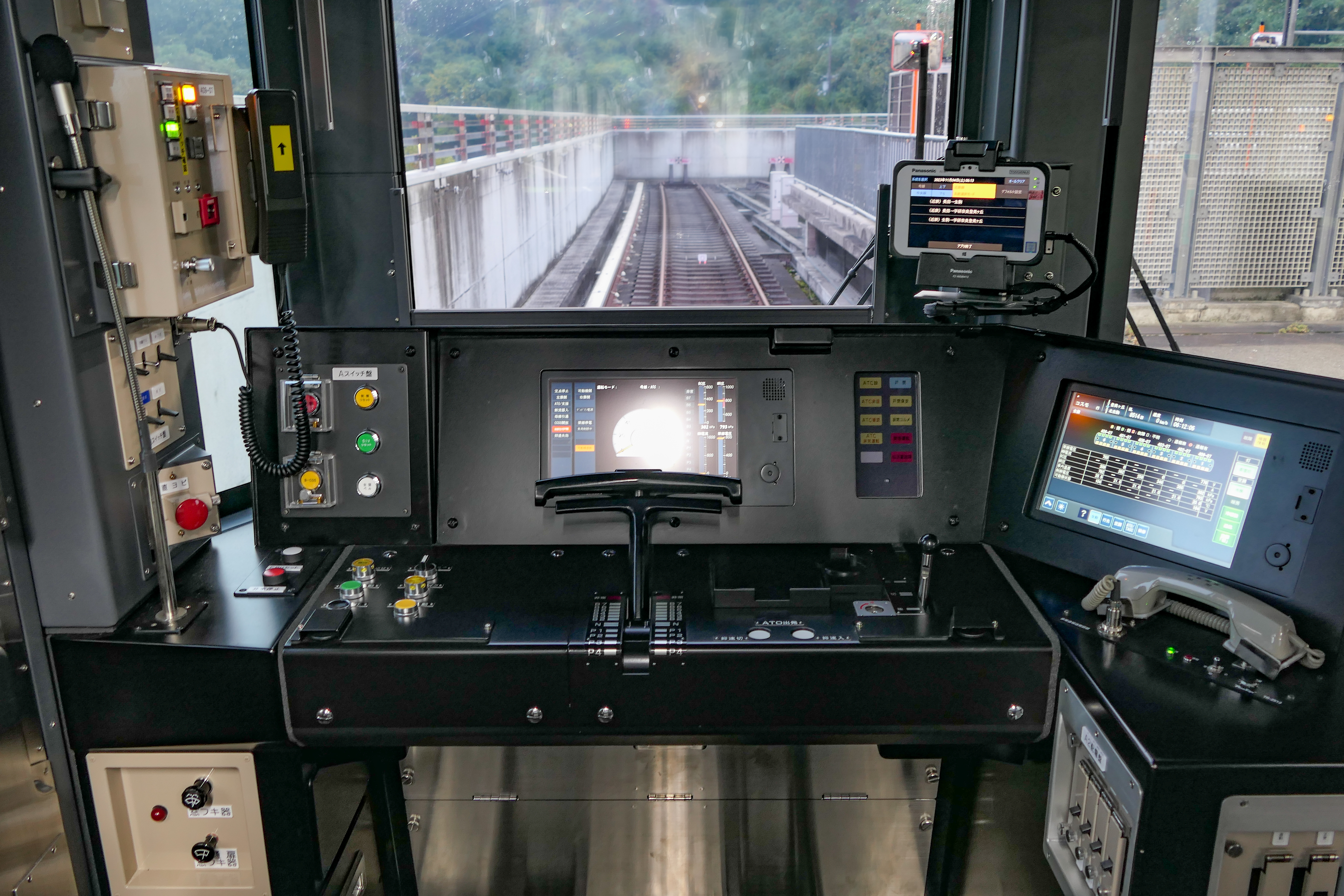
Driver's cab

== Formation ==
The sets are formed as follows.

Numbering	409-01	402-01	403-01	408-01	401-01	406-01

== History ==
The trains were first formally announced by Osaka Metro on 9 December 2021. Production of the 400 series fleet commenced in 2022, and the first set was delivered from Hitachi's Kasado plant in October of that year. On 7 December 2022, Osaka Metro unveiled the first 400 series to the press.

It was originally intended that the 400 series would enter service in April 2023; however, its introduction was deferred to 25 June. Of the 23 sets to be produced, 12 were expected to enter service in fiscal 2023.

On 23 May 2024, the 400 series received the Laurel Prize, presented annually by the Japan Railfan Club.
