= Osaka Municipal Subway 20 series =

Japanese train type

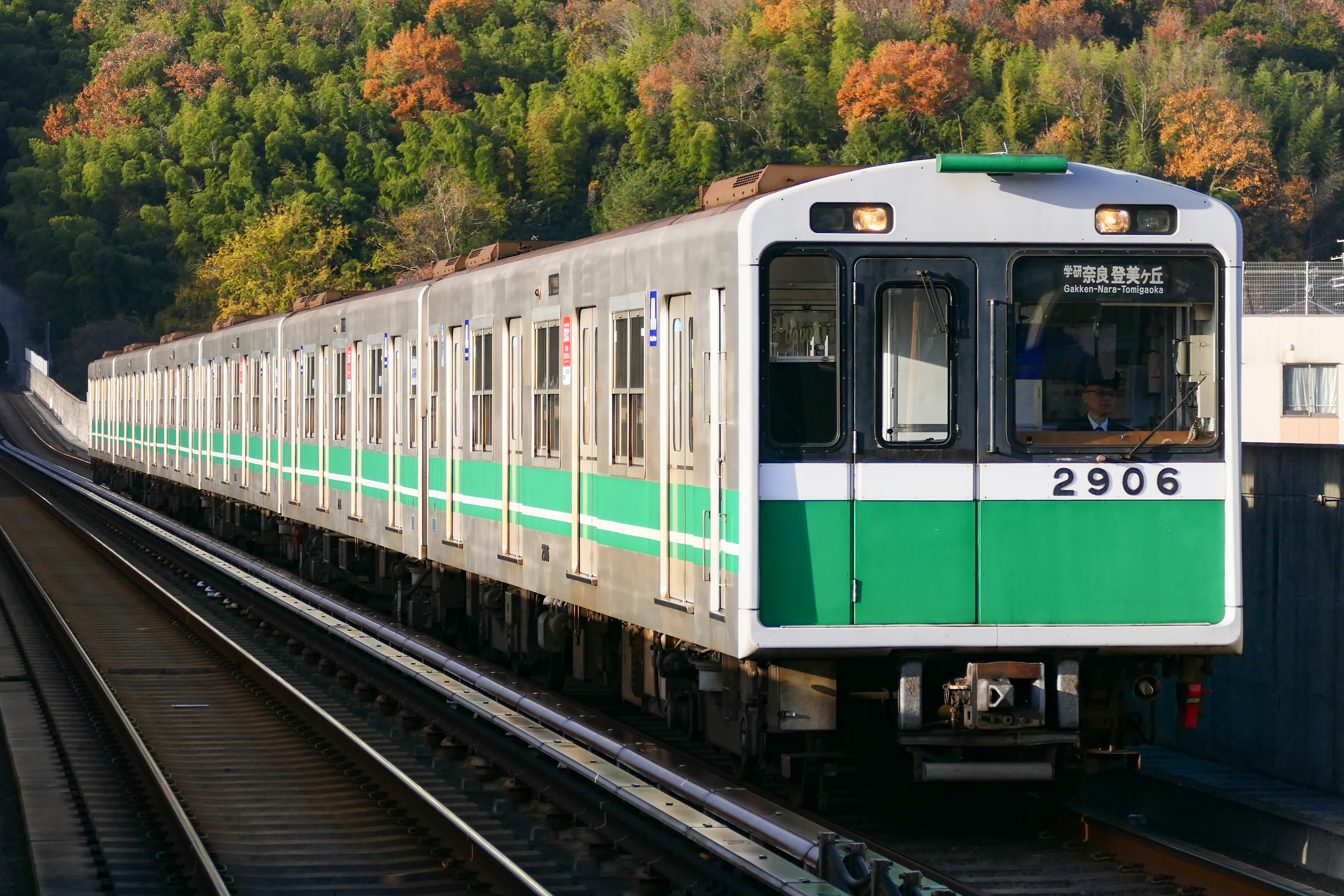
- A 20 series trainset on the Kintetsu Keihanna Line in December 2023
- In service: 1984–March 2024
- Manufacturer: Hitachi, Kawasaki Heavy Industries, Kinki Sharyo, Tokyu Car Corporation
- Constructed: 1984–1989
- Entered service: 24 December 1984
- Number built: 96 vehicles (16 sets)
- Number in service: None
- Formation: 6 cars per trainset
- Fleet numbers: 2601–2607, 2631–2639
- Operators: Osaka Municipal Transportation Bureau (1984–2018); Osaka Metro (2018–2024)
- Depots: Dainichi, Midorigi, Morinomiya, Yao
- Lines served: Chūō Line; C Kintetsu Keihanna Line; Tanimachi Line (1989–2006)

Specifications
- Car body construction: Aluminium alloy
- Doors: 4 pairs per side
- Maximum speed: 95 km/h (59 mph)
- Traction system: GTO–VVVF (as built); IGBT–VVVF (after refurbishment)
- Electric system(s): 750 V DC
- Current collection: Third rail contact shoes
- Safety system(s): WS-ATC
- Track gauge: 1,435 mm (4 ft 8 1/2 in)

The Osaka Municipal Subway 20 series (大阪市交通局20系) was a rapid transit electric multiple unit (EMU) train type operated by Osaka Municipal Subway (now Osaka Metro) in Japan between 1984 and 2024.

== Design ==
The trains have aluminium bodies. The 20 series was the first Japanese train type powered by a third rail to use variable-frequency drive (VVVF) technology from new, the second overall in Japan (after the Kumamoto City Transportation Bureau 8200 series LRV and only the third such train type in the world (the HKL Class M100 for Helsinki Metro being the first overall). The VVVF technology used on the 20 series was developed jointly by Hitachi, Mitsubishi Electric and Toshiba. They were also the first trains on the Chūō and Tanimachi lines to include air-conditioning from new.

== History ==
The first set, 2601, was built on 25 March 1984, entering revenue service on the Chūō Line on 24 December of the same year. Four additional sets were built in 1985 to complement the opening of the Chuo Line extension to Nagata. In 1989, eleven more sets were built of which nine of them were allocated to the Tanimachi Line.

From 2004, in preparation for the opening of the Keihanna Line extension to Gakken Nara-Tomigaoka in 2006, all 20 series sets were retrofitted with IGBT-based traction control systems and the maximum speed of all trains was increased from 70 km/h (43 mph) to 95 km/h (59 mph). In addition, all Tanimachi Line sets were transferred to the Chuo Line in March 2006 in exchange for nine 24 series sets which were redeployed on the Tanimachi Line.

=== Withdrawal ===
Retirement of the 20 series fleet began in 2014 with the first set being removed from service on 21 August. It was replaced by a 24 series set that was transferred from the Yotsubashi Line. With the introduction of new 30000A series and 400 series EMUs, withdrawals of 20 series sets continued in August 2022. The last run took place on 20 March 2024.

== Gallery ==
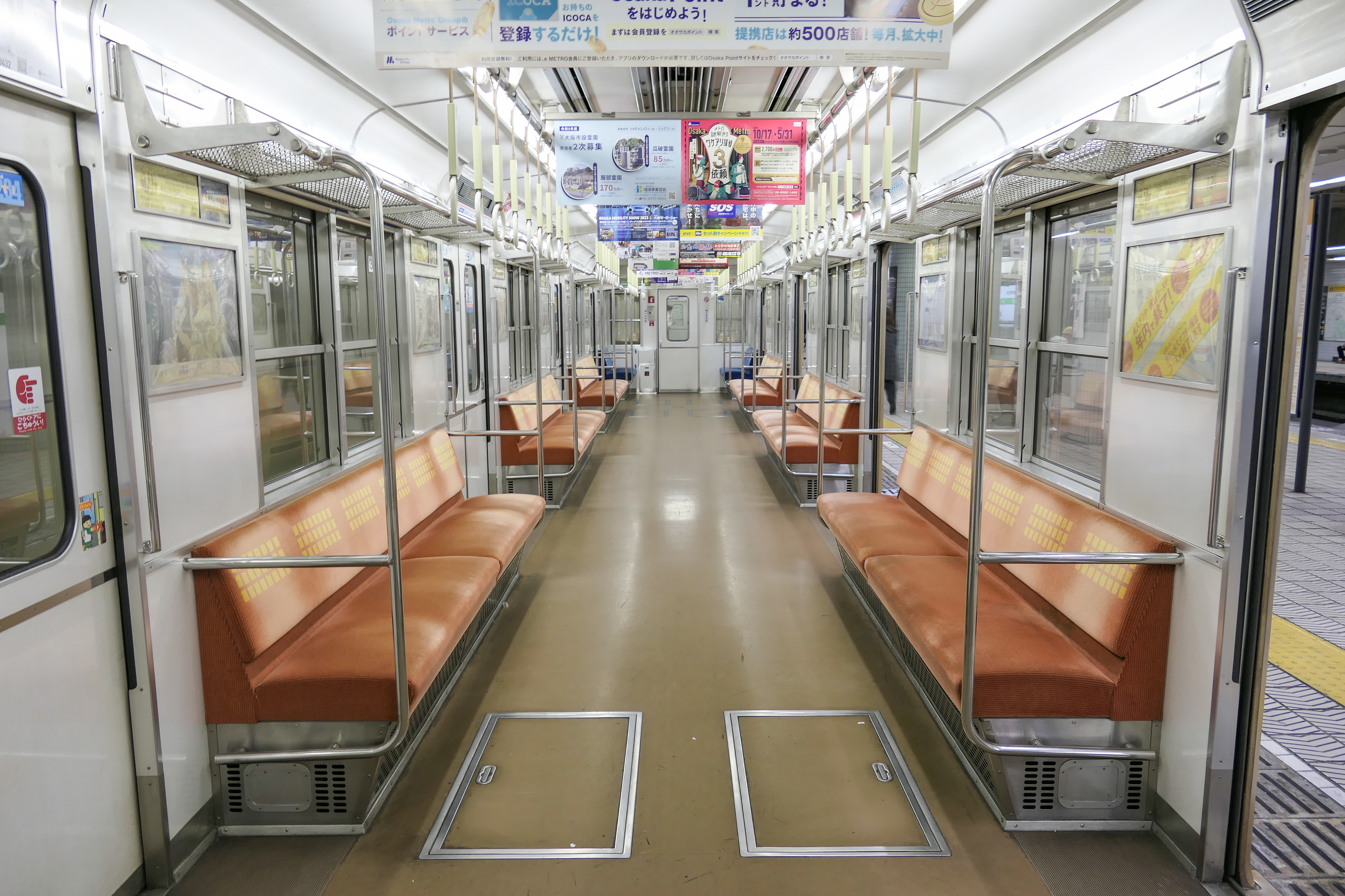
Interior of a 20 series car

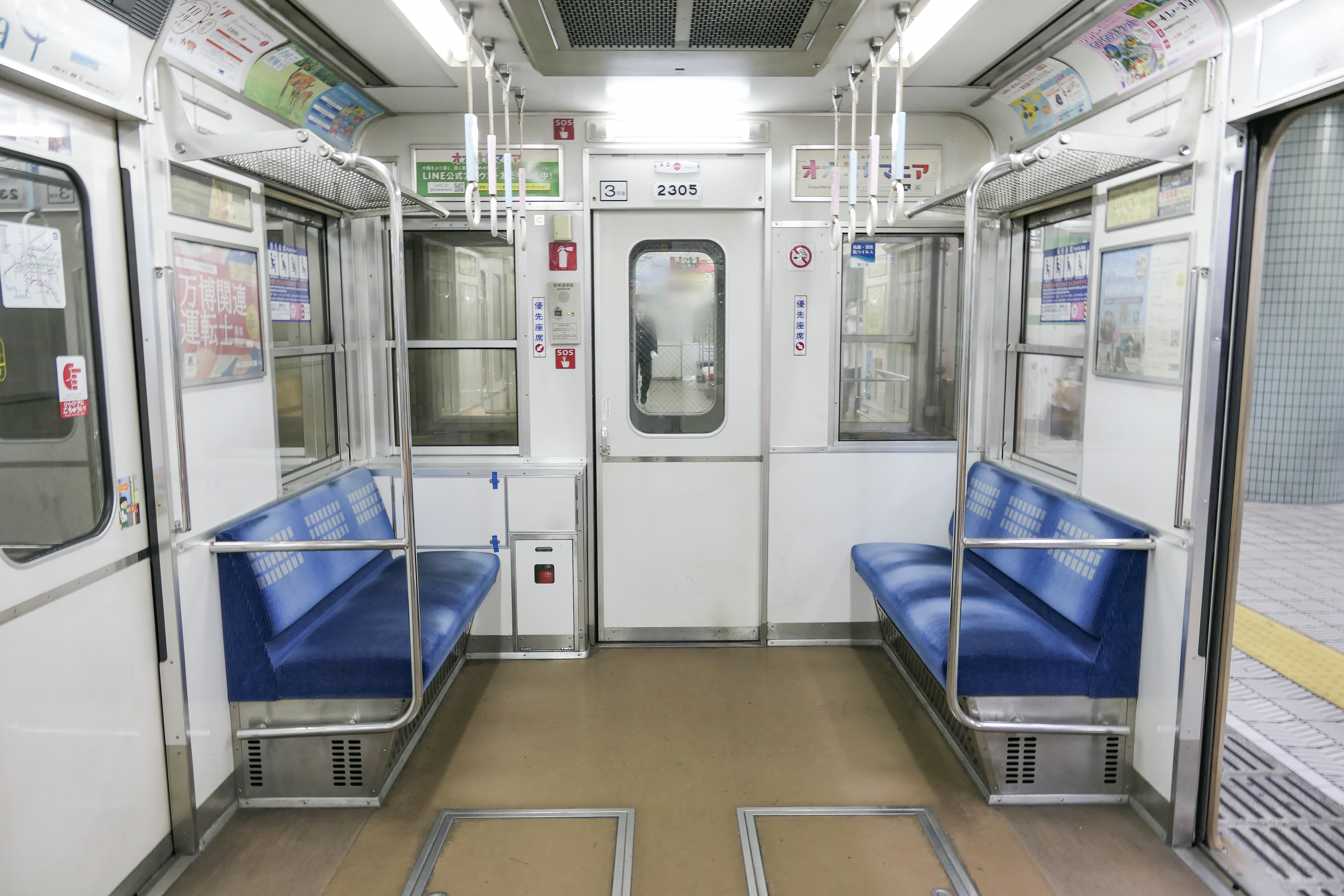
Priority seating of a 20 series car
