= Osaka Municipal Subway 10 series =

Japanese electric multiple unit train type

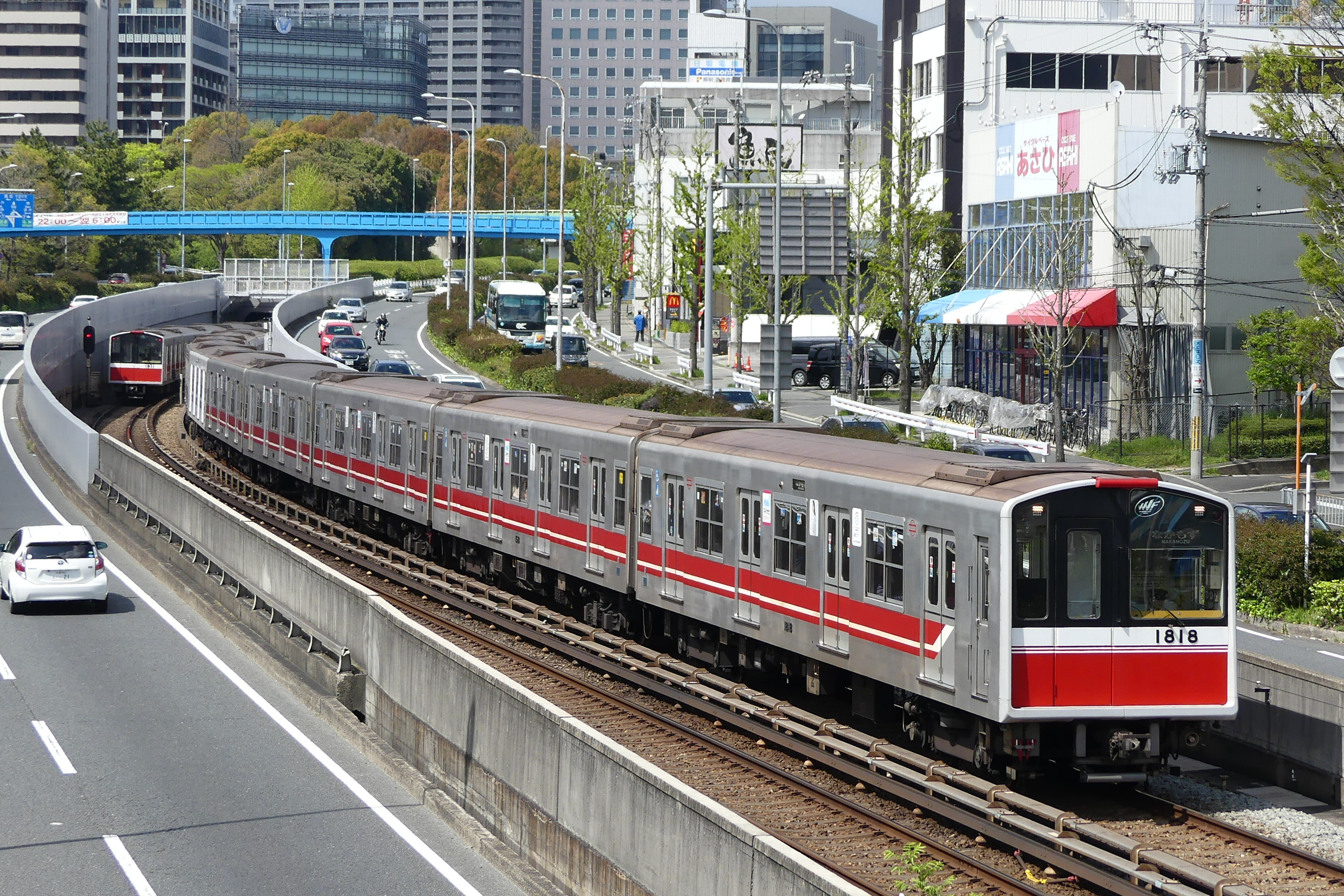
- A 10A series trainset on the Kita-Osaka Kyuko Railway
- In service: 1976–2022
- Manufacturer: Alna Kōki, Kawasaki Heavy Industries, Kinki Sharyo, Nippon Sharyo, Tokyu Car Corporation
- Entered service: 16 February 1976
- Refurbished: 1998
- Number built: 234 cars (26 sets)
- Number in service: None
- Number preserved: 1 vehicle (cab end only)
- Successor: 30000 series
- Formation: 10 cars per trainset
- Operators: Osaka Metro
- Lines served: Midōsuji Line; Kitakyu Namboku Line

Specifications
- Doors: 4 per side
- Traction motors: Chopper control VVVF (1117–1126)

The Osaka Municipal Subway/Osaka Metro 10 series (大阪市交通局・大阪メトロ10系) was a rapid transit electric multiple unit (EMU) train type operated by Osaka Municipal Subway in Japan between 1976 and 2022.

== Design ==
Originally introduced to the Midosuji Line as 8-car sets, trains were lengthened to 9 cars by 1987, and eventually 10 cars by 1995.

== Refurbishment ==
Refurbishment of the 10 series trainsets began in 1998. Ten trainsets were upgraded to use variable-frequency drive (VFD) technology, increasing efficiency.

== Interior ==
The 10 series were among the first trains powered by a third rail to be equipped with an air conditioning system.

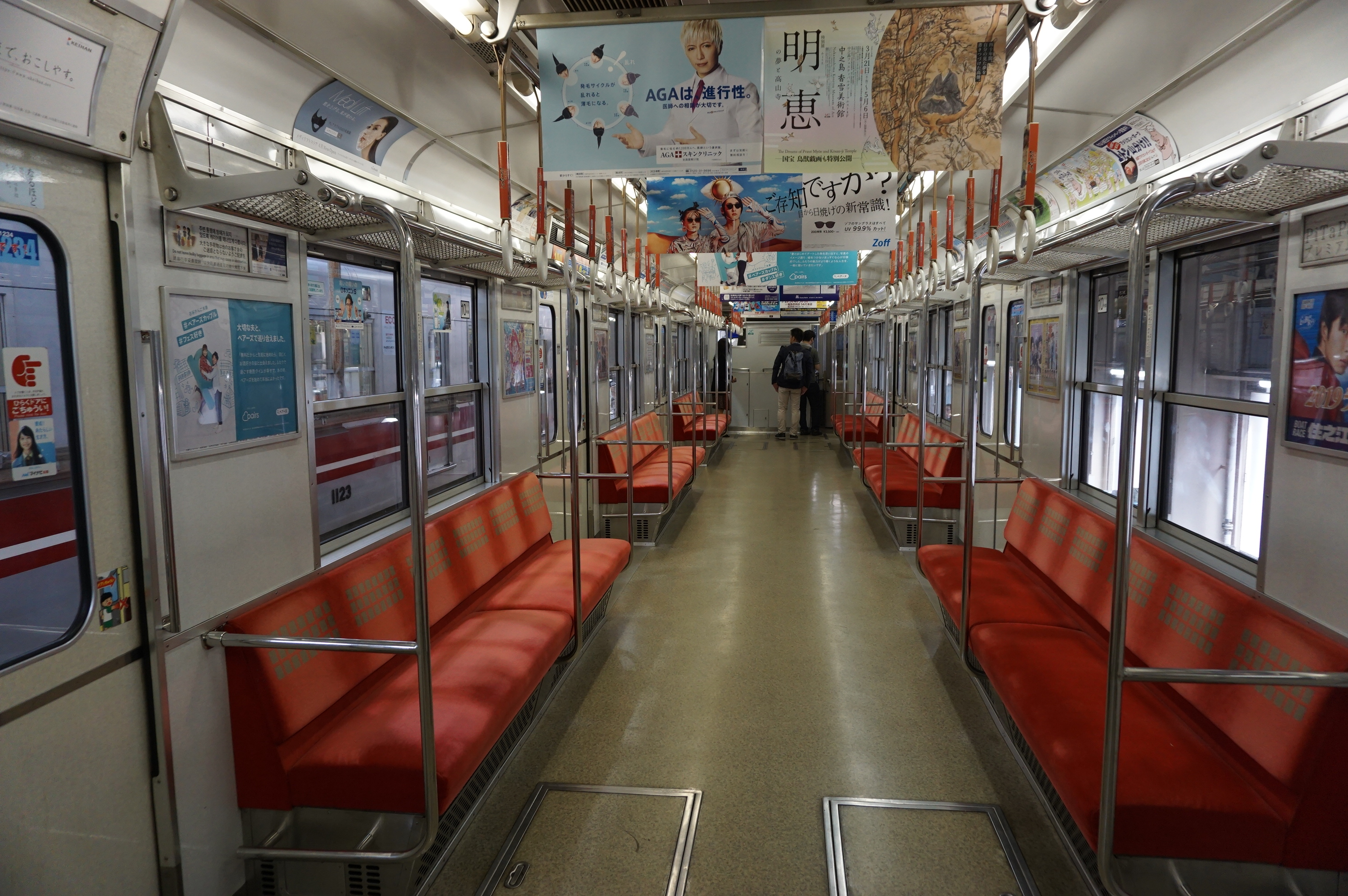
Inside a 10 series car

== History ==
The 10 series were the main rolling stock on the Midōsuji Line since 1976.

By 1989, the fleet had reached 234 cars, including the prototype cars that initially operated on the Tanimachi Line.

Retirement of the 10 series began with the introduction of 30000 series trainsets on the Midōsuji Line in 2011. The last trainset retaining its original chopper motors (1113) was retired on 9 July 2020. As of June 2022, one trainset remained in operation. The remaining trainset (1126) was withdrawn from service in July 2022.
