= Osaka Municipal Subway 30000 series =

Japanese train type

Osaka Municipal Subway/Osaka Metro 30000 series
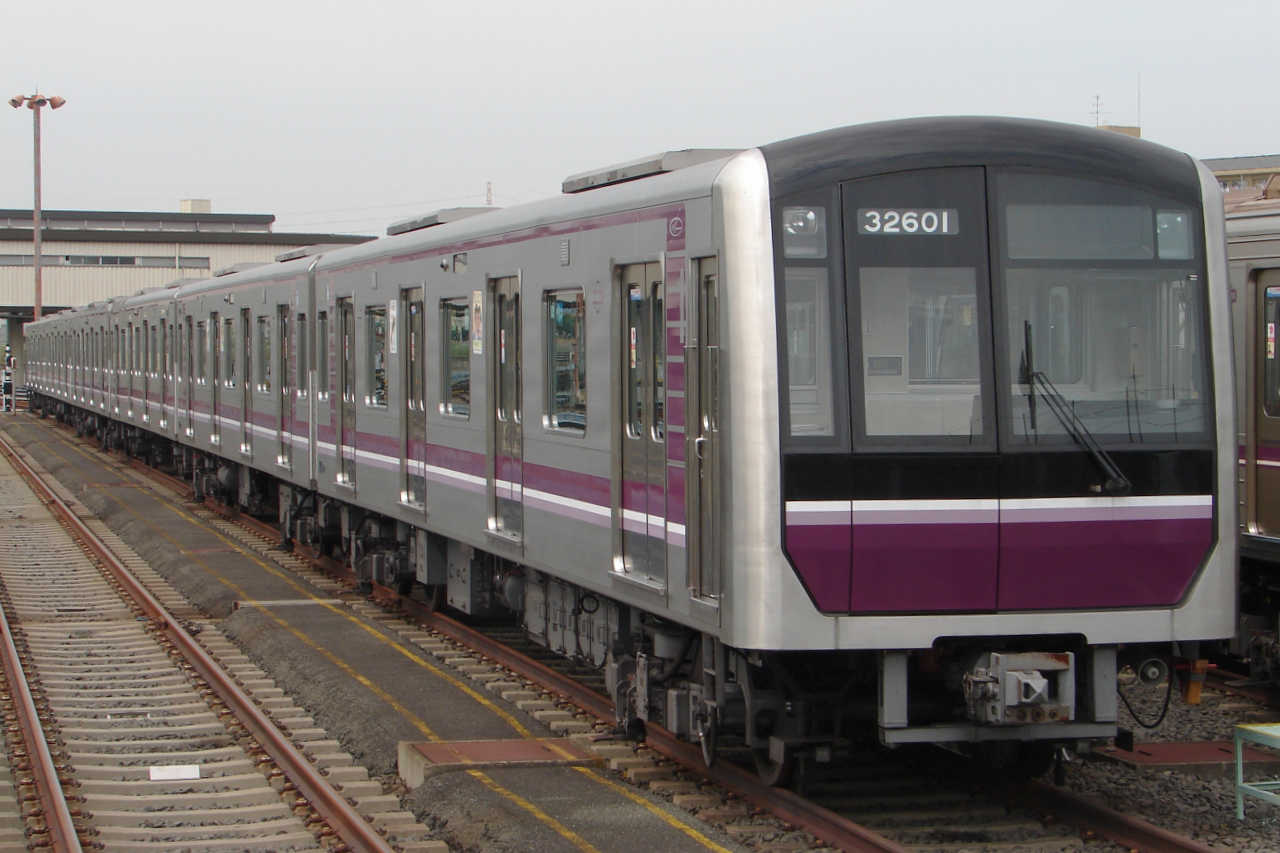
- Tanimachi Line set 32601 at Yao Depot (Sept. 2009)
- In service: 2009 – present
- Manufacturer: Kawasaki Heavy Industries, Kinki Sharyo
- Family name: Kawasaki efACE
- Replaced: 30 series, 10/10A series
- Constructed: 2008–2023
- Entered service: 18 March 2009
- Number built: 358 vehicles (45 sets)
- Number in service: 358 vehicles (45 sets)
- Formation: 6/10 cars per trainset
- Operators: Osaka Municipal Transportation Bureau (2009–2018); Osaka Metro (2018–)
- Lines served: Tanimachi Line, Midōsuji Line, Kitakyu Namboku Line

Specifications
- Car body construction: Stainless steel
- Train length: 112.6 m (369 ft 5 in) (32000); 180.4 m (591 ft 10 in) (31000)
- Car length: 18.7 m (61 ft 4 in) (32000 intermediate cars); 18.9 m (62 ft) (32000 end cars); 18 m (59 ft 1 in) (31000 intermediate cars); 18.2 m (59 ft 9 in) (31000 end cars)
- Width: 2.89 m (9 ft 6 in) (32000); 2.8 m (9 ft 2 in) (31000)
- Height: 3.735 m (12 ft 3 in) (intermediate cars); 3.745 m (12 ft 3.4 in) (end cars)
- Doors: 4 pairs per side
- Maximum speed: 70 km/h (43 mph)
- Traction system: Variable-frequency
- Traction motors: Four 140 kW (188 hp) traction motors per motor car
- Power output: 560 kW (751 hp) per motor car
- Acceleration: 2.5 km/(h⋅s) (1.6 mph/s) (32000); 2.8 km/(h⋅s) (1.7 mph/s) (31000)
- Deceleration: 3.5 km/(h⋅s) (2.2 mph/s) (service); 4.5 km/(h⋅s) (2.8 mph/s) (emergency)
- Electric system(s): 750 V DC
- Current collection: Third rail contact shoes
- Braking system(s): Electronically controlled brake with regenerative braking
- Safety system(s): WS-ATC; TASC (Midōsuji Line only)
- Coupling system: Shibata
- Track gauge: 1,435 mm (4 ft 8 1/2 in) standard gauge

The Osaka Municipal Subway/Osaka Metro 30000 series (大阪市交通局・大阪メトロ30000系) is a rapid transit electric multiple unit (EMU) train type operated by Osaka Municipal Subway (now Osaka Metro) in Japan since 2009.

== Design ==
Thirteen six-car sets were built based on the New 20 series design to replace the older 30 series sets on the Tanimachi Line.

A total of 12 ten-car 30000 series sets are also on order for use on the Midōsuji Line, with the first set entering service on 10 December 2011, replacing the older 10 series sets. These 30000 series sets were the final new subway rolling stock to be ordered by the Osaka Municipal Transportation Bureau before it was privatised in 2018.

== Formations ==
=== 6-car sets ===
As of 1 April 2016, the Tanimachi Line fleet consists of 23 six-car trainsets (thirteen 30000 series and ten 30000A series) and are formed as follows, with car 1 at the Yao-Minami end.

Car No.	1	2	3	4	5	6
Designation	Tec1	Mb1'	T'	Mb2	Ma2	Tec2
Numbering	326xx	321xx	328xx	323xx	322xx	329xx

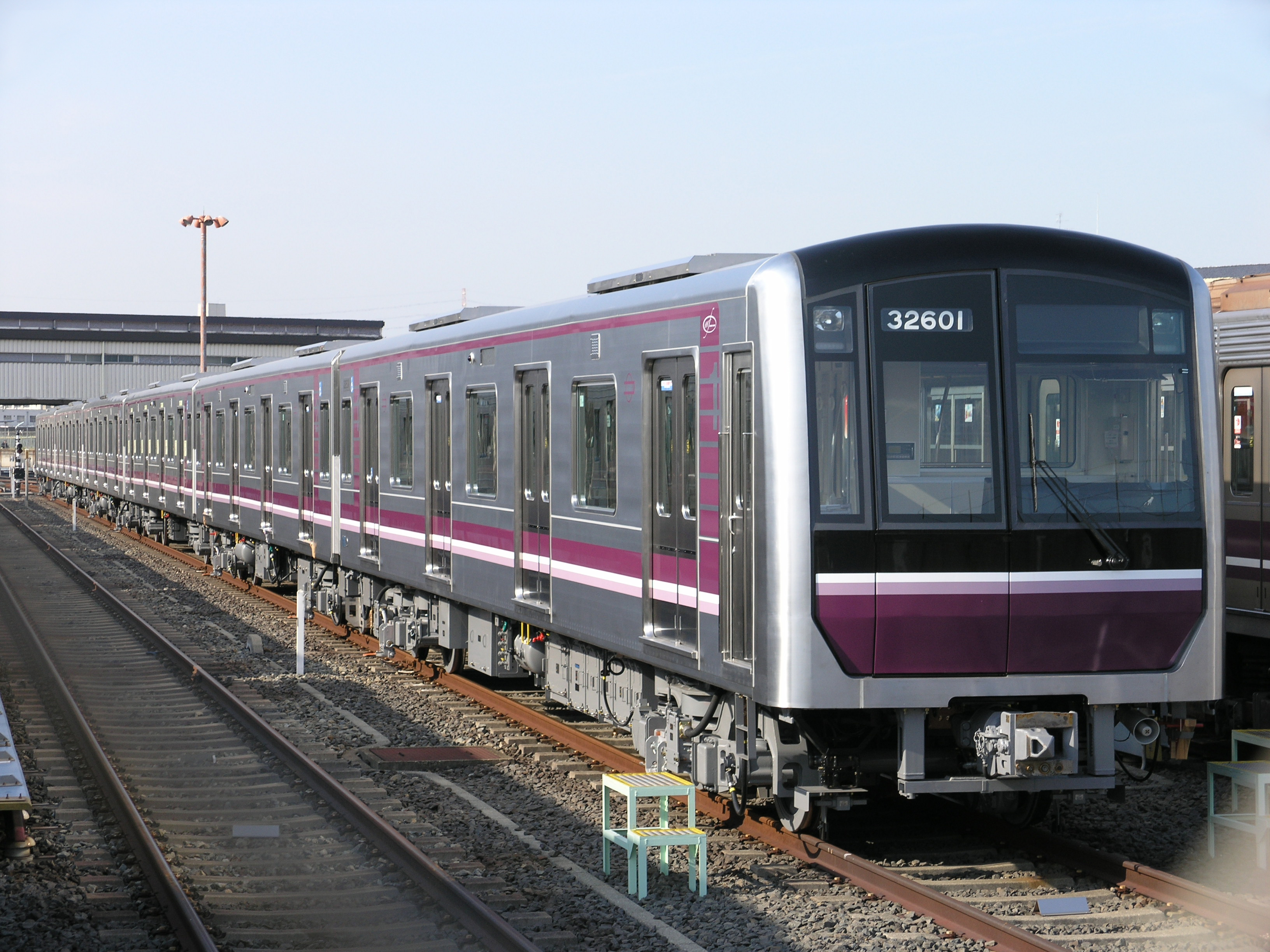
Tanimachi Line set 32601 at Yao Depot (December 2008)

Car 3 is designated as a women-only car (rush hour only).

=== 10-car sets ===
As of 1 April 2025, the Midōsuji Line fleet consists of 22 ten-car trainsets and are formed as follows, with car 1 at the Nakamozu end.

Car No.	1	2	3	4	5	6	7	8	9	10
Designation	Tec2	Ma2	Mb2	T	T'	Mb1'	Te	Mb1	Ma1	Tec1
Numbering	319xx	312xx	313xx	315xx	318xx	314xx	317xx	311xx	310xx	316xx

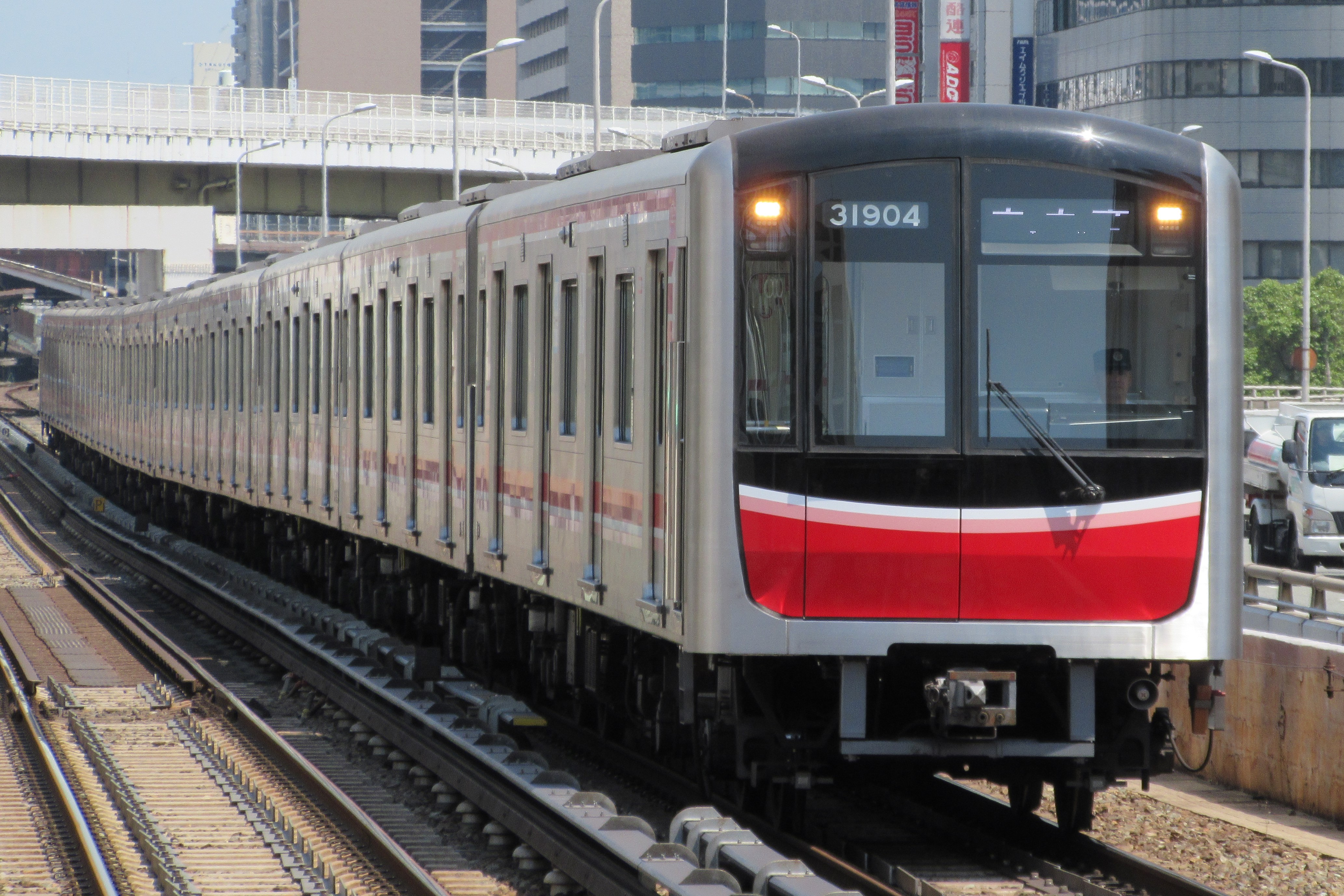
10-car Midōsuji Line set 31904 (May 2017)

Car 6 is designated as a women-only car (weekdays only).

== Interior ==
Midosuji Line sets from 31604 onward incorporate a number of design improvements, including new seat covers, LED lighting, and pairs of wide-screen LCD passenger information displays above the doorways.

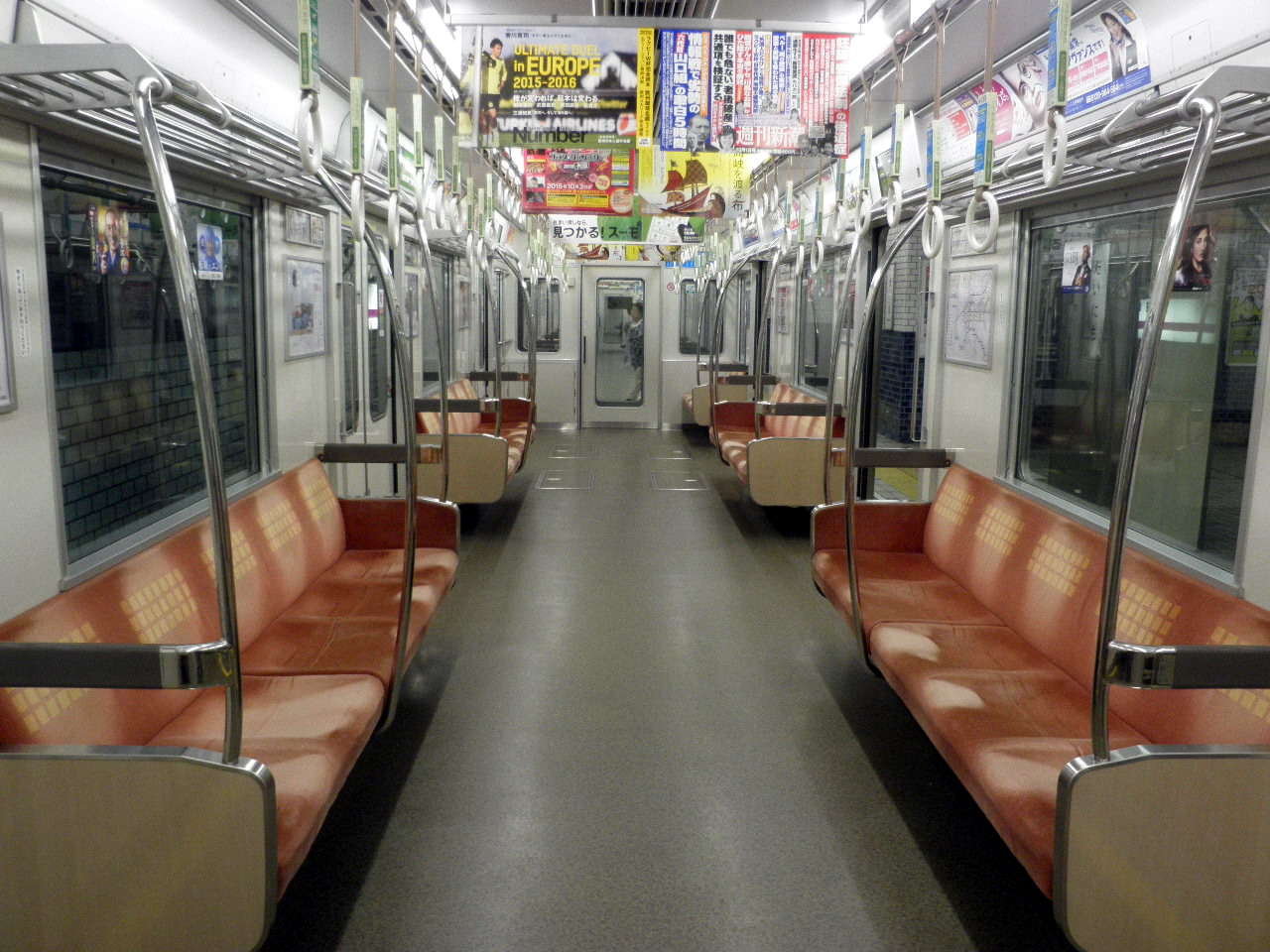
Tanimachi Line set car interior (September 2015)

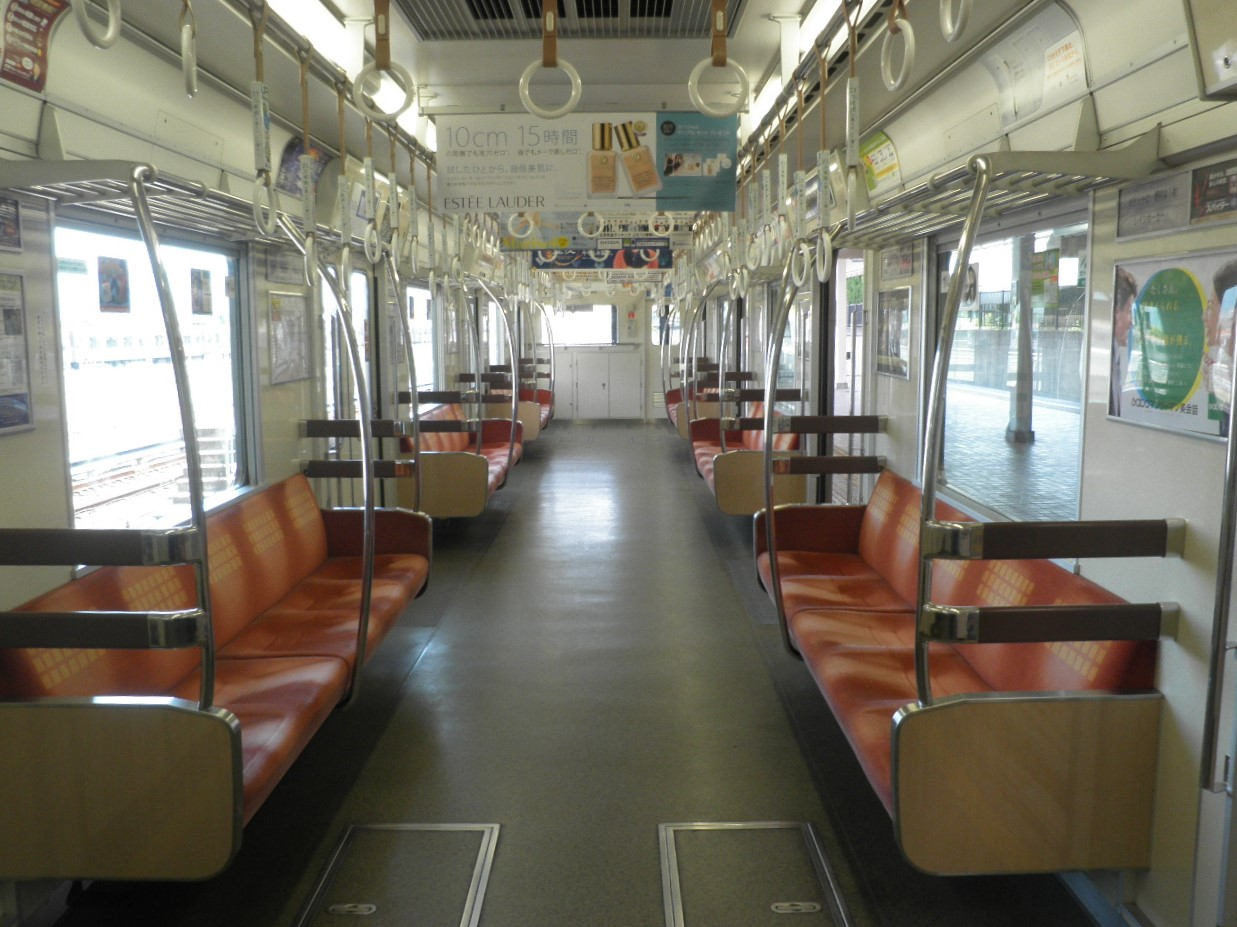
Tanimachi Line set car 32610 interior (May 2016)

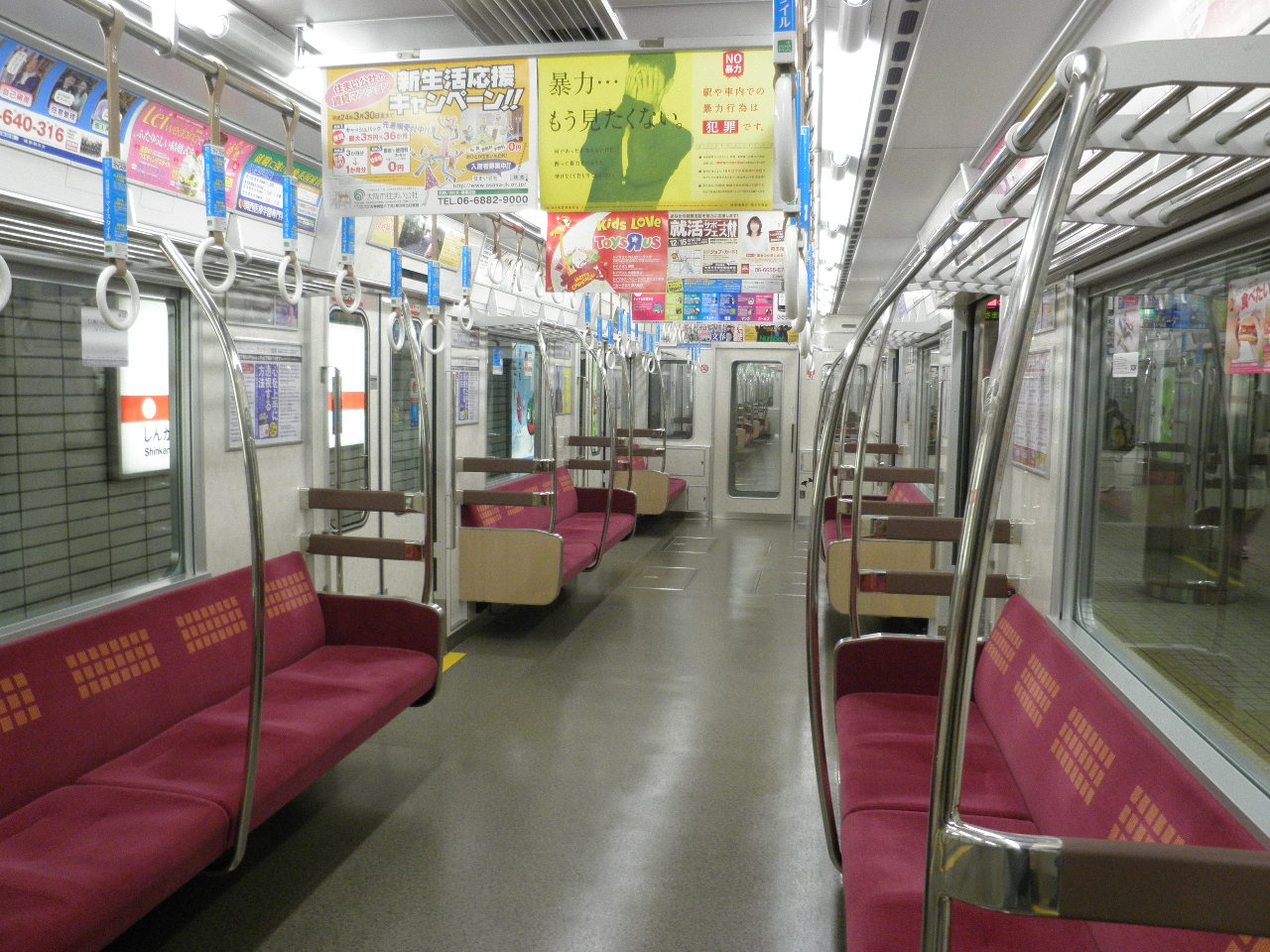
Midosuji Line set car interior (December 2011)

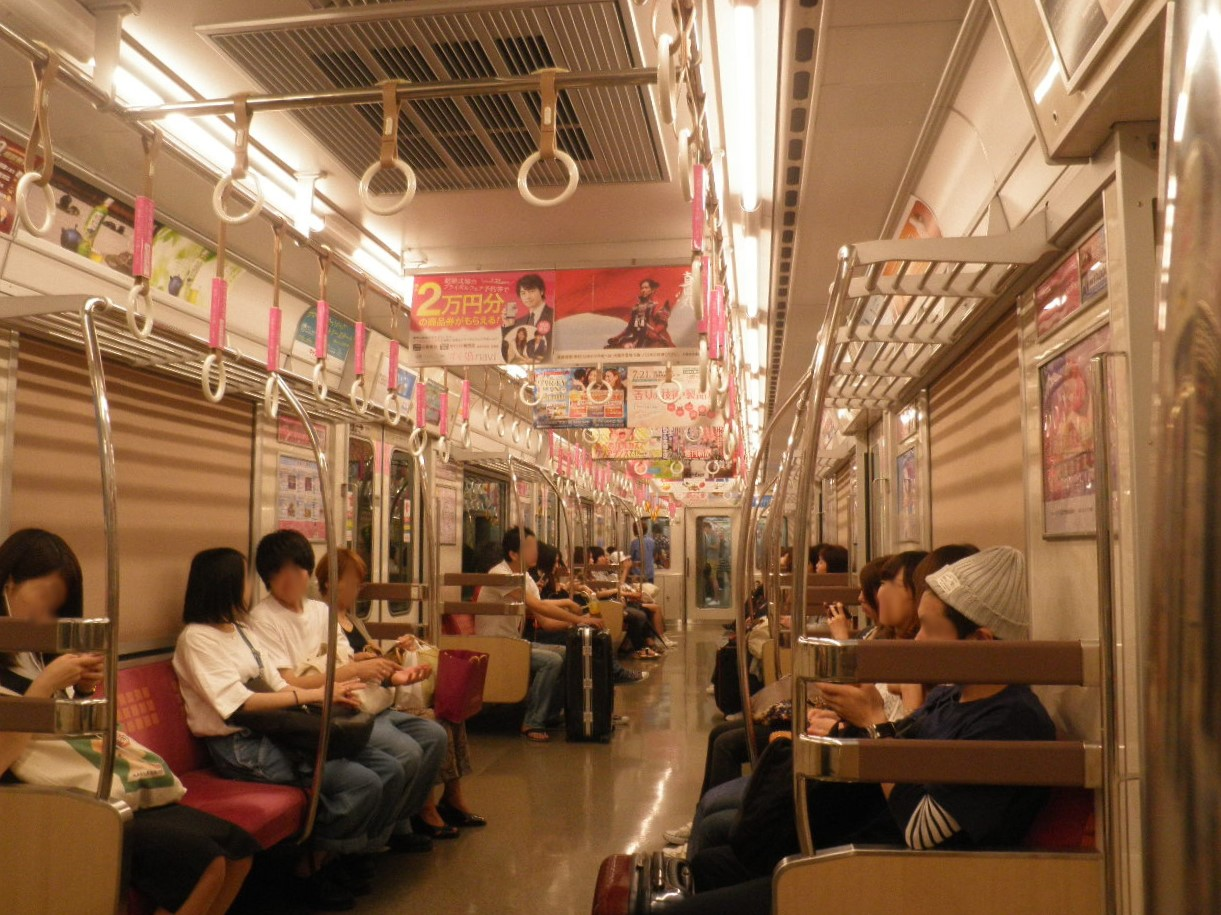
Midosuji Line set women-only car (car 6) interior (July 2016)

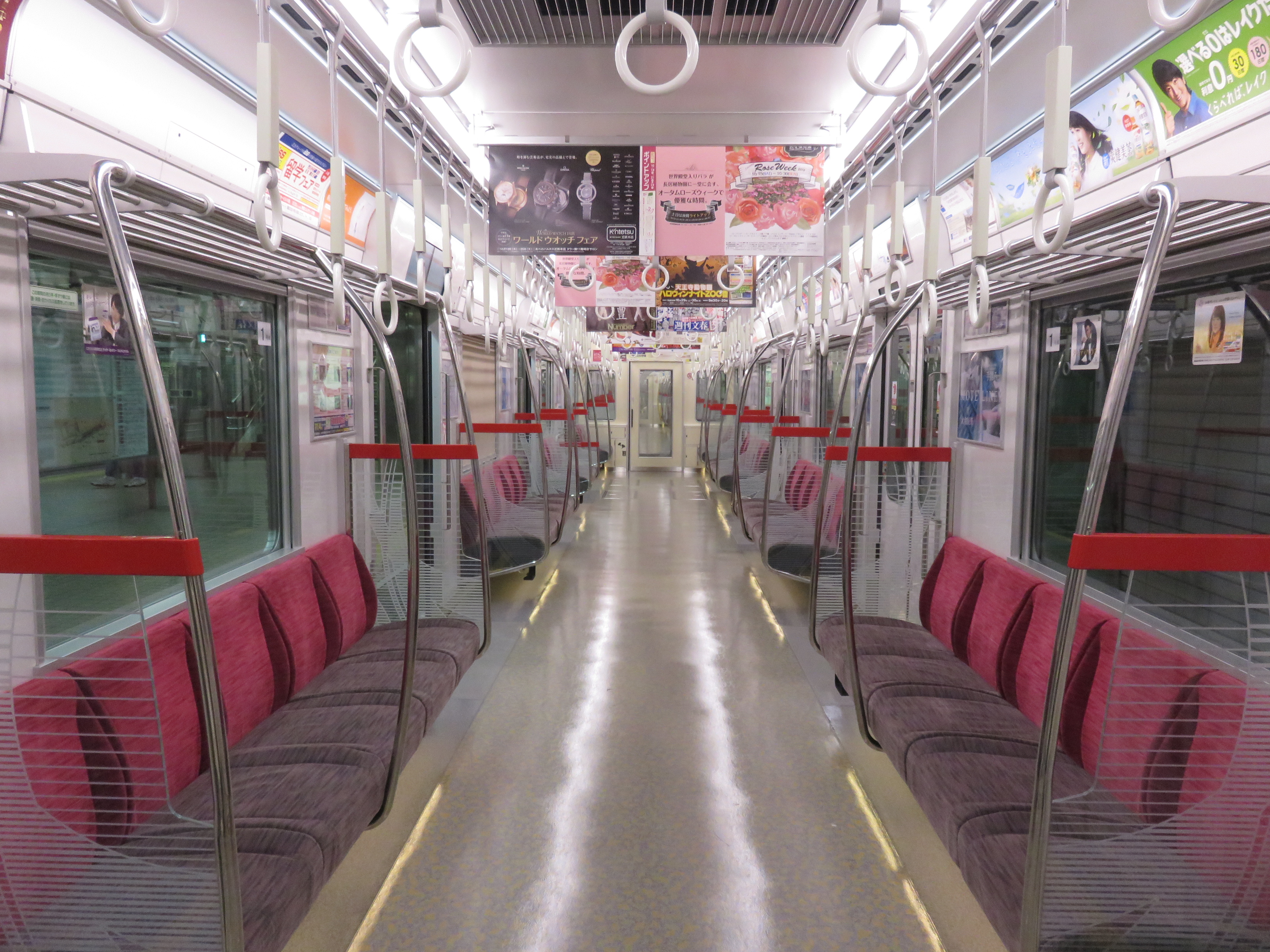
Midosuji Line set car 31604 interior (October 2016)

== History ==
The first Tanimachi Line set was unveiled in October 2008 and entered service on 18 March 2009.

=== 30000A series ===
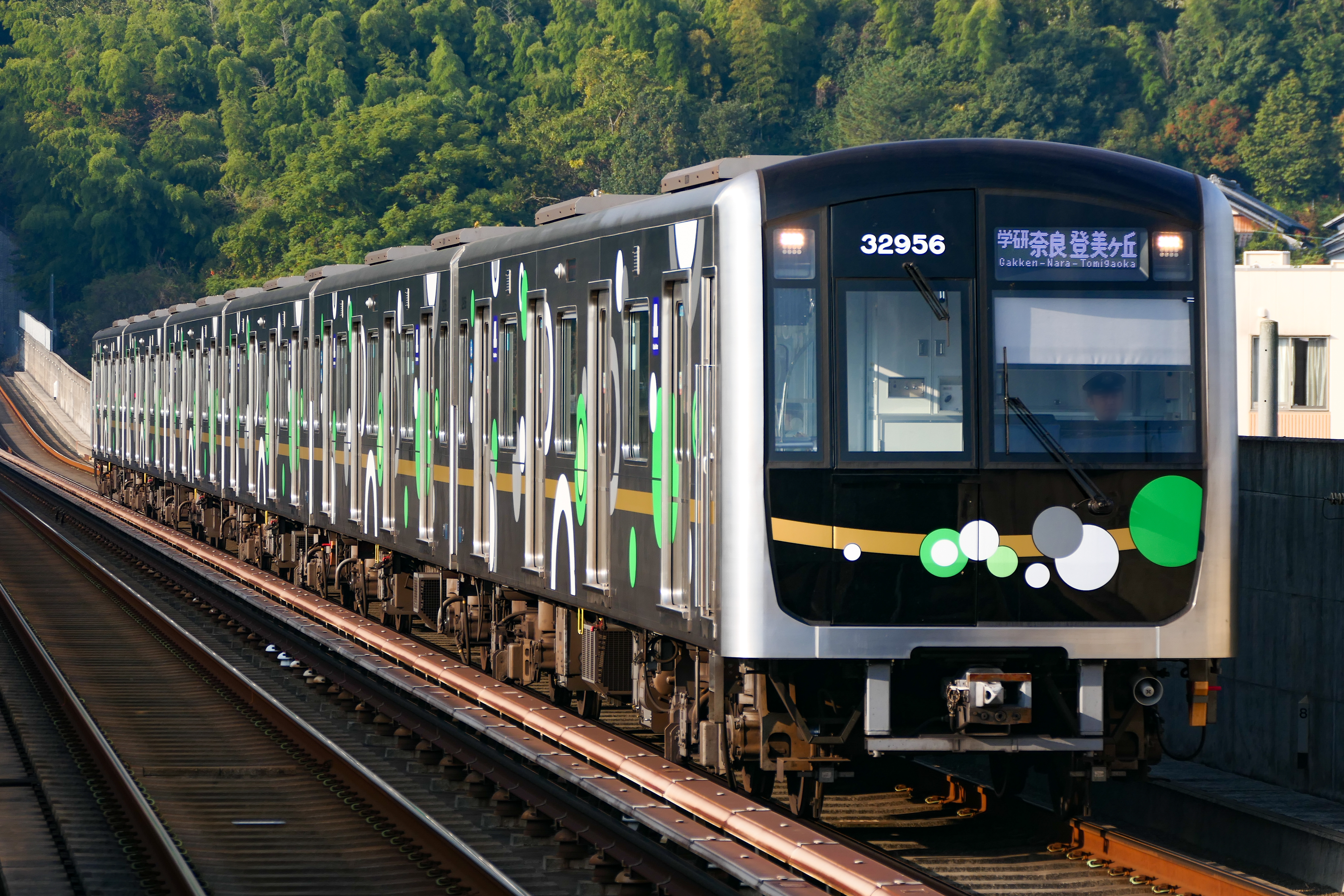
Chūō Line 30000A series trainset (November 2023)

An improved derivative of the 30000 series, the 30000A series, was first announced by Osaka Metro on 9 December 2021. Changes from the 30000 series include a lower center of gravity, yellow-and-turquoise seat moquette, improved accessibility, and onboard air purifiers. A total of ten 6-car 30000A series sets were ordered.

The fleet began operation in July 2022 on Osaka Metro Chūō Line and Kintetsu Keihanna Line through services. Following Expo 2025, the fleet was gradually transferred to the Tanimachi Line.

== Fleet history ==
The build history for the fleet is as shown below.

Set No.	Manufacturer	Date delivered
31601	?	?
31602	Kawasaki Heavy Industries	16 December 2013
31603	Kawasaki Heavy Industries	10 April 2014
31604	Kawasaki Heavy Industries	
32601	?	?
32602	?	?
32603	?	?
32604	?	?
32605	?	?
32606	?	?
32607	?	?
32608	Kinki Sharyo	2 October 2012
32609	Kinki Sharyo	14 December 2012
32610	Kinki Sharyo	12 February 2013
32611	Kinki Sharyo	4 June 2013
32612	Kinki Sharyo	12 August 2013
32613	Kinki Sharyo	17 September 2013
