= Osaka Municipal Subway New 20 series =

Japanese train type

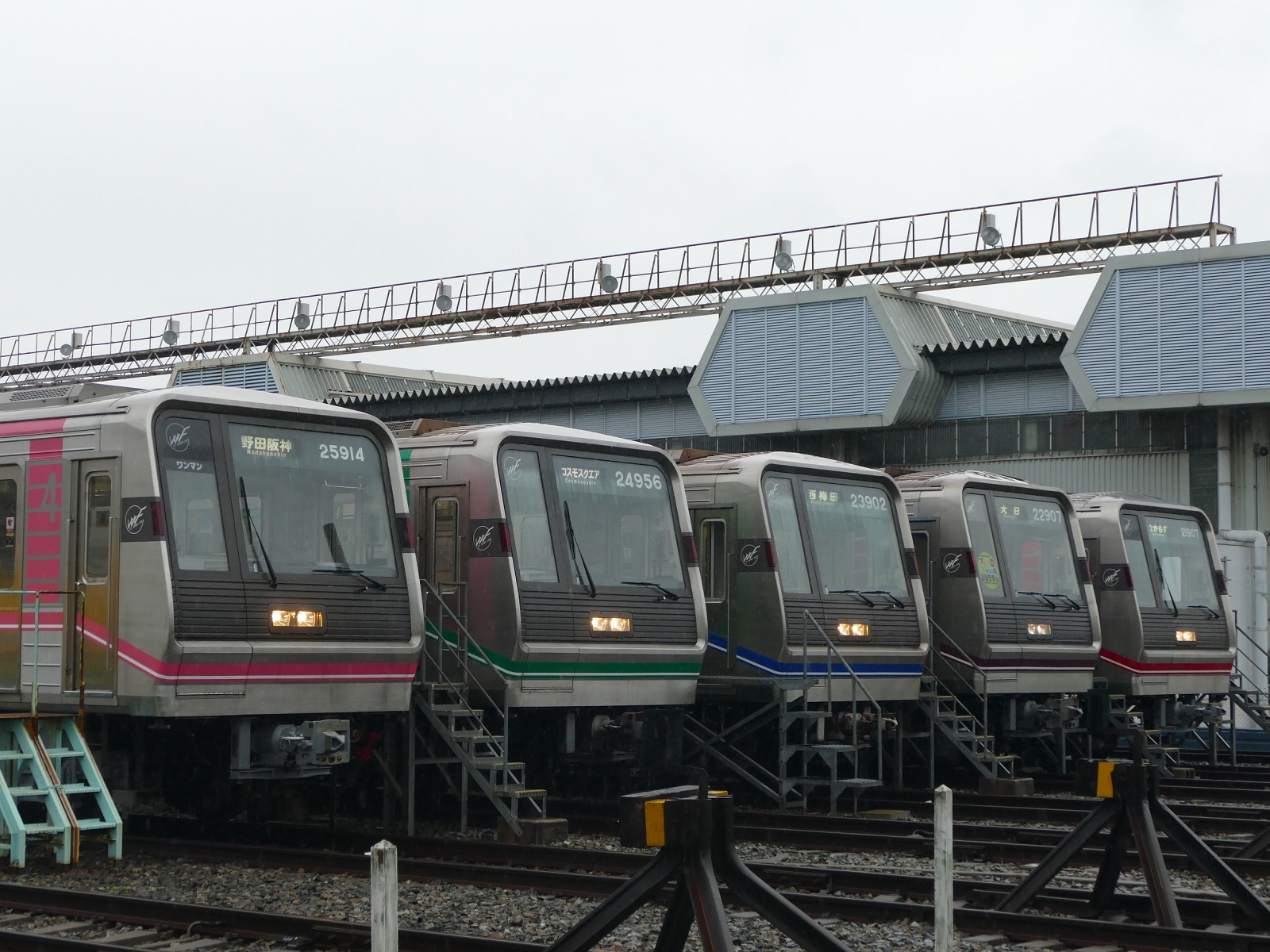
- A line-up of the five different 20 series variants at Midorigi Depot in November 2016
- In service: 1990–present
- Manufacturer: Alna Kōki, Hitachi Rail Japan, Kawasaki Heavy Industries, Kinki Sharyo, Nippon Sharyo, Tokyu Car Corporation
- Replaced: 30 series, 50 series
- Constructed: 1990–1998
- Entered service: 25 April 1990
- Refurbished: 2011–
- Number built: 572 vehicles
- Number in service: 572 vehicles
- Formation: 10 cars per trainset (21 series); 6 cars per trainset (22/23/24/OTS series); 4 cars per trainset (25 series)
- Operators: Osaka Municipal Transportation Bureau (1990–2018); Osaka Metro (2018–present)
- Depots: Nakamozu (21 series); Dainichi, Yao (22 series); Midorigi (21/22/23/24/25 series); Morinomiya (24/25/OTS series)
- Lines served: Midōsuji Line; Tanimachi Line; Yotsubashi Line; Chūō Line; Sennichimae Line; Kitakyū Namboku Line; Kintetsu Keihanna Line

Specifications
- Car body construction: Stainless steel
- Train length: 187.4 m (614 ft 10 in) (21 series); 112.6 m (369 ft 5 in) (22/23/24/OTS series); 75.2 m (246 ft 9 in) (25 series)
- Car length: 18.9 m (62 ft 0 in) (end cars); 18.7 m (61 ft 4 in) (intermediate cars)
- Width: 2.89 m (9 ft 6 in) (end cars); 2.88 m (9 ft 5 in) (intermediate cars)
- Height: 3,745 mm (12 ft 3 in)
- Doors: 4 pairs of sliding doors per side
- Maximum speed: 95 km/h (59 mph) (24 series; Kintetsu Keihanna Line); 70 km/h (43 mph) (other series)
- Traction system: Variable-frequency
- Traction motors: Four 140 kW (188 hp) traction motors per motor car
- Power output: 560 kW (751 hp) per motor car
- Acceleration: 3.0 km/(h⋅s) (1.9 mph/s) (21/24 series); 2.5 km/(h⋅s) (1.6 mph/s) (other series)
- Deceleration: 3.5 km/(h⋅s) (2.2 mph/s); 4.5 km/(h⋅s) (2.8 mph/s) (emergency)
- Electric system(s): 750 V DC
- Current collector(s): Third rail contact shoes
- Braking system(s): Electric commanding brake with regenerative brake
- Safety system(s): WS-ATC (21/22/23/24/OTS series); WS-ATC, CS-ATC, ATO (25 series) TASC (21/24 series)
- Track gauge: 1,435 mm (4 ft 8 1/2 in)

The Osaka Municipal Subway New 20 series (大阪市交通局新20系) is a rapid transit electric multiple unit (EMU) train type operated by Osaka Municipal Subway in Japan since 1990.

== Variants ==
The New 20 series was developed from the earlier 20 series trains introduced on the Chūō Line from 1984.

- 21 series: 10-car sets used on the Midōsuji Line and the Kita-Osaka Kyuko Railway Namboku Line
- 22 series: 6-car sets used on the Tanimachi Line
- 23 series: 6-car sets used on the Yotsubashi Line
- 24 series: 6-car sets used on the Chūō Line and the Kintetsu Keihanna Line
- 25 series: 4-car sets used on the Sennichimae Line
- OTS series (OTS系): 6-car sets introduced in 1997 on the opening of the Cosmosquare to Osakakō segment of the Chūō Line and owned by Osaka Port Transport System (OTS), transferred to Tanimachi Line in 2006 and reclassified as 22-50 series
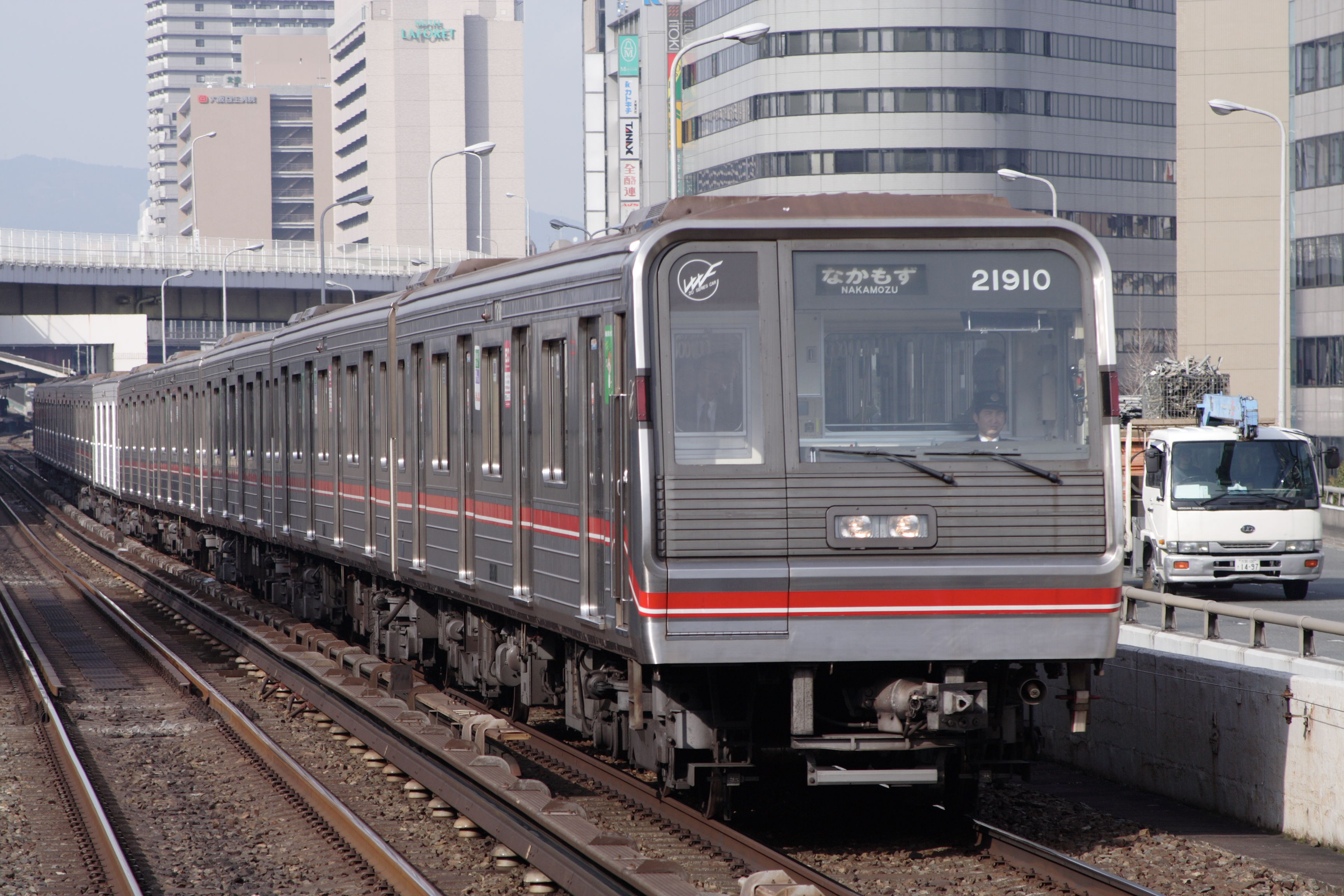
A 21 series set in February 2006

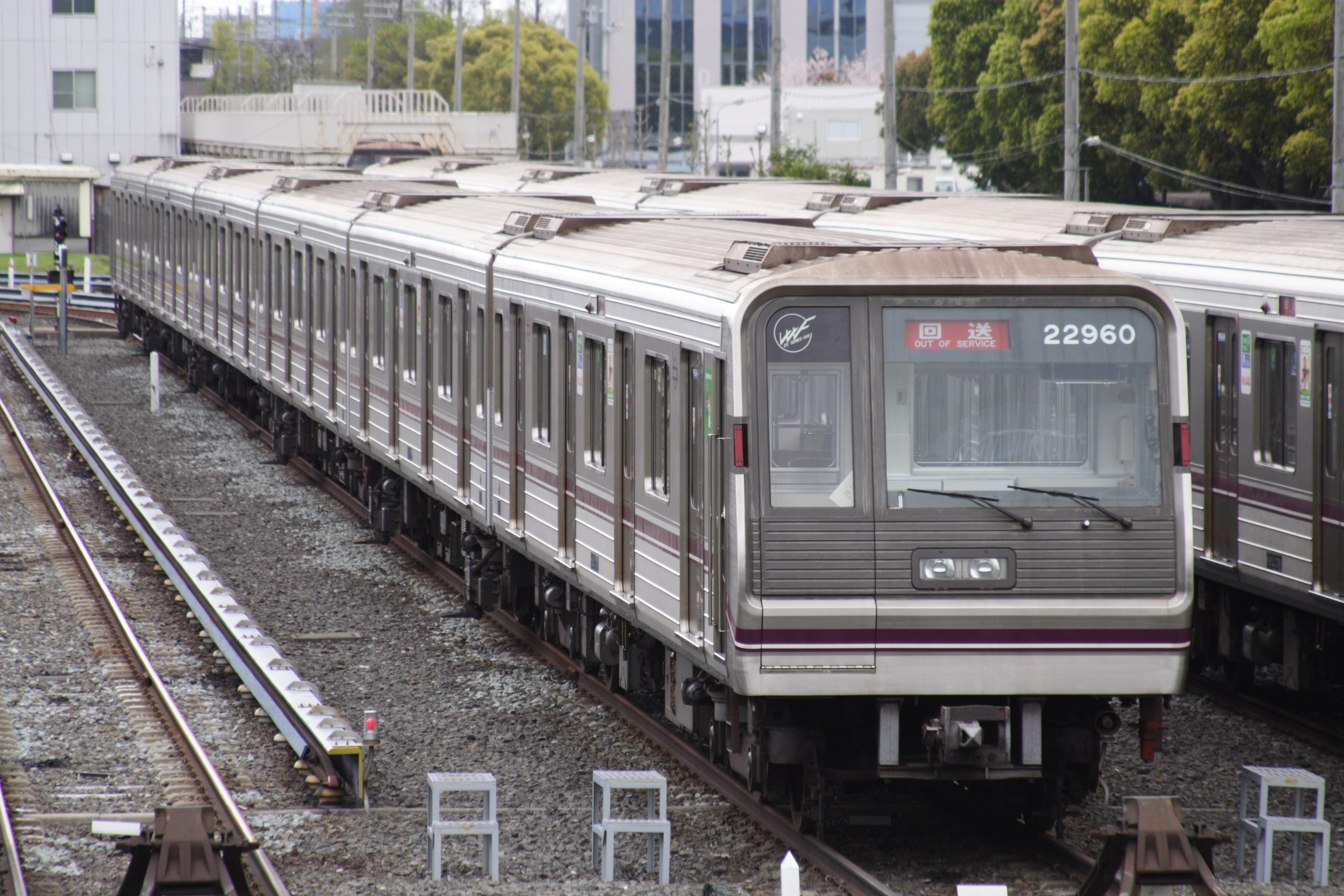
A 22 series set in April 2006

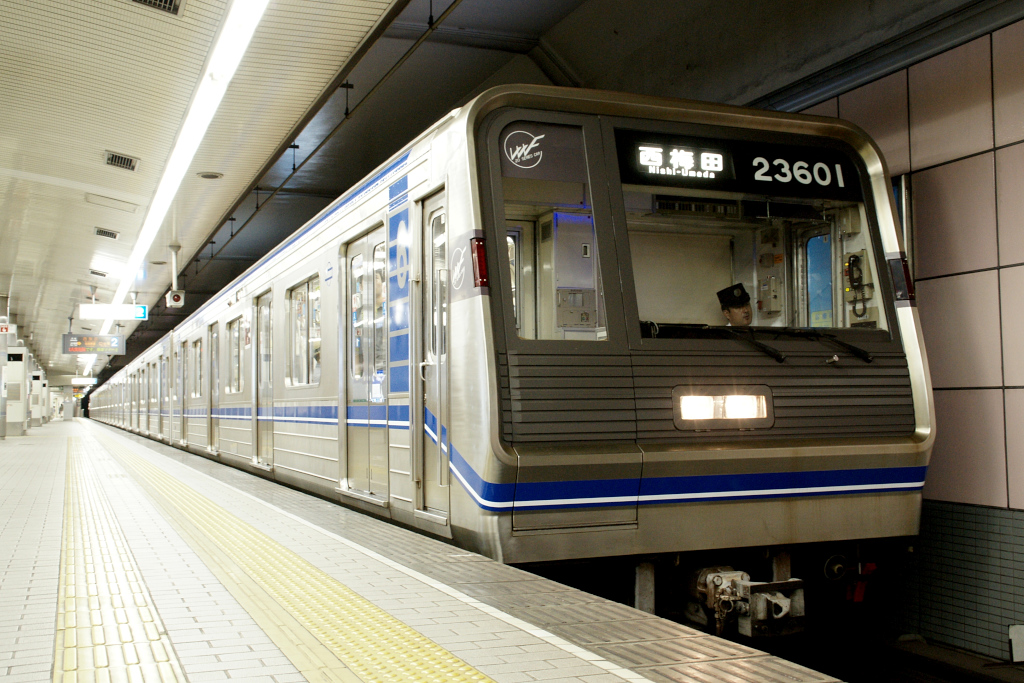
A refurbished 23 series set in August 2012

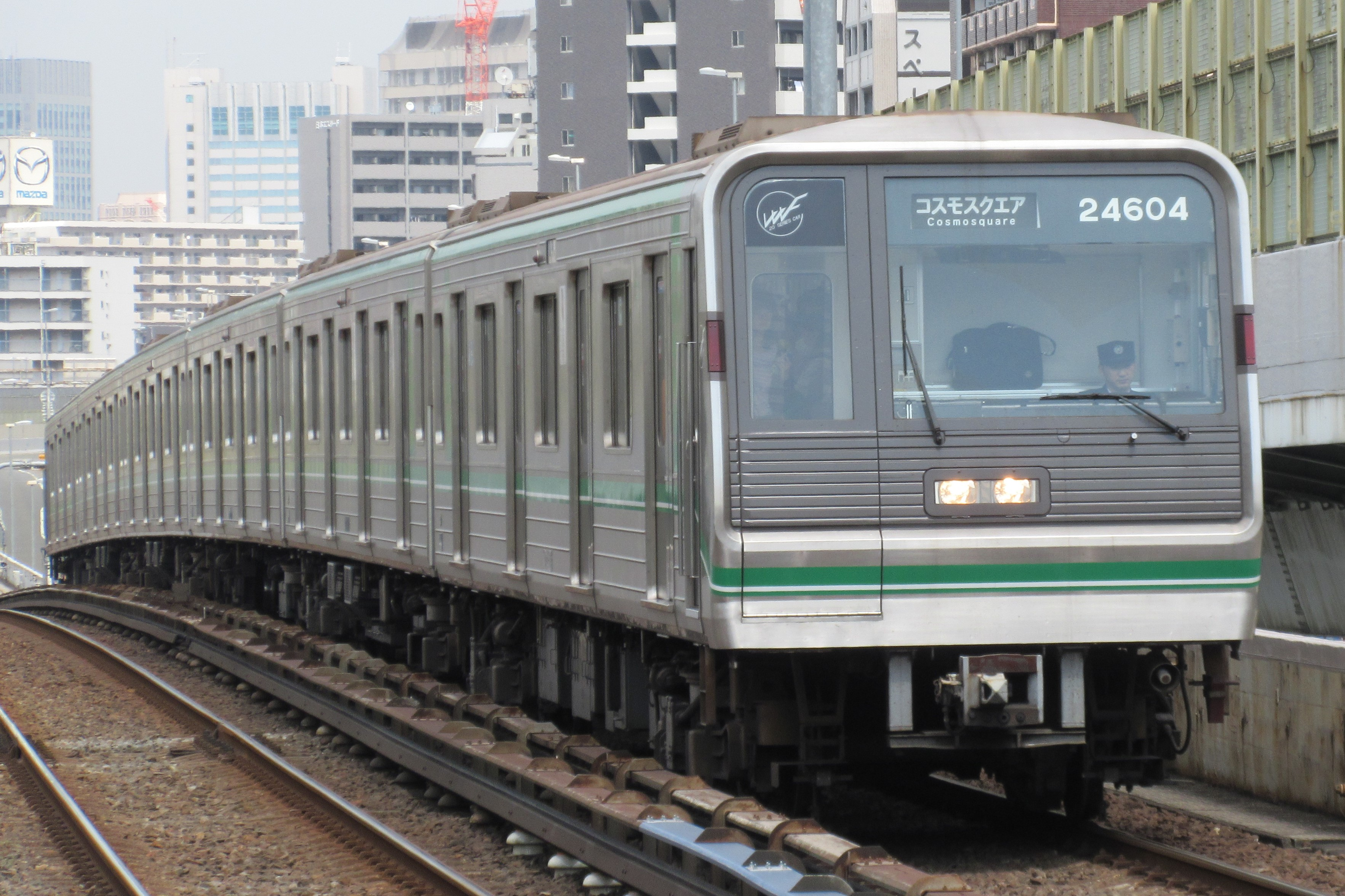
A refurbished 24 series set in April 2017

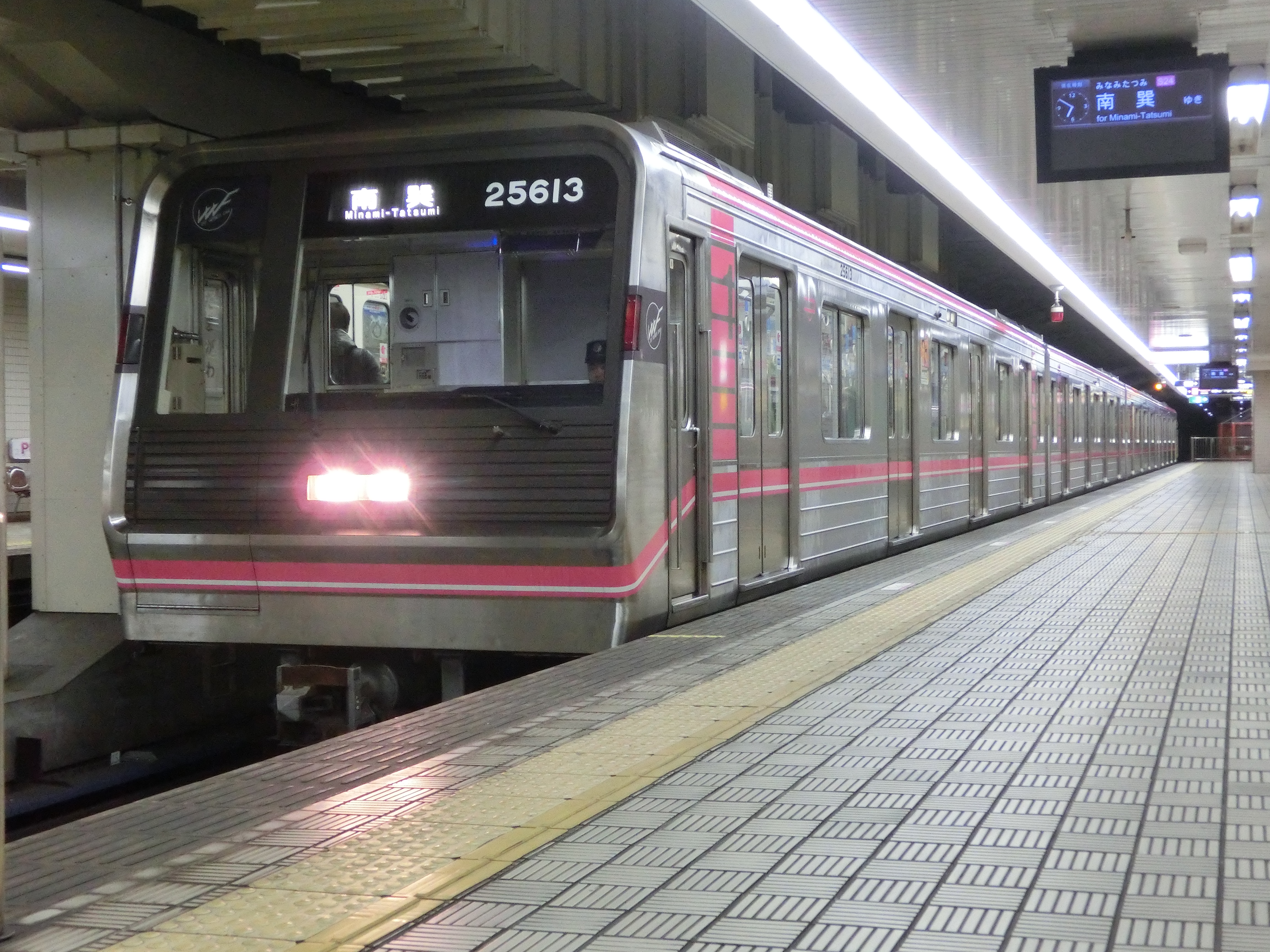
A refurbished 25 series set in February 2014

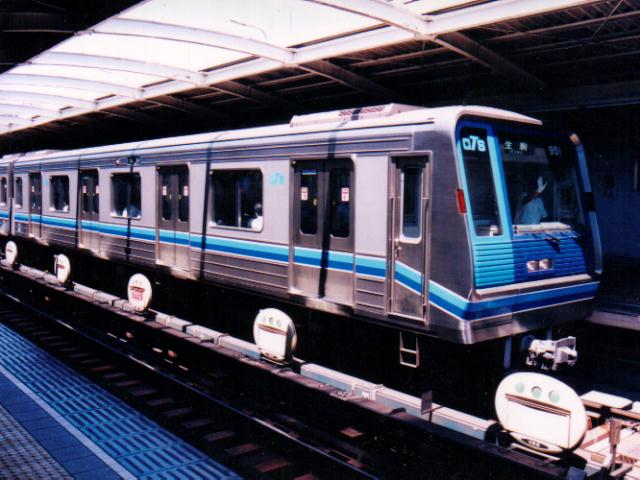
An OTS series set in July 2002

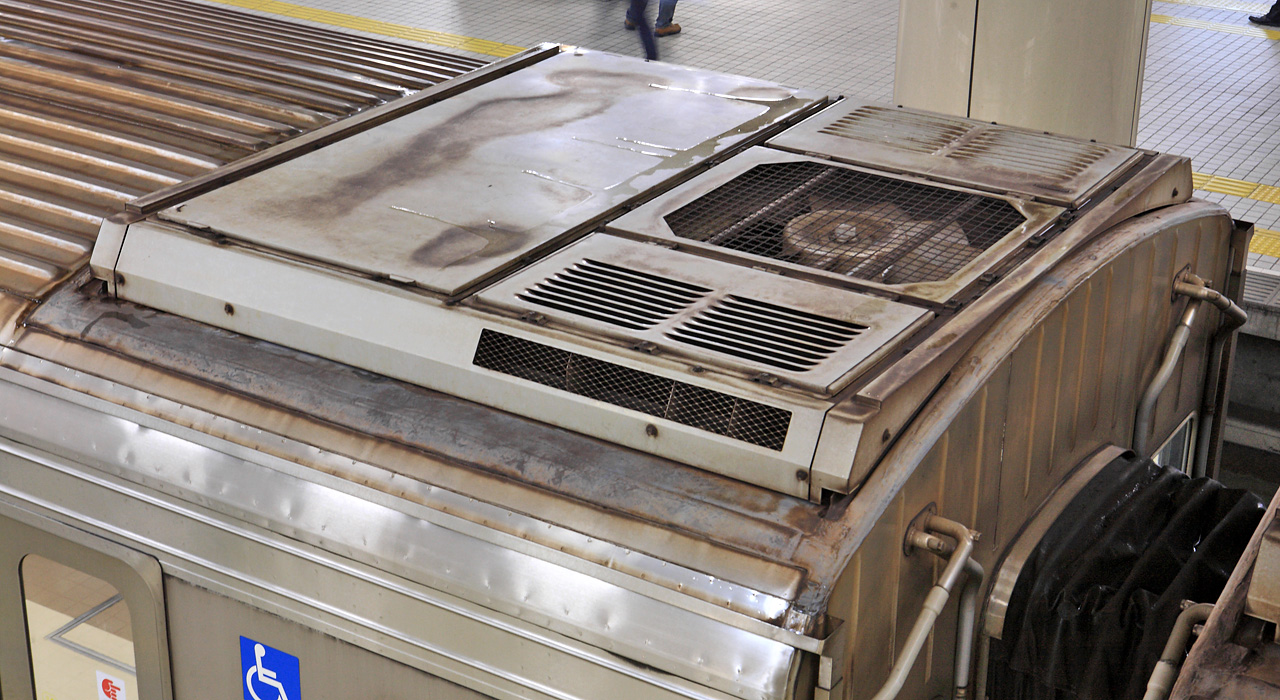
21 series rooftop AC condenser unit

== Formation ==
Trains are formed as follows.

=== 21 series ===
Car No.	1	2	3	4	5	6	7	8	9	10
Designation	Tec2	Ma2	Mb2	T	T'	Ma1'	Tbp	Mb1	Ma1	Tec1
Numbering	219xx	212xx	213xx	215xx	218xx	214xx	217xx	211xx	210xx	216xx

Car 6 is designated as a women-only car (Weekday only).

=== 22/23/24/OTS series ===
Car No.	1	2	3	4	5	6
Designation	Tec1	Mb1'	T'	Mb2	Ma2	Tec2
Numbering	2600	2100	2800	2300	2200	2900

22 series car 3 is designated as a women-only car (Rush hour only).

=== 25 series ===
Car No.	1	2	3	4
Designation	Tec1	Mb1'	Mb2	Tec2
Numbering	256xx	251xx	253xx	259xx
