= Bentenchō Station =

Railway and metro station in Osaka, Japan

Coordinates: 34°40′8.7″N 135°27′45.6″E

Bentenchō Station 弁天町駅
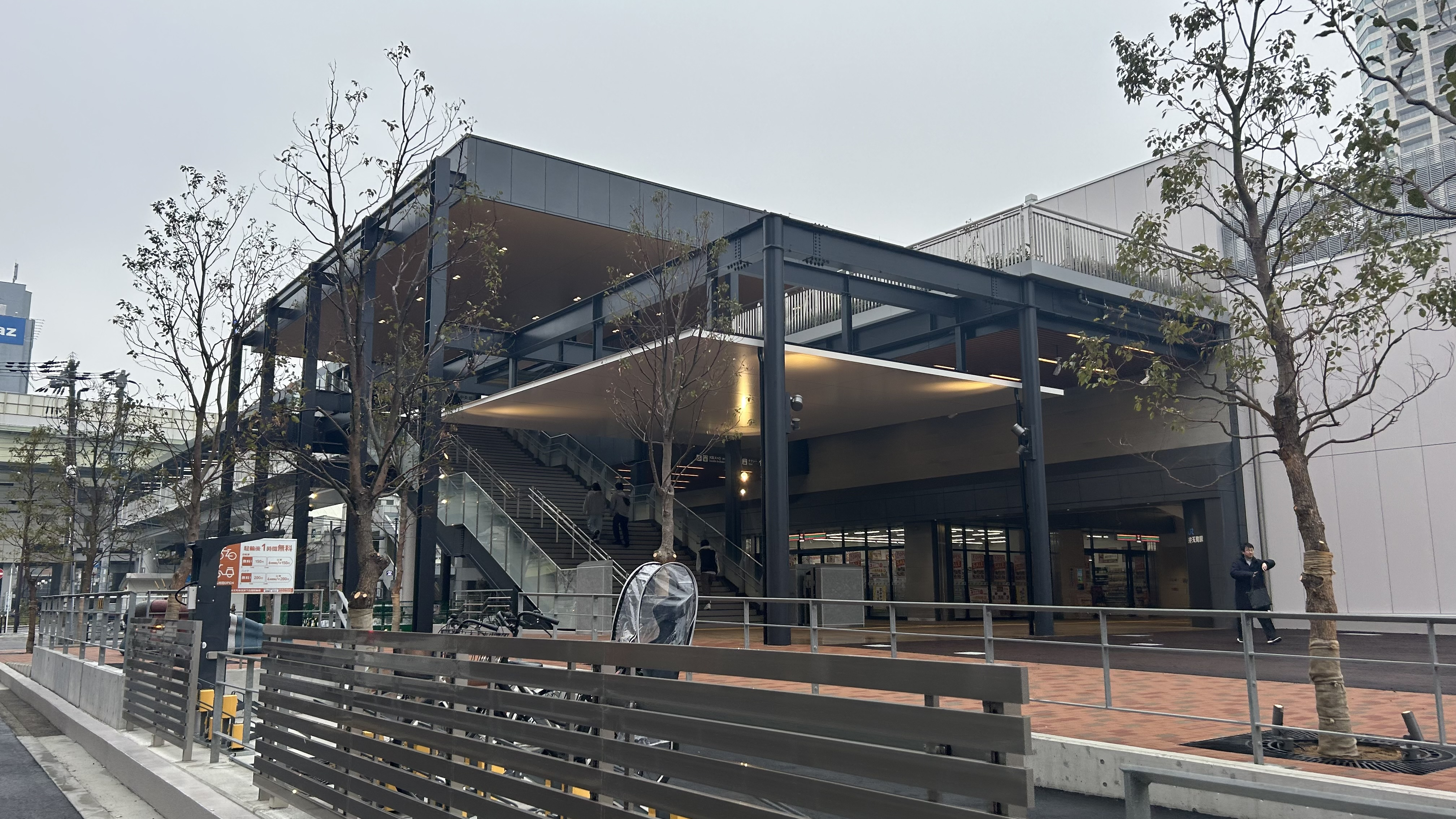
- JR station, March 2025

General information
- Location: 3-11-6 Namiyoke, Osaka, Osaka （大阪市港区波除三丁目11-6） Japan
- Operator: Osaka Metro; JR West
- Lines: Chūō Line; Osaka Loop Line

Other information
- Station code: C 13 (Osaka Metro Chūō Line); JR-O15 (Osaka Loop Line)

History
- Opened: 1961

Services
Preceding station	Osaka Metro	Following station
Asashiobashi C 12 towards Yumeshima	Chūō Line	Kujō C 14 towards Nagata
Location
- Location within Osaka Prefecture Location within Japan

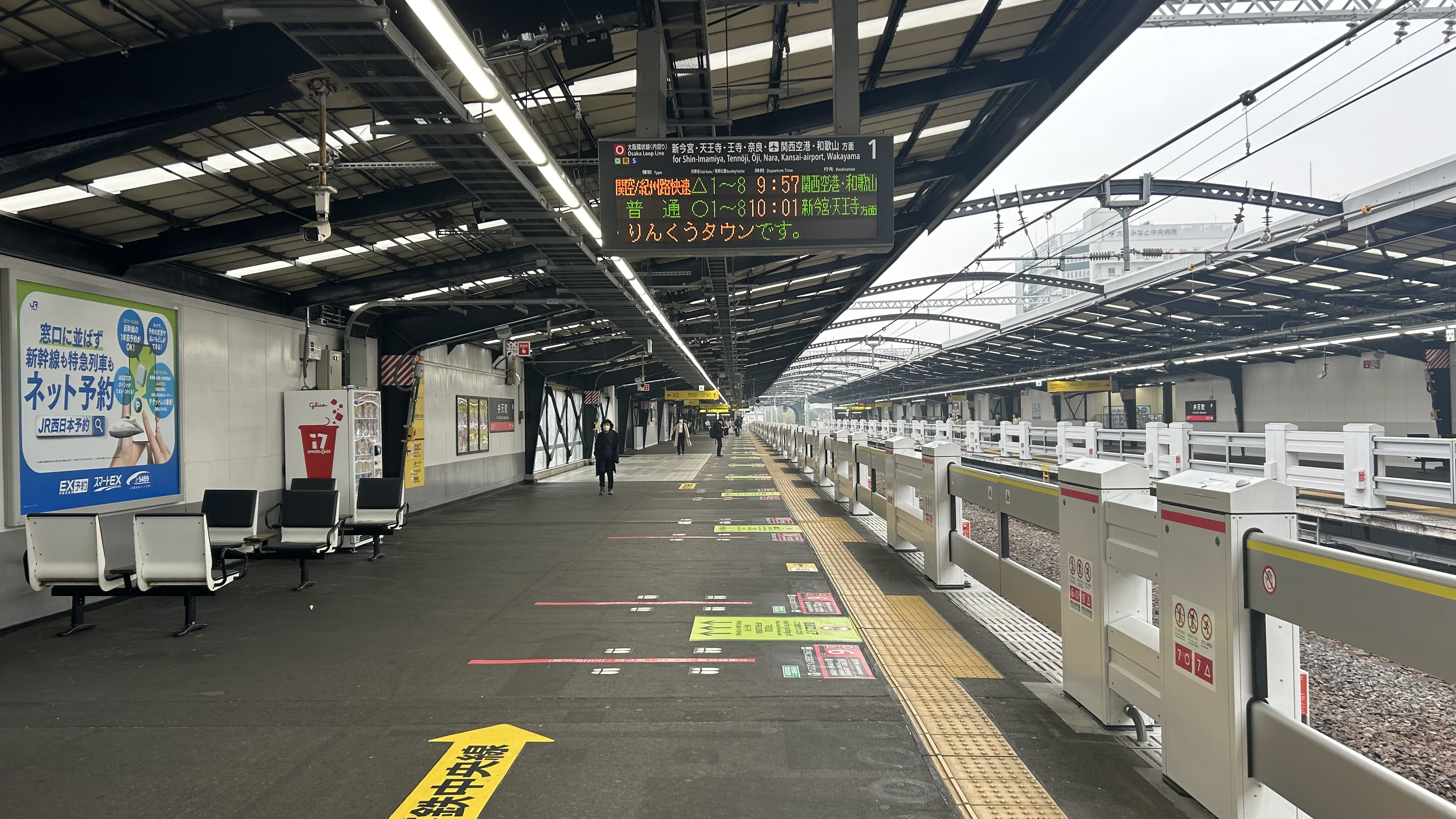
Osaka Loop Line platform, March 2025

Bentenchō Station (弁天町駅, Bentenchō-eki) is a train station in Namiyoke Sanchome, Minato-ku, Osaka, Japan.

== Lines ==
- JR West
  - Osaka Loop Line
- Osaka Metro
  - Chūō Line (Station Number: C13)

== Station layout ==
=== JR West ===
The JR West station has two side platforms serving a track each on the third floor.

1	■ Osaka Loop Line	inner track for Shin-Imamiya, Tennōji, Nara, Kansai Airport, and Wakayama
2	■ Osaka Loop Line	outer track for Nishikujo and Osaka

=== Osaka Metro ===
The station has two side platforms serving a track each over the Osaka Loop Line.

1	■ Chūō Line	for Hommachi, Tanimachi Yonchome, Nagata, Ikoma, and Gakken Nara-Tomigaoka
2	■ Chūō Line (Osaka)	for Osakako and Yumeshima

== Surrounding area ==
- Modern Transportation Museum (closed)
- Radio Osaka head office
- Osaka Resort City 200 (connected by pedway)
- Osaka Bay Tower (within Osaka Resort City 200)

== History ==
Station numbering was introduced to the JR West facilities in March 2018 with the Osaka Loop Line platforms being assigned station number JR-O15.

== Adjacent stations ==
«	Service	»
West Japan Railway Company (JR West) Osaka Loop Line
Limited Express Kuroshio: Does not stop at this station
Limited Express Haruka: Does not stop at this station
Nishikujō	Local	Taishō
Nishikujō	Regional Rapid Service	Taishō
Nishikujō	Direct Rapid Service (Clockwise trains only)	Taishō
Nishikujō	Yamatoji Rapid Service	Taishō
Nishikujō	Rapid Service	Taishō
Nishikujō	Kansai Airport Rapid Service	Taishō
Nishikujō	Kishuji Rapid Service	Taishō
