= Osaka 1st district =

- Parliamentary constituency for the Japanese House of Representatives
- Numbered map of the Osaka city single seats
- Prefecture: Osaka
- Proportional District: Kinki
- Electorate: 448,093

Current constituency
- Created: 1994
- Seats: One
- Party: Ishin
- Representative: Hidetaka Inoue
- Municipalities: Chūō-ku, Higashinari-ku, Minato-ku, Naniwa-ku, Nishi-ku, and Tennōji-ku of Osaka.

Osaka 1st district (大阪府第1区, Osaka-fu dai-ikku or simply 大阪1区, Osaka-ikku ) is a single-member constituency of the House of Representatives in the national Diet of Japan located in Osaka Prefecture.

== Areas covered ==
=== Since 2017 ===
- Part of Osaka
  - Chūō-ku
  - Higashinari-ku
  - Minato-ku
  - Naniwa-ku
  - Nishi-ku
  - Tennōji-ku

=== 1994 - 2017 ===
- Part of Osaka
  - Chūō-ku
  - Ikuno-ku
  - Minato-ku
  - Naniwa-ku
  - Nishi-ku
  - Tennōji-ku

== List of representatives ==
Election	Representative	Party	Notes
1996	Kōki Chūma	LDP	
2000	Kōki Chūma	LDP	
2003	Kōki Chūma	LDP	
2005	Kōki Chūma	LDP	
2009	Atsushi Kumada	Democratic	
2009	Atsushi Kumada	Tax Cuts	
2009	Atsushi Kumada	Tomorrow	
2012	Hidetaka Inoue	Restoration	
2014	Hidetaka Inoue	Innovation	
2014	Hidetaka Inoue	Ishin	
2017	Hiroyuki Ōnishi	LDP	
2021	Hidetaka Inoue	Ishin	
2024	Hidetaka Inoue	Ishin	
2026	Hidetaka Inoue	Ishin	

== Election results ==
=== 2026 ===
2026
Party	Candidate	Votes	%	±%
Ishin	Hidetaka Inoue	93,383	40.22	▼8.02
LDP	Hiroyuki Ōnishi	64,483	27.78	▲1.16
Sanseitō	Yuki Nakamura	27,950	12.04	▼0.20
DPP	Tomohiro Shiono	27,902	12.02	
JCP	Yoshinori Takeuchi	18,444	7.94	▼4.96
Majority		28,900	12.44	▼9.18
Registered electors		446,375		
Turnout		232,162	54.33	▲5.02
Ishin hold				

=== 2024 ===
2024
Party	Candidate	Votes	%	±%
Ishin	Hidetaka Inoue	102,113	48.24	
LDP	Hiroyuki Ōnishi	56,347	26.62	
JCP	Yoshinori Takeuchi	27,312	12.90	
Sanseitō	Chitose Miyade	25,908	12.24	New
Majority		45,766	21.62	
Registered electors		443,532		
Turnout			49.31	▼3.96
Ishin hold				

=== 2021 ===
2021
Party	Candidate	Votes	%	±%
Ishin	Hidetaka Inoue	110,120	49.40	
LDP	Hiroyuki Ōnishi	67,145	30.12	
CDP	Noriatsu Murakami	28,477	12.77	New
JCP	Yoshinori Takeuchi	17,194	7.71	
Majority		42,975	19.28	
Registered electors		427,637		
Turnout			53.27	▲7.49
Ishin gain from LDP				

=== 2017 ===
2017
Party	Candidate	Votes	%	±%
LDP	Hiroyuki Ōnishi	67,748	37.60	
Ishin	Hidetaka Inoue (Won PR seat)	66,506	36.91	
CDP	Noriatsu Murakami	26,140	14.51	New
JCP	Noboru Shibayama	14,498	8.05	
Japanese New Party	Shuhei Koizumi	5,291	2.94	
Majority		1,242	0.69	
Registered electors		403,292		
Turnout			45.78	▼0.05
LDP gain from Ishin				

=== 2014 ===
2014
Party	Candidate	Votes	%	±%
Innovation	Hidetaka Inoue	75,016	42.35	
LDP	Hiroyuki Ōnishi (Won PR seat)	71,648	40.45	
JCP	Yoshinori Takeuchi	30,463	17.20	
Majority		3,368	1.90	
Registered electors		403,593		
Turnout			45.83	▼9.47
Innovation hold				

=== 2012 ===
2012
Party	Candidate	Votes	%	±%
Restoration	Hidetaka Inoue	80,230	38.03	New
LDP	Hiroyuki Ōnishi	55,039	26.09	
Tomorrow	Atsushi Kumada	22,368	10.60	New
Independent	Kōki Chūma	20,167	9.56	New
JCP	Reiko Yoshikawa	17,281	8.19	
Democratic	Mika Yoshiba	15,878	7.53	
Majority		25,191	11.94	
Registered electors		394,097		
Turnout			55.30	▼6.71
Restoration gain from Tomorrow				

=== 2009 ===
2009
Party	Candidate	Votes	%	±%
Democratic	Atsushi Kumada	117,313	50.78	
LDP	Kōki Chūma	78,335	33.91	
JCP	Hideko Tsuji	20,438	8.85	
Independent	Yuki Sakai	11,374	4.92	New
Happiness Realization	Tomiko Hayashi	3,555	1.54	New
Majority		38,978	16.87	
Registered electors		380,575		
Turnout			62.01	▲0.53
Democratic gain from LDP				

=== 2005 ===
2005
Party	Candidate	Votes	%	±%
LDP	Kōki Chūma	116,956	54.49	
Democratic	Atsushi Kumada	72,512	33.79	
JCP	Hiroshi Maruoka	25,156	11.72	
Majority		44,444	20.70	
Registered electors		360,134		
Turnout			61.48	▲9.55
LDP hold				

=== 2003 ===
2003
Party	Candidate	Votes	%	±%
LDP	Kōki Chūma	87,936	49.83	
Democratic	Atsushi Kumada	64,320	36.45	
JCP	Hiroshi Seike	24,220	13.72	
Majority		23,616	13.38	
Registered electors		351,841		
Turnout			51.93	
LDP hold				

=== 2000 ===
2000
Party	Candidate	Votes	%	±%
LDP	Kōki Chūma	87,068	50.22	
Democratic	Toshihiro Konishi	41,431	23.89	New
JCP	Tsutomu Obata	38,543	22.23	
Independent	Seizo Hideyoshi Hashiba	6,347	3.66	New
Majority		45,637	26.33	
Registered electors				
Turnout				
LDP hold				

=== 1996 ===
1996
Party	Candidate	Votes	%	±%
LDP	Kōki Chūma	73,443	41.88	New
New Frontier	Masashi Ikenobō	62,423	35.60	New
JCP	Tsutomu Obata	39,494	22.52	New
Majority		11,020	6.28	
Registered electors				
Turnout				
LDP win (new seat)				
