= Inoue Hidetaka =

Japanese politician (born 1971)

- 井上 英孝
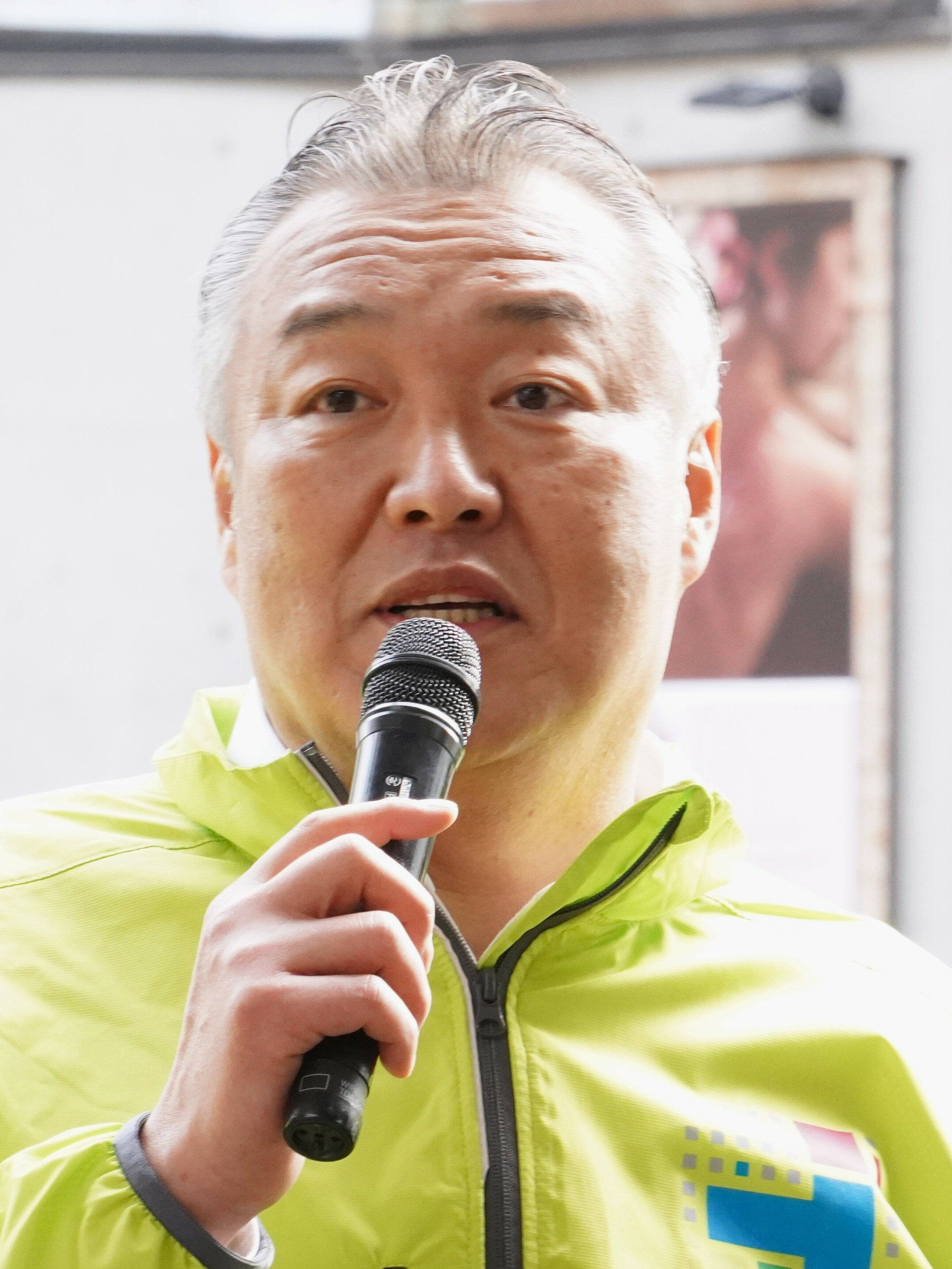
- Inoue in 2023

Member of the House of Representatives
- Incumbent
- Assumed office 17 December 2012
- Preceded by: Atsushi Kumada
- Constituency: Osaka 1st (2012–2017); Kinki PR (2017–2021); Osaka 1st (2021–present)

Member of the Osaka City Council
- In office 30 April 2003 – 20 November 2012
- Constituency: Minato Ward

Personal details
- Born: 25 October 1971 (age 54) Minato-ku, Osaka, Japan
- Party: Innovation (since 2015)
- Other political affiliations: LDP (2003–2010); ORA (2010–2012); JRP (2012–2014); JIP (2014–2015)
- Education: Kindai University

Inoue Hidetaka (Japanese: 井上英孝) is a Japanese politician. He is a member of the House of Representatives representing the Osaka 1st district. A member of the Japan Innovation Party (日本維新の会, Nippon Ishin no Kai), he was first elected in the 2012 Japanese general election and has been reelected to six consecutive terms most recently in the 2026 Japanese general election.
