= Mount Tenpō =

Japanese mountain

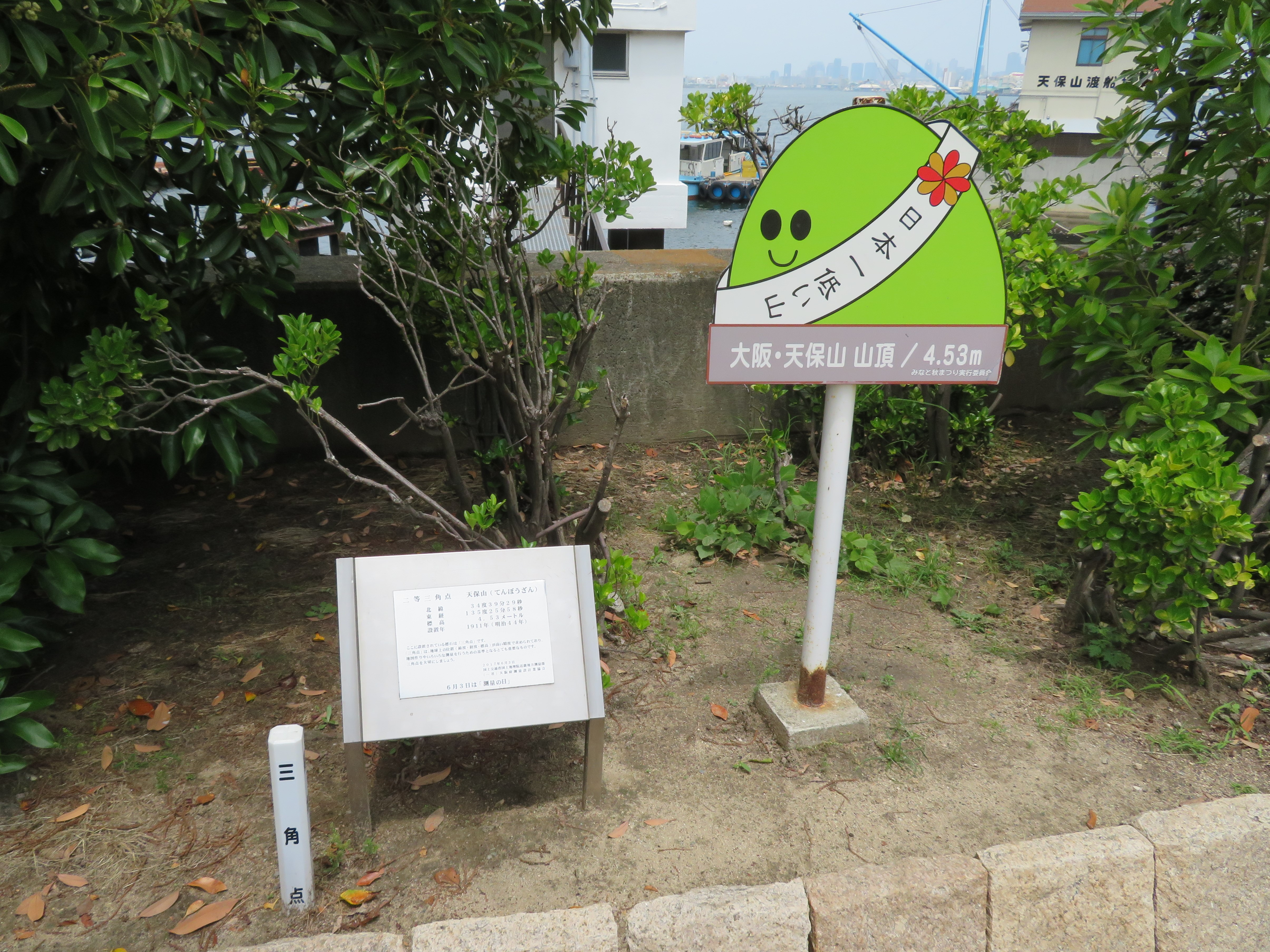
- Mount Tenpō summit area

Highest point
- Elevation: 4.53 m (14.9 ft)
- Coordinates: 34°39′29″N 135°25′58″E

Naming
- Language of name: Japanese
- Pronunciation: Japanese: [tempoːzaɴ]

Geography

Geology
- Mountain type: Man-made

Mount Tenpō (Japanese: 天保山, Hepburn: Tenpōzan), located in Minato-ku, Osaka, is Japan's second lowest mountain. The mountain's peak is 4.53 metres (14.9 ft) above sea level, and bears more resemblance to a hill than a mountain. A small port is located nearby, and much of the mountain's surface has been converted into a park.

== History ==
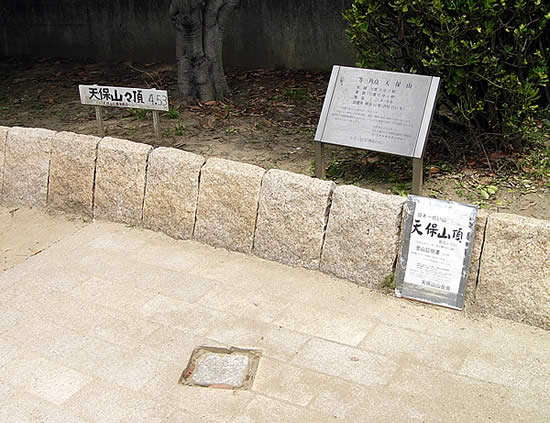
The peak of Mount Tenpō, indicated by the square tile on the ground.

Mount Tenpō was formed in 1831 (Tenpō year 2) as the deposit for earth dug up from dredging the Ajigawa river to allow easier access to Osaka for large ships and to prevent floods. The mountain had an elevation of about 20 metres (66 ft) at the time, and served as a marker for ships entering the Ajigawa river to head to the city of Osaka. Cherry blossom and pine trees were planted on the mountain as people began to set up shops in the area, and the mountain gradually became the visitor attraction that it is now. Images of children playing in this area were sketched in ukiyo-e by Utagawa Hiroshige and other artists.

Part of the mountain was leveled to set up an artillery unit to protect the river pass after the fall of the Tokugawa shogunate. As industrialization progressed in the Taishō and Shōwa periods, overuse of groundwater resulted in subsidence, lowering the mountain's elevation even further. This caused the mountain's name to be erased from topographic maps until it was reinstated due to fierce protests from local residents.

After subsidence due to the 2011 Tōhoku earthquake and tsunami, the title of Japan's lowest mountain passed to Mount Hiyori in Sendai, Miyagi Prefecture. From 1991 to 1996, Mount Hiyori had been measured at 6.05 metres (19.8 ft), after which Mount Tenpō was recognized as the lowest mountain; in 2014, the Geospatial Information Authority of Japan recognized Mount Hiyori, which now peaked at 3 metres (9.8 ft), as the lowest mountain in Japan.

== Location ==
The mountain is located about 400 metres (1,300 ft) north of the Ōsakakō Station stop of the Chūō Line.

=== Mount Tenpō Park ===
The mountain's surface is currently known as Mount Tenpō Park (天保山公園, Tenpōzan Kōen). Surrounded by a large levee, the park itself contains large hills (the deposits for earth dug up in constructing underground train tunnels) which have much higher elevations than the actual "peak" of the mountain.

A stone memorial of the Meiji Emperor's first sea-borne military parade in 1876 is located next to the triangular peak of the mountain. The park's clock-tower was originally a prop for a television show produced by the Kansai Telecasting Corporation, but was later donated to the prefecture. The park contains several art depicting the area during the Edo period.

=== Surrounding area ===
The mountain is located near several leisure and amusement facilities, including the Osaka Aquarium Kaiyukan and the Suntory Museum. It is also a short ferry ride away from Universal Studios Japan on Sakurajima (桜島線, Sakurajima) via the Tempozan Ferry Terminal. The Hanshin Expressway also has an exit named after Mount Tenpō.

== Mount Tenpō Mountaineering Club and Rescue Team ==
In 1997, in reaction to Mount Tenpō being listed as a mountain on the topological maps in 1996, two citizens founded the Mount Tenpō Mountaineering Club with the goal of establishing Mount Tenpō as a tourist attraction. The club held annual "climbing events" on new year's day and April 5th (in reference to Mount Tenpō's 4.5 meter elevation) which by 2000 drew the attendance of around a thousand people as well as newspaper and television coverage.

In the spirit of いちびり (ichibiri, an Osaka dialect term meaning "taking a joke to the extreme") they issued commemorative "mountain climbing certificates" at these events and also to anyone who would apply and pay the issuance fee of 10 yen. The club also formed a "Mount Tenpō Rescue Team", staffed by two members.

In 2005, the club ceased its operation out of a café in the vicinity of Mount Tenpō. The reopening of the club was announced for 2010, but their website since closed and current operations are unknown.

== See also ==
- List of the 100 famous mountains in Japan
- List of mountains and hills of Japan by height
- List of records of Japan
