= Yahataya Park =

Park in Minato-ku, Osaka, Japan

Coordinates: 34.6605°N 135.4472°E

- 八幡屋公園
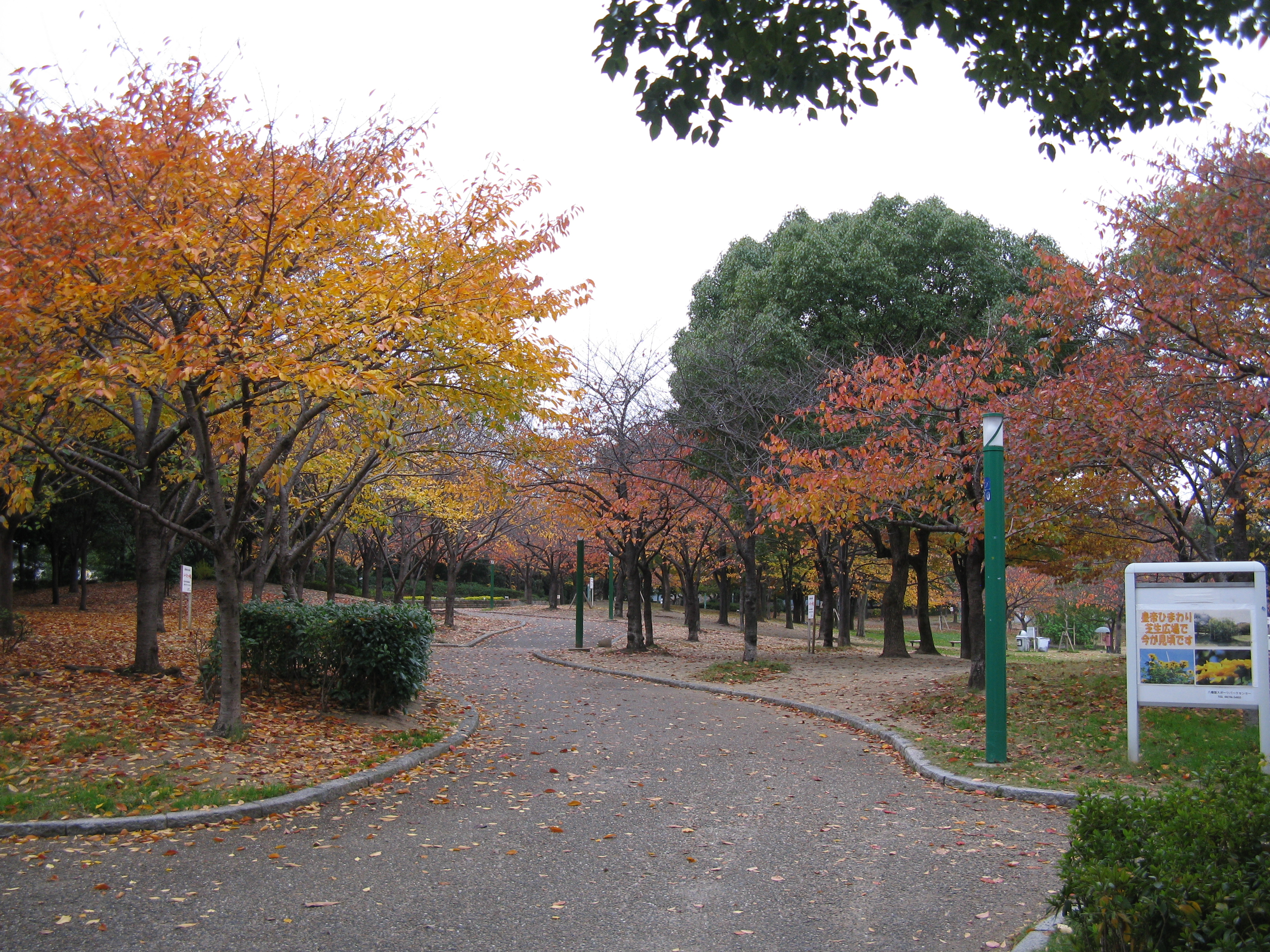
- Interactive map of Yahataya Park
- Location: Minato-ku, Osaka
- Website: www.yahataya-park.jp

The Yahataya Sports Park Center (八幡屋スポーツパークセンター, Yahataya Supōtsu Pāku Sentā) also known as Yahataya Park (八幡屋公園, Yahataya kōen) is a park in Osaka, Japan

It was established in April 1923 as the city athletic field which hosted the 1923 Far Eastern Championship Games. It later became a venue for international trade fairs. It currently hosts the Osaka Municipal Central Gymnasium, and Osaka Pool, a swimming and ice rink facility.
