= Maruzen Intec Osaka Pool =

Coordinates: 34°39′39″N 135°26′50″E

Osaka Pool
- 大阪プール
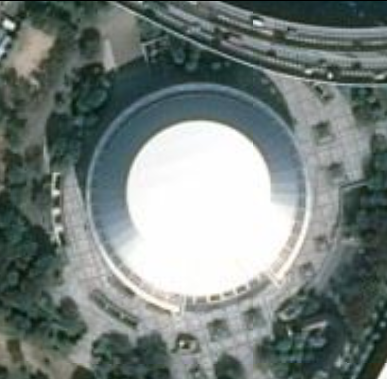
- Interactive map of Osaka Pool
- Location: Yahataya Park, Minato-ku, Osaka
- Capacity: 3,520
- Building details

Technical details
- Floor count: 4 (inc. 2 basement levels)

Maruzen Intec Osaka Pool is a swimming venue in Osaka, Japan. It hosted the figure skating events for the 2000 Four Continents Figure Skating Championships.

== See also ==
- Osaka Municipal Central Gymnasium
