= Osaka Municipal Central Gymnasium =

Indoor arena Minato-ku, Osaka Prefecture, Japan

Coordinates: 34°39′33.70″N 135°26′40.60″E

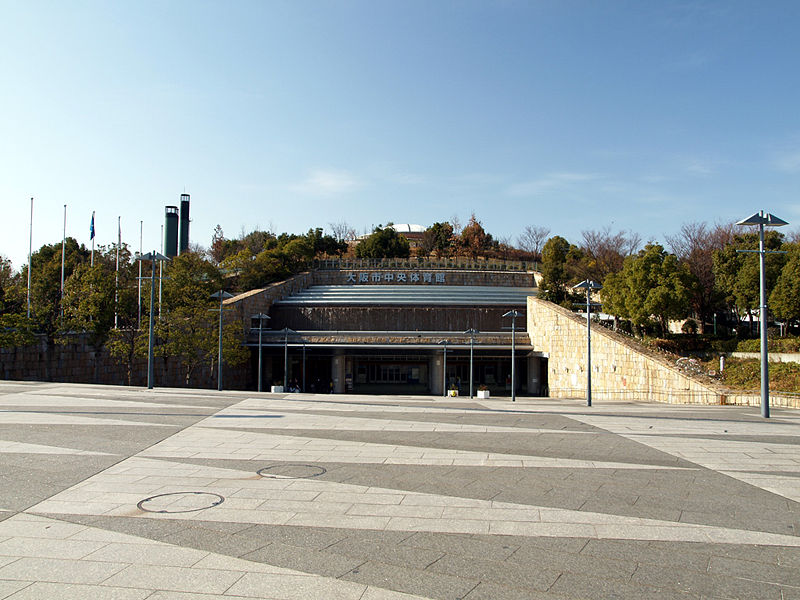
- Interactive map of Osaka Municipal Central Gymnasium
- Location: Minato-ku, Osaka City, Osaka Prefecture, Japan
- Owner: Osaka City
- Operator: Osaka Sports Green Foundation
- Capacity: 10,000 Seats; 16,000 Full Arena/Concerts
- Public transit: Asashiobashi Station

Construction
- Opened: 1996
- Architects: Osaka City, Nikken Sekkei
- Main contractors: Obayashi Corporation, Nishimatsu Construction, Asanuma Corporation

Website
- http://www.yahataya-park.jp/osaka_arena/index.html

Osaka Municipal Central Gymnasium (大阪市中央体育館, Ōsaka-shi Chūō Taiikukan), also known as the Asue Arena Osaka (Asueアリーナ大阪) for sponsorship reasons, is an indoor sporting arena located in Minato-ku, Osaka City, Osaka Prefecture, Japan. The arena was opened on 1996. From 1 March 2018 onwards, the arena was named as Maruzen Intec Arena Osaka (丸善インテックアリーナ大阪) after Maruzen Intec secured naming rights for the arena. The name was changed to the current one in 2022 as Maruzen Intec renamed their company as Asue.

This arena was built in Yahataya Park in the Osaka Bay area. The arena is all underground and the roof is covered with planting.

== History ==
- June 1993 - Start to construction.
- April 1996 - Finish to construction.

== Uses ==
The arena hosted several matches for the Women's Volleyball World Championship for its 1998, 2006, 2010, and 2026 editions.

B.League team Osaka Evessa (basketball team) holds home games at the Ookini Arena Maishima, but Osaka Evessa may also hold home games at the Osaka Municipal Central Gymnasium.

F.League team Shriker Osaka (futsal team) holds home games at the Osaka Municipal Central Gymnasium.

== Facilities ==
Main Arena

- Floor size - 46 m × 77 m (3,580 m^{2})
- Height - 19 m
- Full arena - 16,000 people
- Capacity - 10,000 people
- Fixed seats - 5,932 seats
- Movable seats - 1,390 seats

Sub Arena

- Pitch size - 35 m × 38 m (1,540 m^{2})
- Height - 12.5 m
- Fixed seats - 188 seats
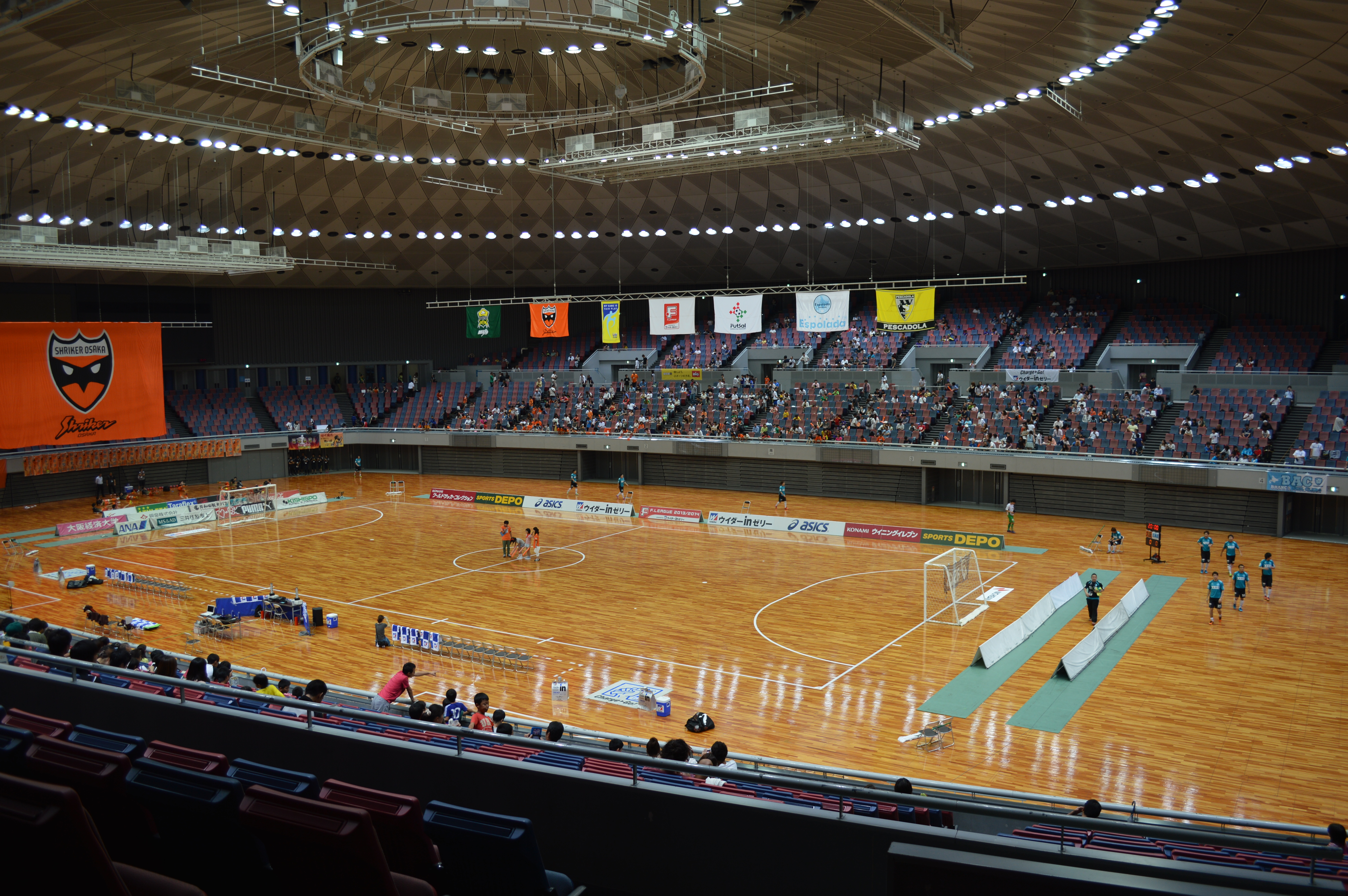
Main arena (F.League game)

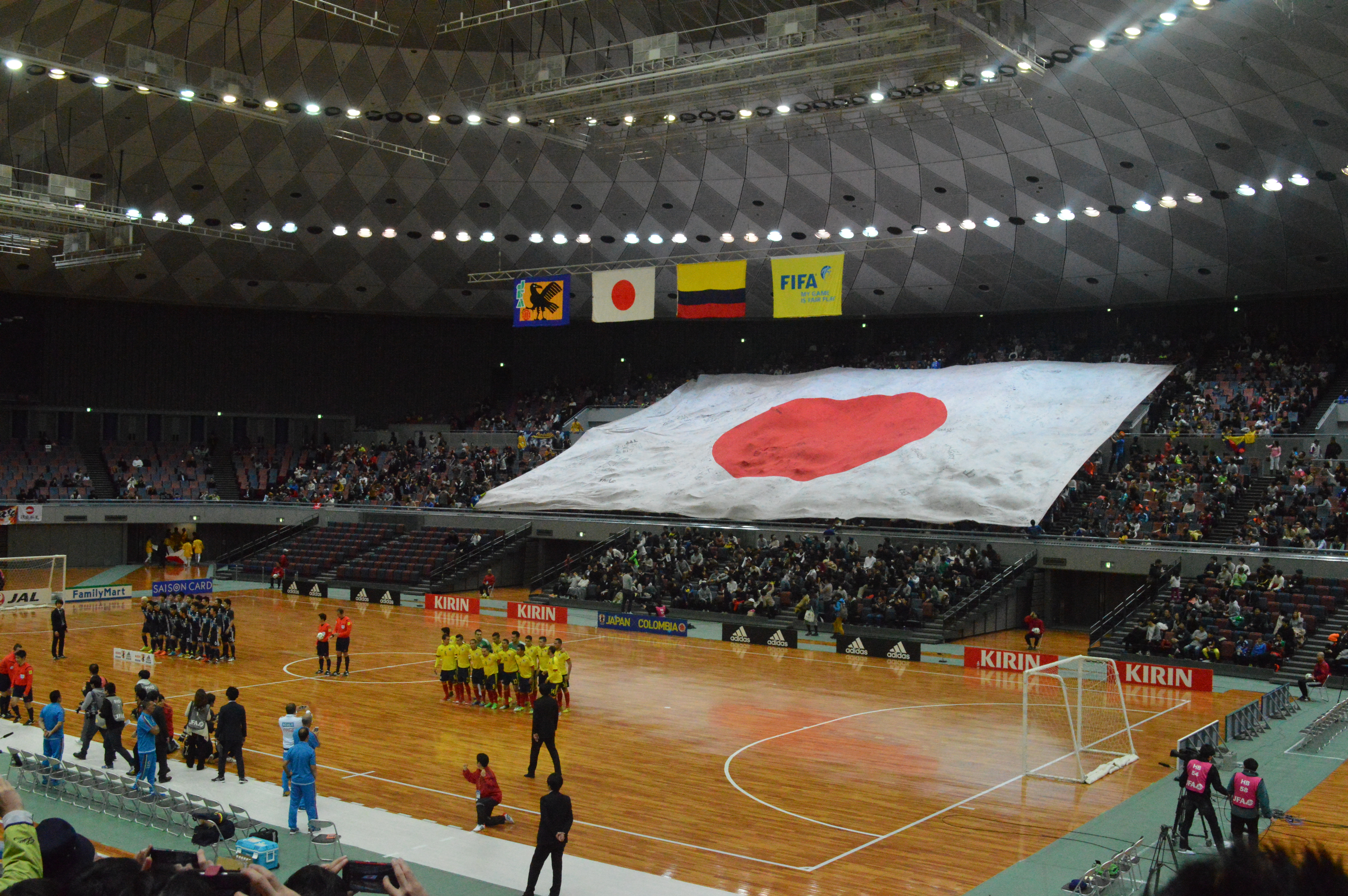
Main arena (Futsal game)

== Access ==
- 3 minute walk from Asashiobashi Station of Osaka Metro Chūō Line

== See also ==
- Osaka Pool
