= Kōki Chūma =

Japanese politician (born 1936)

- 中馬 弘毅
- Official portrait, 2002

Member of the House of Representatives
- In office 19 February 1990 – 21 July 2009
- Preceded by: Ikuko Ishii
- Succeeded by: Atsushi Kumada
- Constituency: Osaka 6th (1990–1996); Osaka 1st (1996–2009)
- In office 23 June 1980 – 2 June 1986
- Preceded by: Toshio Kanzaki
- Succeeded by: Ikuko Ishii
- Constituency: Osaka 6th
- In office 6 December 1976 – 7 September 1979
- Preceded by: Toshio Kanzaki
- Succeeded by: Toshio Kanzaki
- Constituency: Osaka 6th

Personal details
- Born: 8 October 1936 (age 90) Tennōji, Osaka, Japan
- Party: Liberal Democratic
- Other political affiliations: NLC (1976–1986)
- Parent: Kaoru Chūma (father)
- Education: University of Tokyo

Kōki Chūma (中馬 弘毅, Chūma Kōki; born 8 October 1936) is a former Japanese politician who served in the House of Representatives in the Diet (national legislature) as a member of the Liberal Democratic Party. A native of Osaka, Osaka and graduate of the University of Tokyo he was elected for the first time in 1976 as a member of the now-defunct party New Liberal Club. His father is Kaoru Chūma, former Mayor of Osaka.
