= Osaka Bay Tower =

Mixed-use Skyscraper in Osaka, Japan

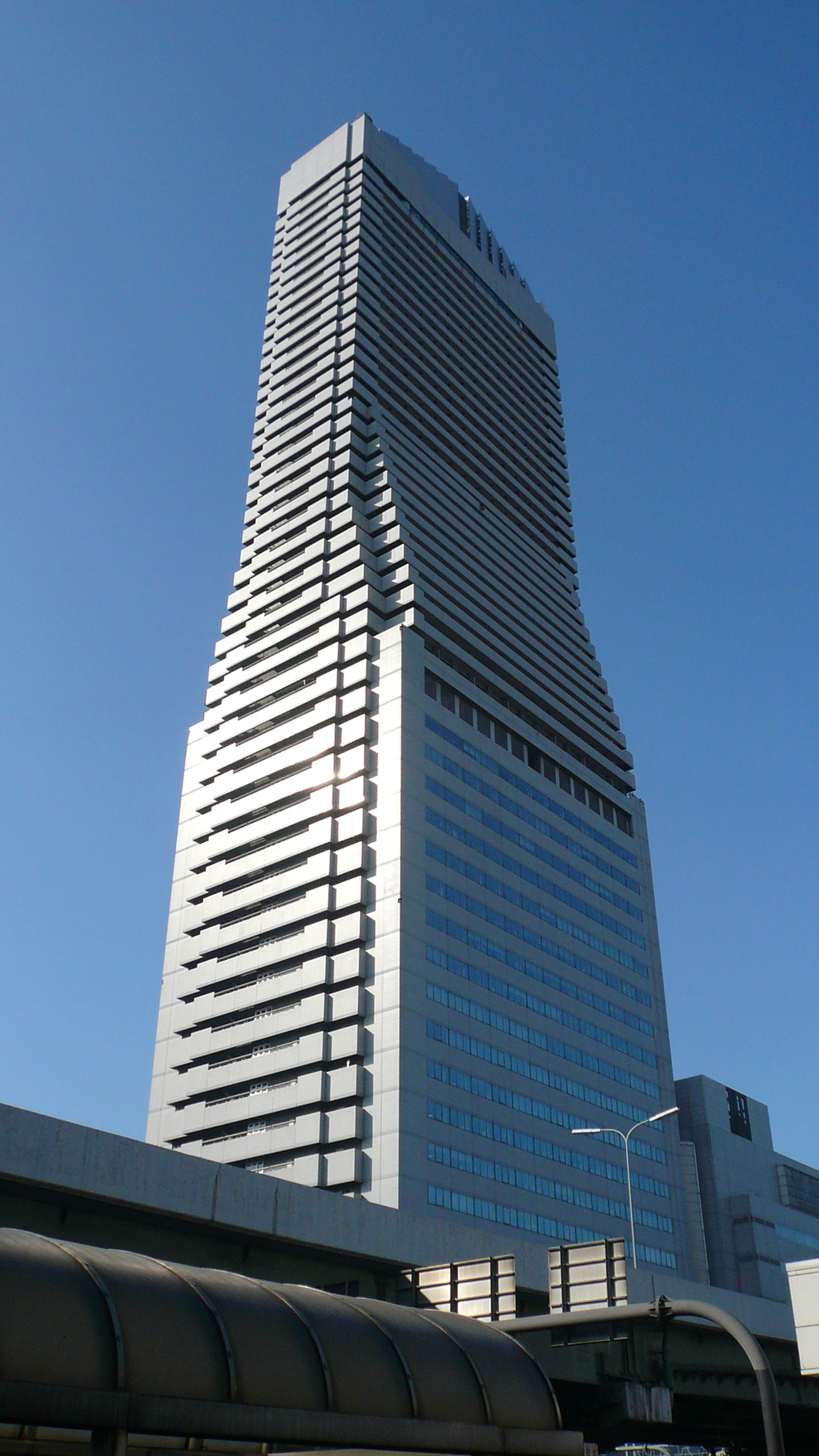

General information
- Status: Completed
- Location: 2-1, 1 Benten, Minato-ku, Osaka, Japan
- Coordinates: 34.669327°N 135.461151°E
- Completed: March 1993

Height
- Roof: 200.05 m (656.3 ft)
- Top floor: 188.7 m (619 ft)

Technical details
- Floor count: 51

Design and construction
- Architect: Yasui Architects & Engineers, Inc.
- Main contractor: Shimizu Corporation

The Osaka Bay Tower (大阪ベイタワー), also known as ORC 1, is a mixed-use, mainly hotel and office, skyscraper in the Osaka Resort City 200 building complex located in the Minato-ku ward of Osaka, Japan. Completed in March 1993, it stands at 200 m (656 ft) tall, with the top floor located at 188.7 m (619 ft). It is the 5th tallest building in Osaka Prefecture and the 36th tallest building in Japan.

== See also ==
- List of tallest structures in Osaka Prefecture
