= Asashiobashi Station =

Metro station in Osaka, Japan

Coordinates: 34°39′39″N 135°26′56″E

Asashiobashi Station 朝潮橋駅
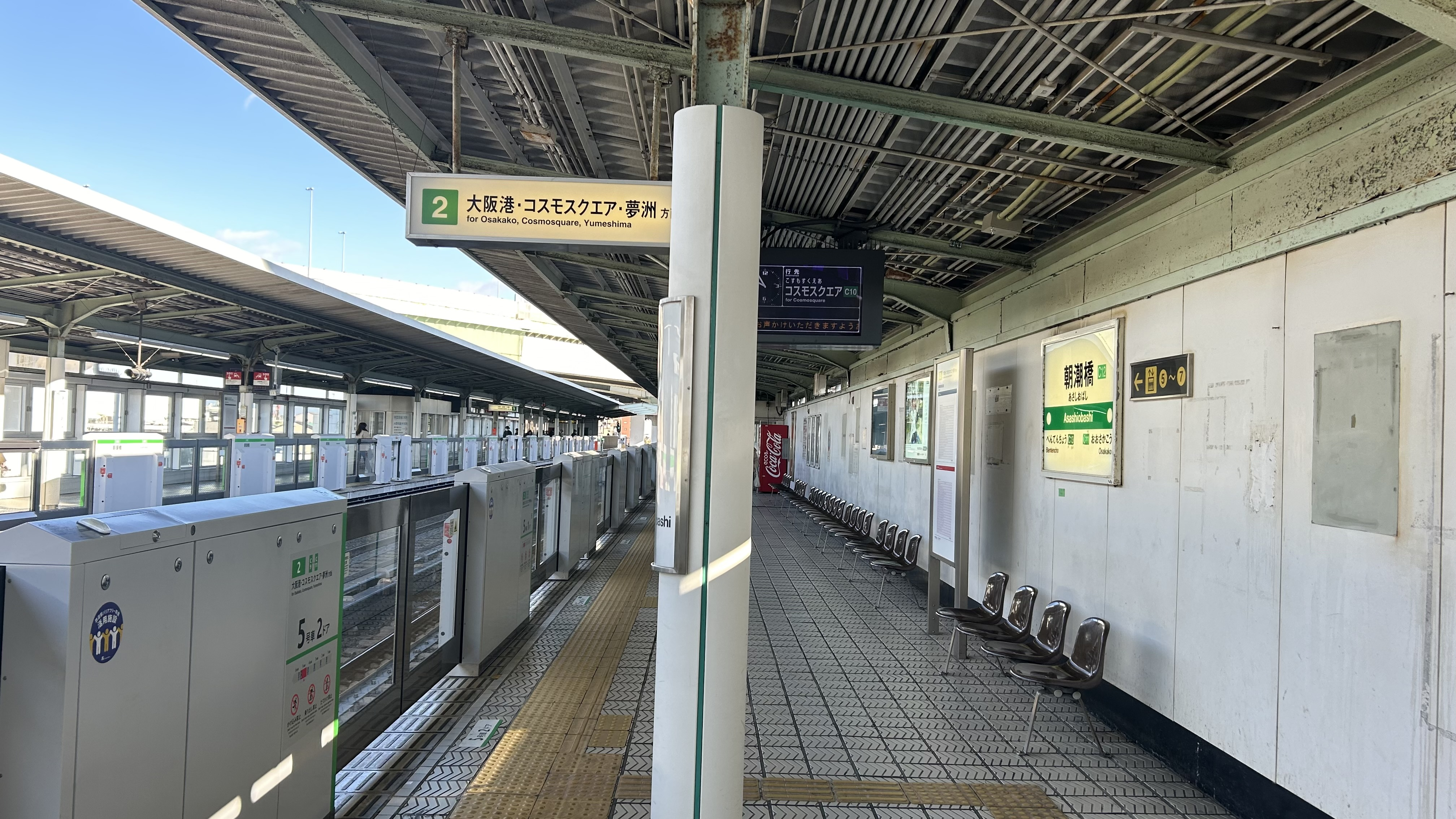
- Station platform

General information
- Location: 3-1-4 Tanaka, Minato, Osaka, Osaka （大阪市港区田中三丁目1-4） Japan
- Operator: Osaka Metro
- Line: Chūō Line

Other information
- Station code: C 12

History
- Opened: 1961

Passengers
- FY2016: 20,368 daily

Services
Preceding station	Osaka Metro	Following station
Ōsakakō C 11 towards Yumeshima	Chūō Line	Bentenchō C 13 towards Nagata
Location
- Location within Osaka Prefecture Location within Japan

Asashiobashi Station (朝潮橋駅, Asashiobashi-eki; Station number: C12) is a train station on the Osaka Metro Chūō Line in Minato-ku, Osaka, Japan. It is the stop that services the Osaka Municipal Central Gymnasium and Osaka city pool.

== Station layout ==
There are two side platforms with a track each on the third floor.

1	■ Chūō Line	for Hommachi, Tanimachi Yonchome, Morinomiya, Nagata, Ikoma and Gakken Nara-Tomigaoka
2	■ Chūō Line	for Osakako and Yumeshima
