= Modern Transportation Museum =

Coordinates: 34.67070°N 135.46190°E

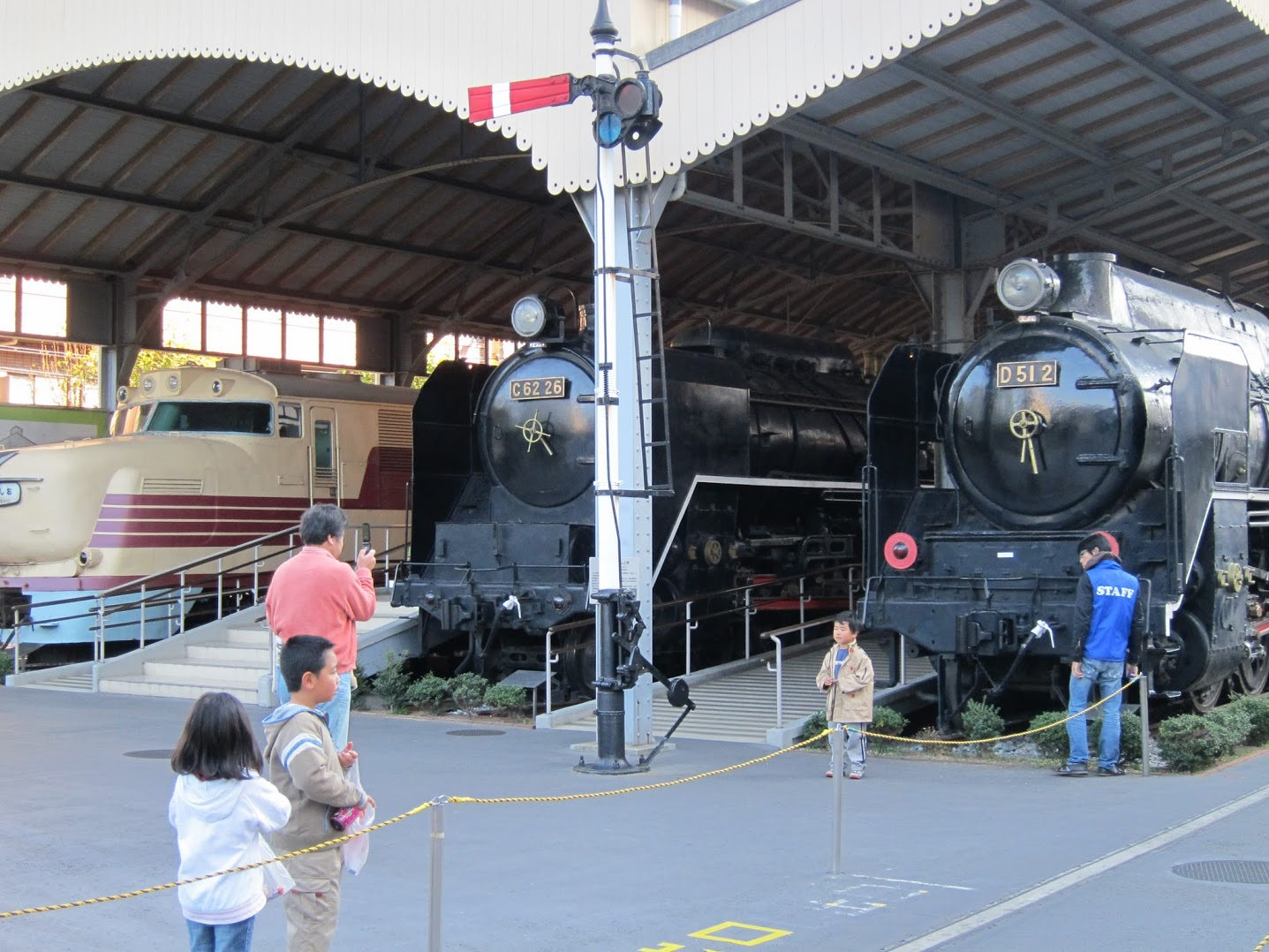
- Established: 21 January 1962
- Dissolved: 6 April 2014
- Location: Minato-ku, Osaka, Japan
- Type: Railway museum
- Public transit access: Bentencho Station
- Website: www.mtm.or.jp/eng

The Modern Transportation Museum (交通科学博物館, Kōtsū Kagaku Hakubutsukan) was the corporate museum operated by West Japan Railway Company (JR West) in Minato-ku, Osaka, Japan. It opened on 21 January 1962, next to Bentencho Station on the Osaka Loop Line. The collection included steam locomotives, electric locomotives, diesel locomotives, a prototype of a magnetic levitation train, and the original engine of a Messerschmitt Me 163.

The museum was closed on 6 April 2014, and the exhibits were moved to what eventually became the Kyoto Railway Museum in 2016.

== See also ==
- Railway Museum (JR East counterpart in Saitama, Saitama)
- SCMaglev and Railway Park (JR Central counterpart in Nagoya)
