= Mount Hiyori =

Mountain in Sendai, Miyagi, Japan

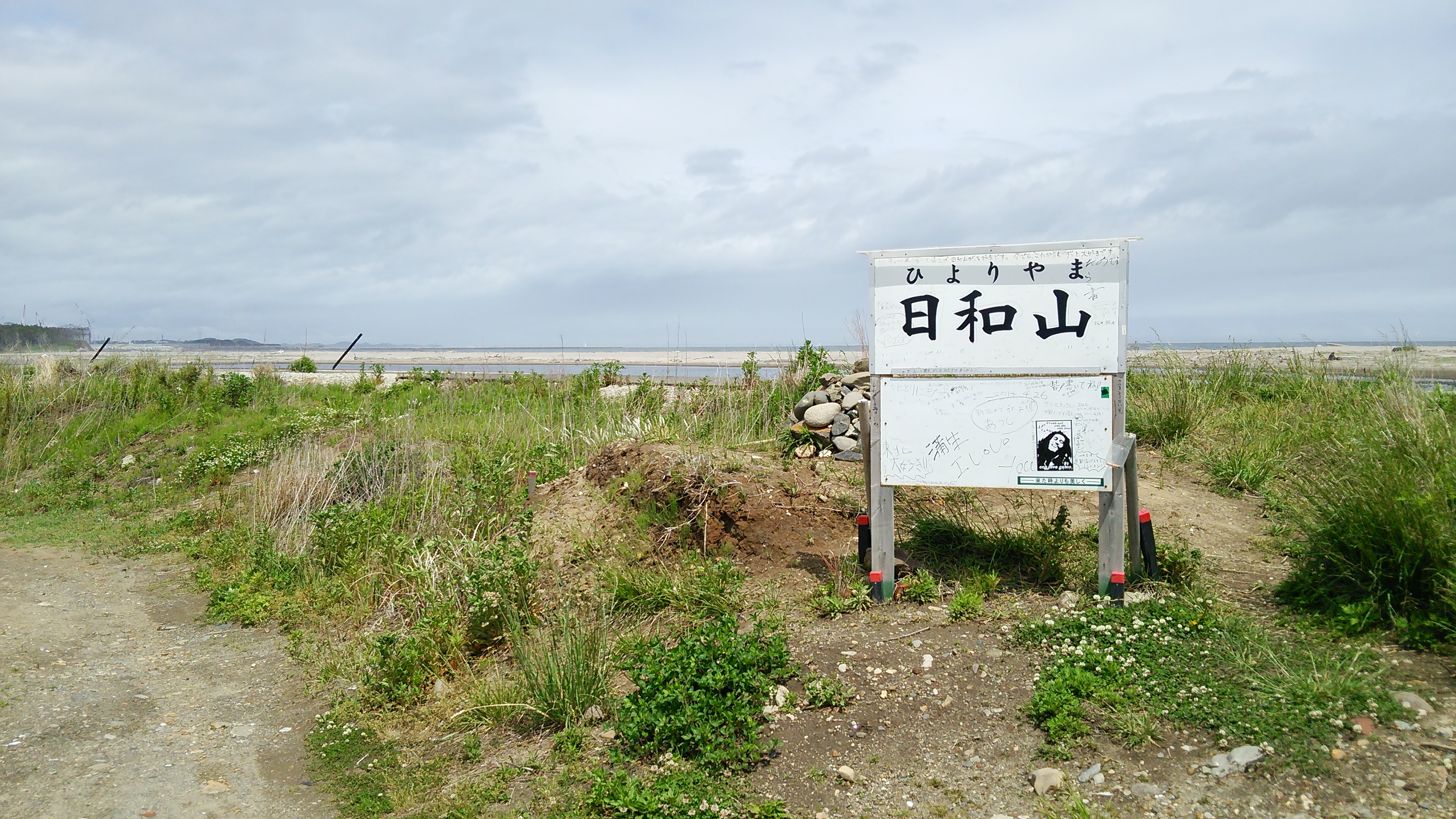
- Hiyoriyama after the disaster of 2011 (May 30, 2014)

Highest point
- Elevation: 3 m (9.8 ft)
- Coordinates: 38°15′20″N 141°00′42″E

Naming
- Native name: 日和山

Geography

Geology
- Mountain type: Man-made

Mount Hiyori (日和山, Hiyoriyama) located in Sendai, Miyagi Prefecture, is Japan's lowest mountain. From 1991 to 1996, and again on April 9, 2014, after the Tohoku tsunami, the Geospatial Information Authority of Japan recognized it as "the lowest mountain in Japan".

== Overview ==
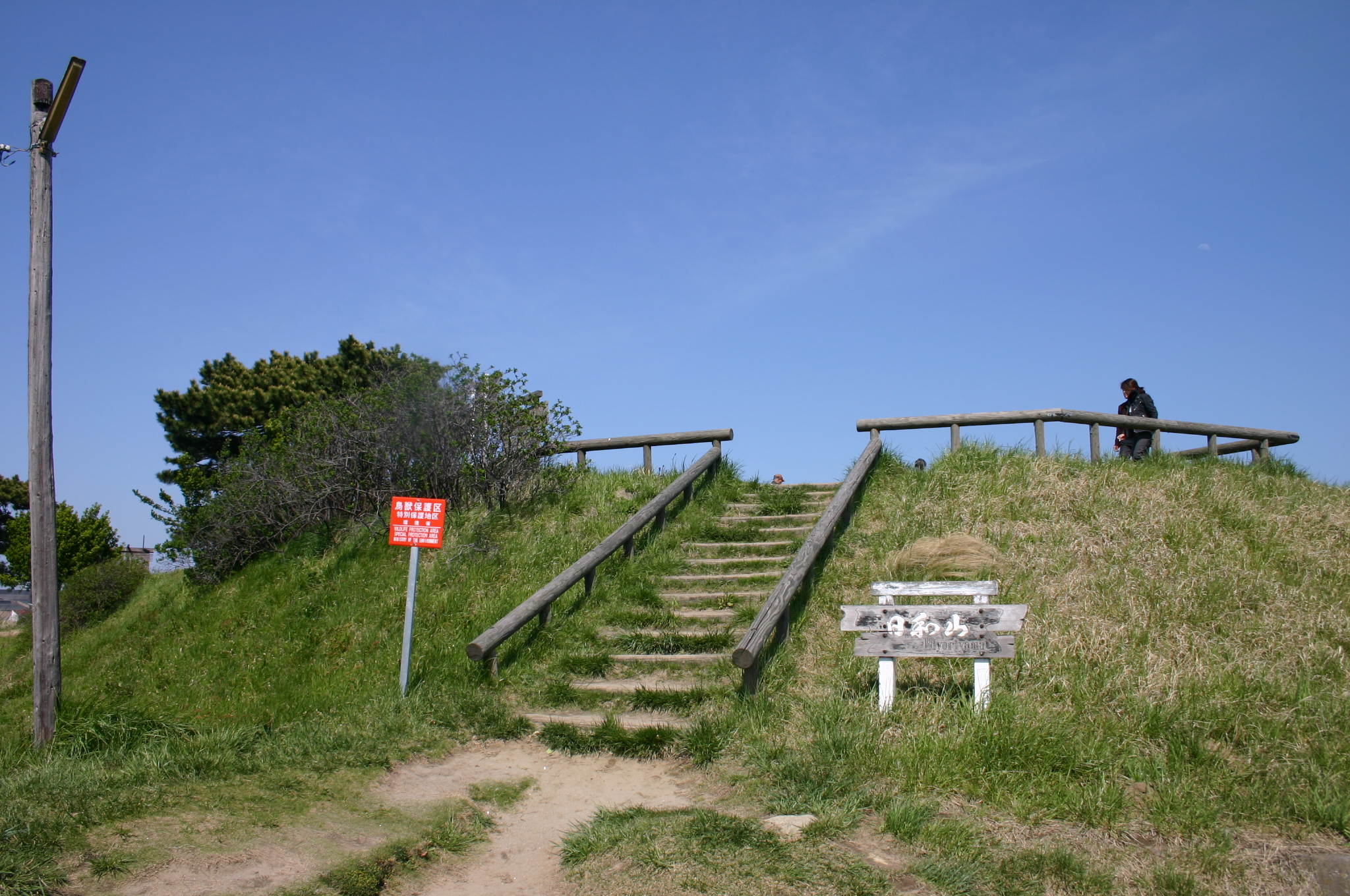
Mount Hiyori in 2004

The mountain is located on the northeastern edge of Sendai City, facing the Pacific Ocean and Sendai, north of the mouth of the Nanakita River, and west of Gamo Mudflat.

It used to be 6.05 metres (19.8 ft) above sea level, with a massif of about 40 metres (130 ft) from north to south and about 20 metres (66 ft) from east to west. There was one trail on the southwestern part of the massif, with 14 steps. During the Showa period, Kawaguchi Shrine (founded in 1374 (Southern Court: 3rd year of Bunchu; Northern Court: 7th year of Ōan)) was relocated at the northern foot of Mt. Hiyori.

At one time, it was recognized as the lowest mountain in Japan as a mountain on the topographic map of the Geospatial Information Authority of Japan, but that position was ceded when Mount Tenpō (Osaka City) was re-listed. For this reason, the word "Gan-so" (元祖, meaning "original") was added to the information signboard at the summit that read "the lowest mountain in Japan".

In 2011 (Heisei 23), it was reported that the ground subsided due to the 2011 Tōhoku earthquake and tsunami and that it was destroyed along with the Gamo Tidal Flat after being hit directly by the tsunami. At the same time, Kawaguchi Shrine was washed away by the tsunami. On April 9, 2014, it was recognized as a mountain with an altitude of 3 metres (9.8 ft) in a survey by the Geospatial Information Authority of Japan. As a result, it fell below Mount Tenpō for the first time in 18 years and again became the lowest mountain in Japan.
