= Ōsakakō Station =

Metro station in Osaka, Japan

Coordinates: 34.6540°N 135.4345°E

Ōsakakō Station 大阪港駅
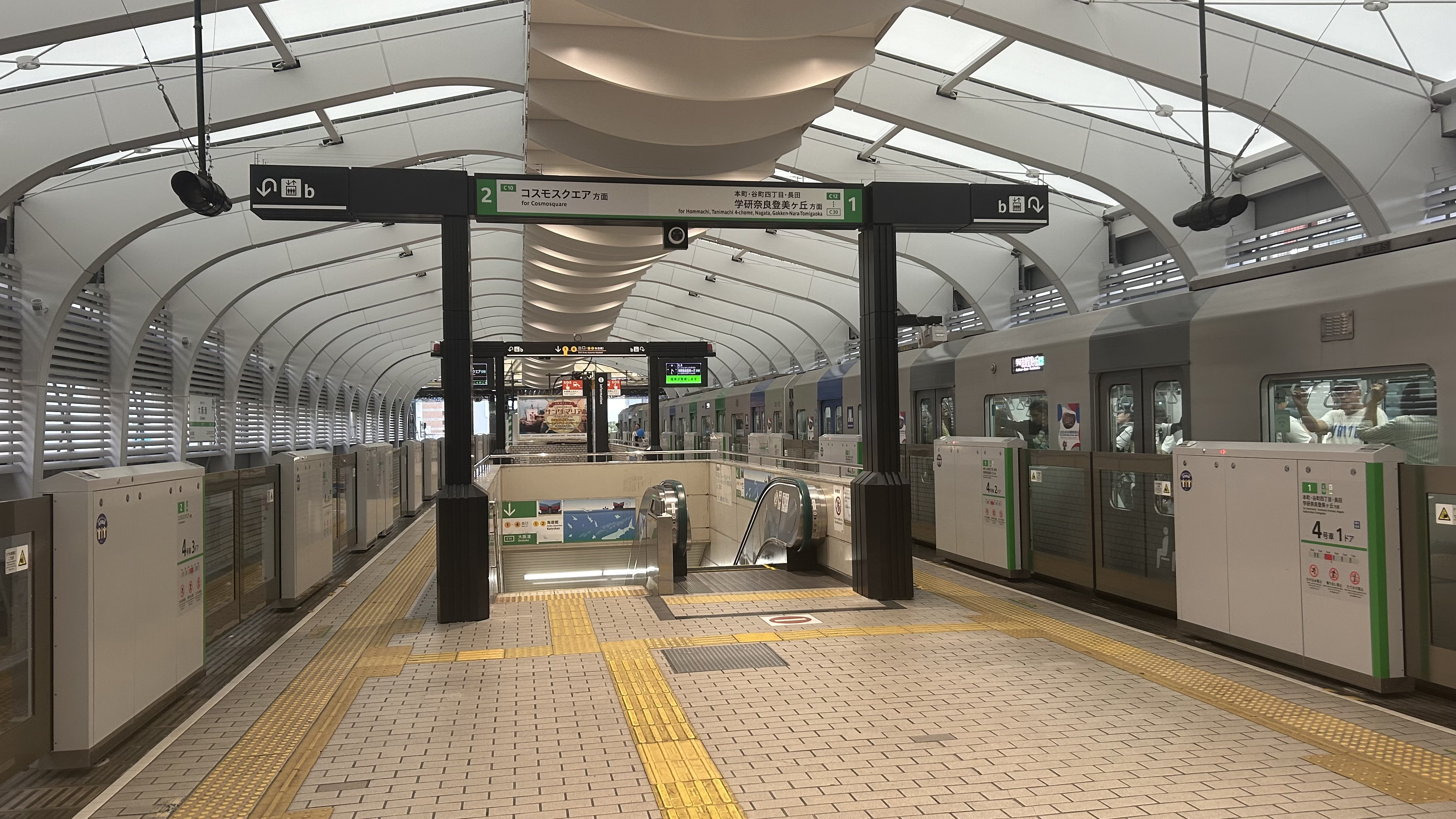
- Platforms, October 2024

General information
- Other names: Tempozan
- Location: 3-5-9 Chikkō, Minato, Osaka, Osaka （大阪市港区築港三丁目5-9） Japan
- Operator: Osaka Metro
- Line: Chūō Line

Other information
- Station code: C 11

History
- Opened: 1961

Services
| Preceding station | Osaka Metro | Following station |
|---|---|---|
| Cosmosquare C 10 towards Yumeshima | Chūō Line | Asashiobashi C 12 towards Nagata |
Location
- Location within Osaka Prefecture Location within Japan

Osakako Station (大阪港駅, Ōsakakō-eki; Station number: C11) is a train station on the Osaka Metro Chūō Line in Minato-ku, Osaka, Japan. It is the stop that serves the Osaka Aquarium Kaiyukan aquarium.

This station is not to be confused with the unrelated Osaka-Minato goods station of the Naniwa Freight Line located a few hundred metres west which was operated by JGR and JNR between 1928 and 1984.

== Station layout ==
There is an elevated island platform with two tracks on the third floor.

| 1 | ■ Chūō Line | for Hommachi, Tanimachi Yonchome, Morinomiya, Nagata, Ikoma, and Gakken Nara-Tomigaoka |
| 2 | ■ Chūō Line | for Yumeshima |

== Surroundings ==
- Osaka Aquarium Kaiyukan
- Tempozan Ferris Wheel
- Tempozan
- Osaka Bay Cruise Santa Maria
- Tempozan Marketplace
  - LEGOLAND Discovery Centre Osaka
  - Naniwa Kuishinbo Yokocho
- Tempozan Ferry Terminal
- Hotel Seagull Tempozan Osaka
