= Osaka Resort City 200 =

Skyscrapers in Osaka

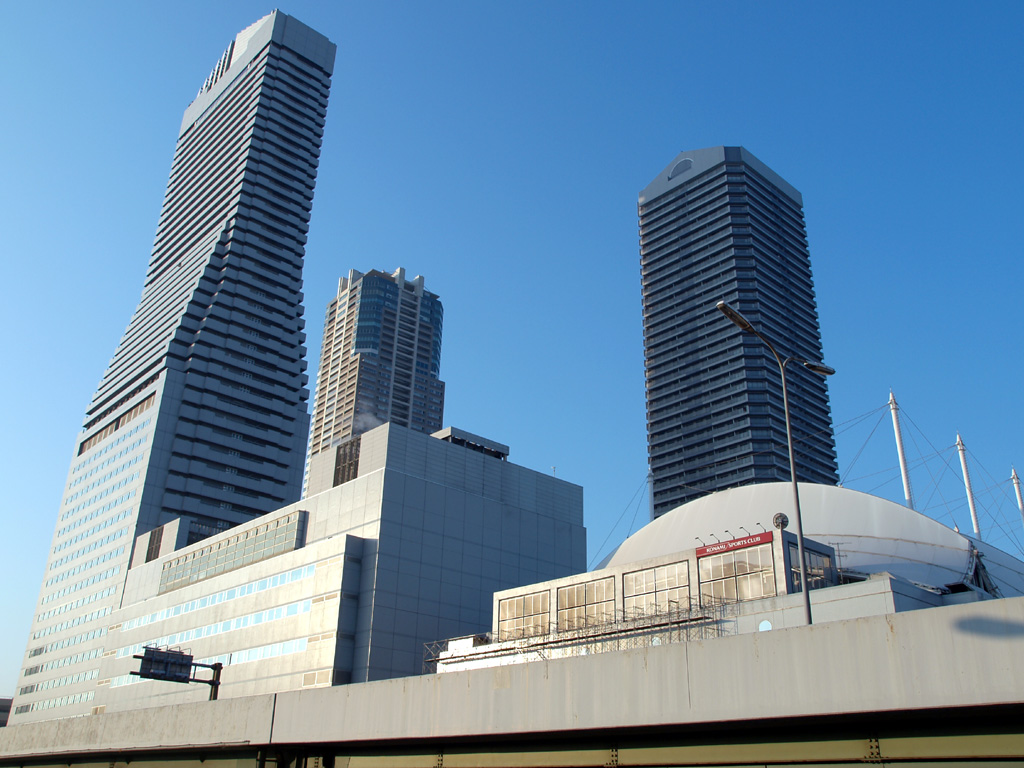
- ORC 200 and X-Tower Osaka Bay (the high-rise in the middle)
- Interactive map of the Osaka Resort City 200 area

General information
- Status: Completed
- Location: Minato-ku, Osaka, Japan
- Coordinates: 34.6697348°N 135.4606288°E
- Completed: March 1993
- Cost: 83 billion yen

Height
- Height: 200 m (660 ft) (Osaka Bay Tower); 167 m (548 ft) (Prio Tower)

Technical details
- Floor area: 252,778 m^{2} (2,720,880 sq ft)

Design and construction
- Architect: Yasui Architects & Engineers, Inc.
- Structural engineer: Yasui Architects & Engineers, Inc. associated with R.I.A. and Showa Sekkei
- Main contractor: Shimizu Corporation

The Osaka Resort City 200 is a building complex in the Minato-ku ward of Osaka, Japan. Completed in March 1993, it consists of four blocks, including the Osaka Bay Tower, the height of which in meters is referenced in the complex's name.

== Overview ==
ORC 200 is a mixed-use complex featuring housing, offices, hotels, shops and other facilities. 22,687 square metres (244,200 sq ft) of the total area of 30,123 square metres (324,240 sq ft) is occupied by the Osaka Bay Tower, the Prio Tower, and a few other buildings. All of them are connected to each other by a pedway and surround an atrium located in the center. The first, 200 metres (660 ft) high skyscraper houses the Mitsui Urban Hotel, while the latter, shorter – 167 metres (548 ft) high – building is dedicated to residential usage. Several floors of both buildings are meant for offices. The remaining two blocks include a radio station, a musical hall, a sports club, restaurants and shops. The leisure facilities feature one of Japan's largest indoor swimming pools. The total floor area of the ORC 200 complex equals 252,778 m^{2} (2,720,880 sq ft).

Developed by the Shimizu Corporation in accordance with the design by Yasui Architects & Engineers, Inc., it was a part of a Land Trust Program in Osaka. The construction of the complex costed 83 billion yen. In August 2006, 200 metres (660 ft) high X-Tower Osaka Bay was built near the Osaka Resort City.

The Osaka Resort City 200 was a subject of a series of lawsuits. In March 2001, the Osaka District Court ordered the city of Osaka to pay 63.7 billion yen to the banks which the complex was entrusted to, and which suffered financial losses due to the economic bubble burst and subsequent rent reductions, including Resona Bank, Sumitomo Mitsui Trust Bank, and The Bank of Tokyo-Mitsubishi UFJ. The city appealed to the court and no consensus was reached until March 2013, when it agreed to pay the banks a compensation of 64.5 billion yen.

== See also ==
- List of tallest structures in Osaka Prefecture
