= Minato-ku, Osaka =

Ward of Osaka, Japan

Coordinates: 34°39′50″N 135°27′39″E

Location of Minato-ku in Osaka City

Minato (港区, Minato-ku) is one of 24 wards of Osaka, Japan. It has an area of 7.9 km^{2}, and a population of 84,961. Literally translated, Minato-ku means "Harbor Ward".

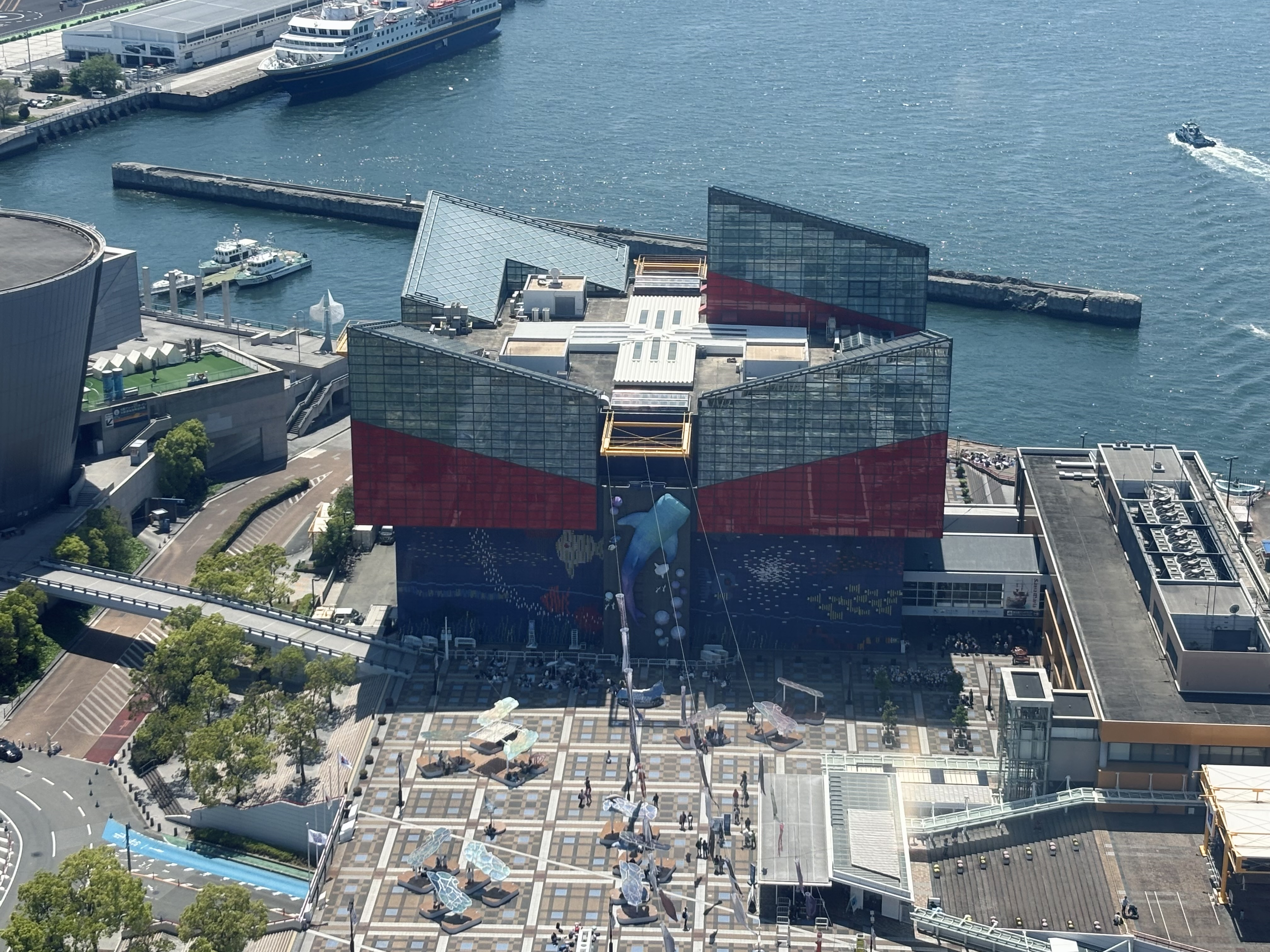
Kaiyukan aquarium

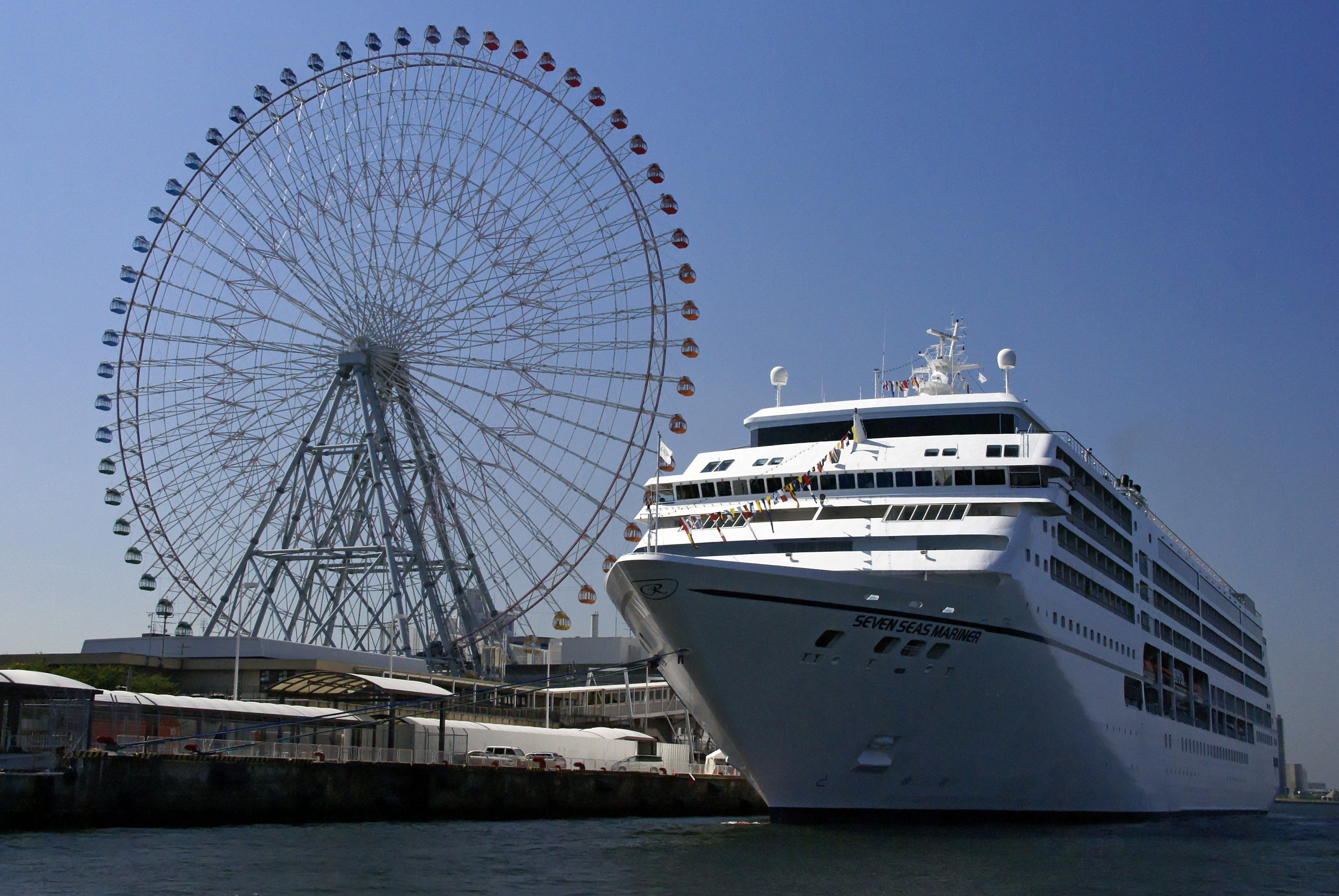
Kaiyukan Ferris wheel

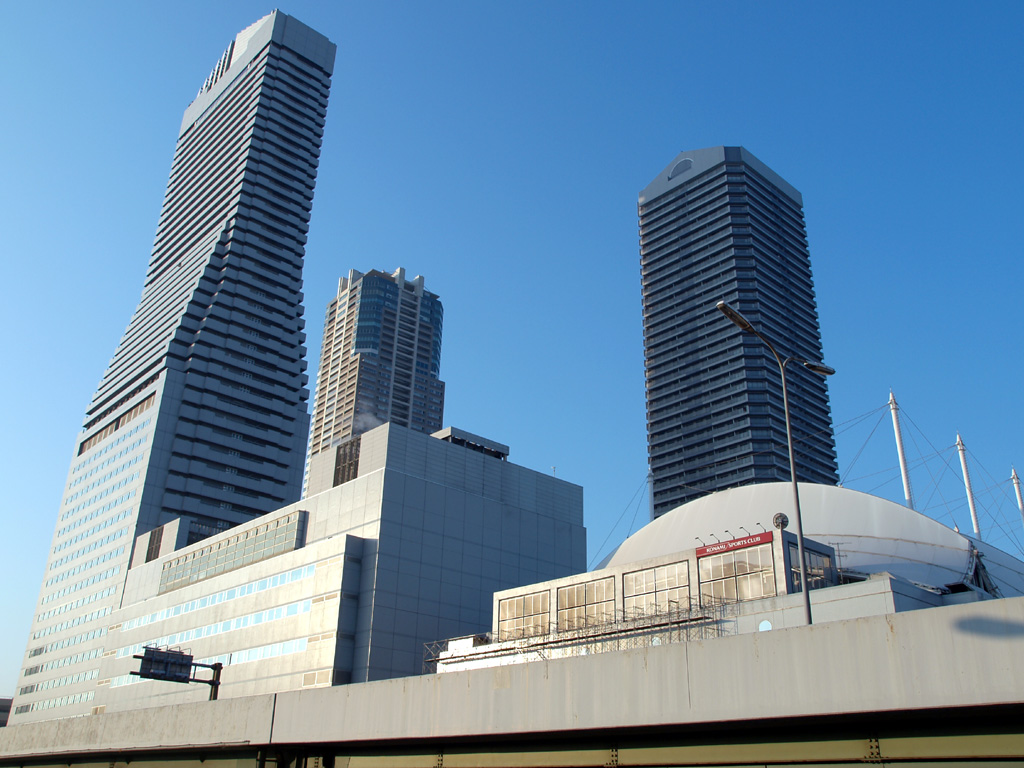
ORC 200 buildings

== Landmarks ==
- Kaiyukan (Osaka Aquarium)
- Port of Osaka
- Tempozan Harbor Village
- Modern Transportation Museum
- ORC 200

== Mass media ==
- Radio Osaka (ORC 200 Building, Benten)

== Train stations ==
West Japan Railway Company (JR West)
Osaka Loop Line

Bentencho Station

Osaka Metro
Chūō Line

Osakako Station - Asashiobashi Station - Bentencho Station

== Notable people from Minato-ku, Osaka ==
- Hideo Nomo, Japanese former baseball pitcher
- Kaori Kozai, Japanese enka singer
- Machiko Kyō, Japanese actress
- Ryōma Nishikawa, Japanese baseball player
- Tadao Ando, Japanese architect, Pritzker Prize winner
