= Ōmitsu Station =

Railway station in Tsu, Mie Prefecture, Japan

Ōmitsu Station 大三駅
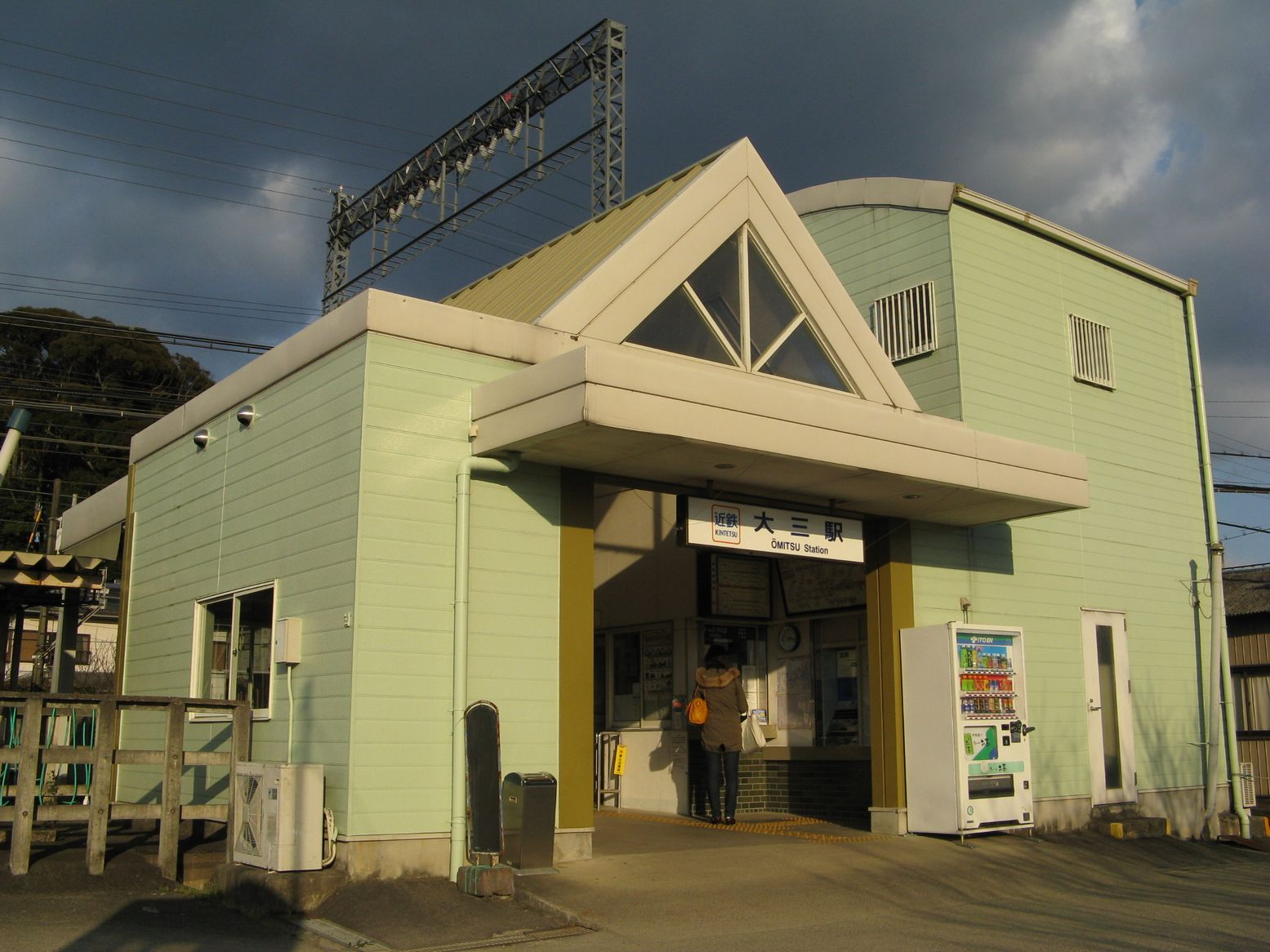
- Ōmitsu Station

General information
- Location: 815-1 Hakusen-cho Nihongi, Tsu-shi, Mie-ken 515-2602; Japan
- Coordinates: 34°39′50.64″N 136°22′6.24″E
- Operator: Kintetsu Railway
- Line: Osaka Line
- Distance: 97.6 km from Ōsaka Uehommachi
- Platforms: 2 side platforms

Other information
- Station code: D58
- Website: Official website

History
- Opened: November 19, 1930

Passengers
- FY2019: 237 daily
Location
- Location within Mie Prefecture Location within Japan

Ōmitsu Station (大三駅, Ōmitsu-eki) is a passenger railway station in located in the city of Tsu, Mie Prefecture, Japan, operated by the private railway operator Kintetsu Railway.

== Lines ==
Ōmitsu Station is served by the Osaka Line, and is located 97.6 rail kilometers from the starting point of the line at Ōsaka Uehommachi Station.

== Station layout ==
The station was consists of two opposed side platforms, connected by a level crossing. The station is unattended.

=== Platforms ===
| 1 | ■ Osaka Line | for Ise-Nakagawa, Kashikojima, and Nagoya |
| 2 | ■ Osaka Line | for Higashi-Aoyama and Nabari |

== Adjacent stations ==
| « | Service | » |
Osaka Line
| Sakakibara-Onsenguchi | Local | Ise-Ishibashi |
Express: Does not stop at this station
Rapid Express: Does not stop at this station

== History ==
Ōmitsu Station opened on November 19, 1930 as a station on the Sangu Express Electric Railway. After merging with Osaka Electric Kido on March 15, 1941, the line became the Kansai Express Railway's Osaka Line. This line was merged with the Nankai Electric Railway on June 1, 1944 to form Kintetsu.

== Passenger statistics ==
In fiscal 2019, the station was used by an average of 237 passengers daily (boarding passengers only).

== Surrounding area ==
- Japan National Route 165

== See also ==
- List of railway stations in Japan
