= Yamato-Asakura Station =

Railway station in Sakurai, Nara Prefecture, Japan

Yamato Asakura Station 大和朝倉駅
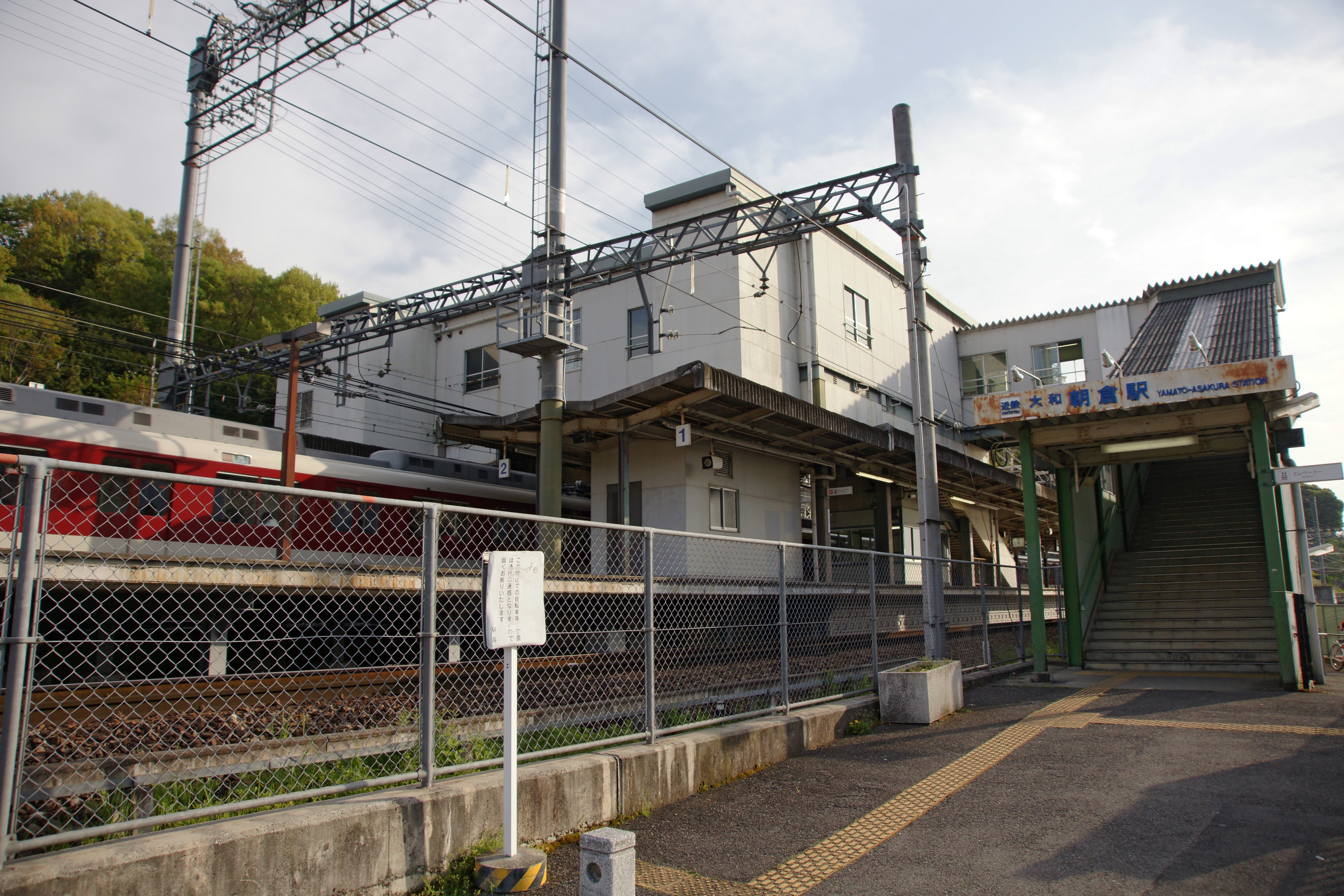
- Yamato-Asakura Station in April 2009

General information
- Location: 1029, Ōaza Jionji, Sakurai, Nara-ken 633-0017; Japan
- Coordinates: 34°30′58″N 135°52′09″E
- System: Kintetsu Railway commuter rail station
- Owner: Kintetsu Railway
- Operator: Kintetsu Railway
- Line: Osaka Line
- Distance: 41.9 km (26.0 miles) from Ōsaka Uehommachi
- Platforms: 2 island platforms
- Tracks: 4
- Connections: Bus stop

Other information
- Station code: D43
- Website: Official website

History
- Opened: 3 November 1944

Passengers
- 2019: 1114 daily

Services
| Preceding station | Kintetsu Railway | Following station |
|---|---|---|
| Sakurai towards Osaka Uehommachi | Osaka Line Local Suburban Semi-Express Semi-Express Express | Hasedera towards Ise-Nakagawa |
Location
- Location within Nara Prefecture Location within Japan

Yamato-Asakura Station (大和朝倉駅, Yamato-Asakura-eki) is a passenger railway station located in the city of Sakurai, Nara Prefecture, Japan. It is operated by the private transportation company, Kintetsu Railway.

== Line ==
Yamato-Asakura Station is served by the Osaka Line and is 41.9 kilometers from the starting point of the line at Ōsaka Uehommachi.

== Layout ==
The station is an above-ground station with a two island platform serving four tracks with an elevated station building. The effective length of the platform is for six cars. There is only one ticket gate. There are entrances on both the north and south sides, and the entrance on the south side is at the same height as the elevated station building.

=== Platforms ===
| 1, 2 | ■ Osaka Line | for Nabari, Ise-Nakagawa, Kashikojima and Nagoya |
| 3, 4 | ■ Osaka Line | for Yamato-Yagi, Osaka Uehonmachi and Osaka Namba |

== History ==
Yamato-Asakura Station opened on 3 November 1944. This line was merged with the Nankai Electric Railway on 1 June 1944 to form Kintetsu.

== Passenger statistics ==
In fiscal 2019, the station was used by an average of 1114 passengers daily (boarding passengers only).

== Surrounding area ==
- Kintetsu Asakuradai Residential Area
- Sakurai City Asakura Elementary School
- Japan National Route 165
- Japan National Route 166

== See also ==
- List of railway stations in Japan
