= Ise-Ishibashi Station =

Railway station in Tsu, Mie Prefecture, Japan

Ise-Ishibashi Station 伊勢石橋駅
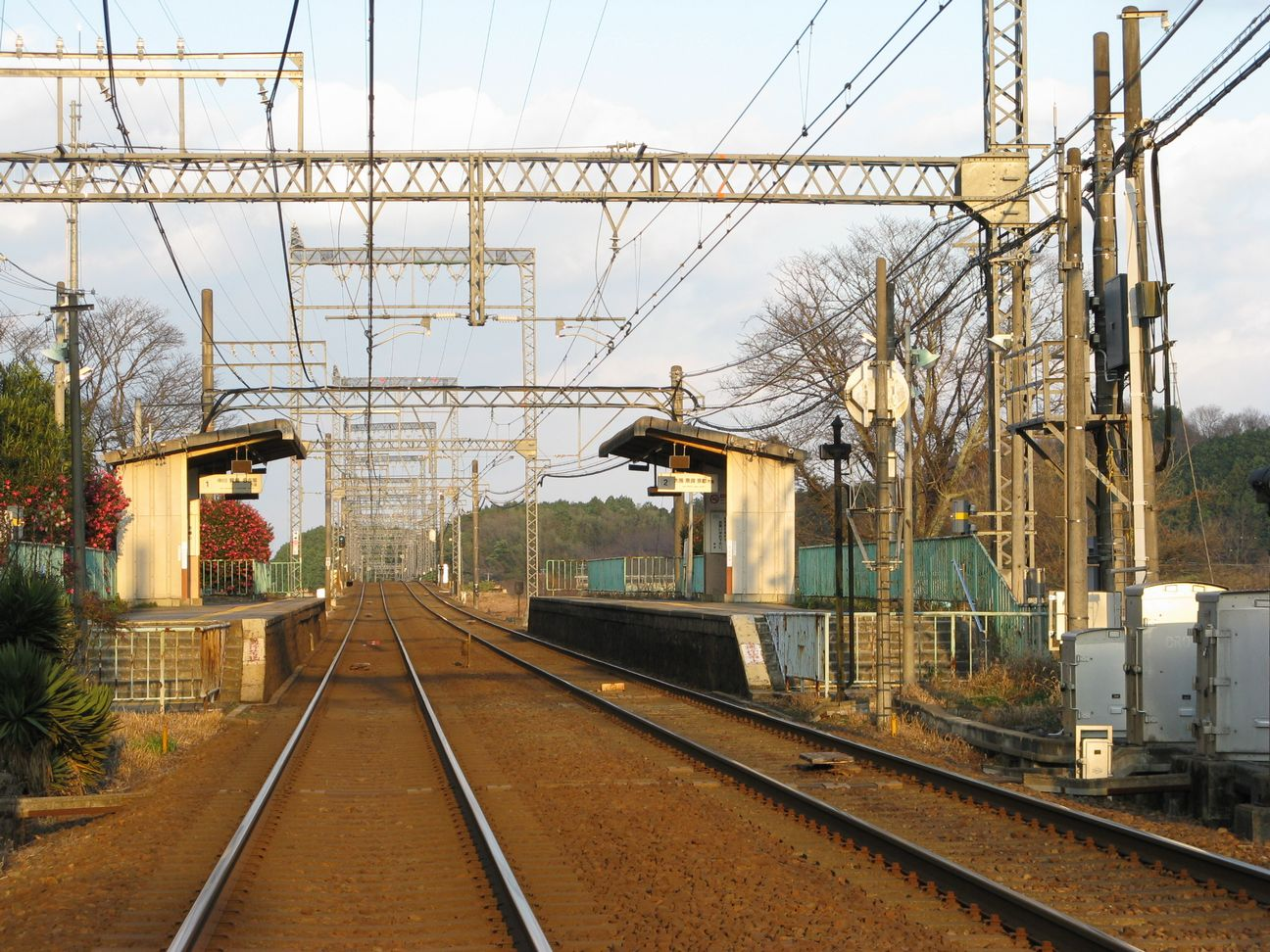
- Ise-Ishibashi Station

General information
- Location: 522-1 Ichishi-cho Ōnoki, Tsu-shi, Mie-ken 515-2524; Japan
- Coordinates: 34.6570°N 136.4082°E
- Operator: Kintetsu Railway
- Line: Osaka Line
- Distance: 101.6 km from Ōsaka Uehommachi
- Platforms: 2 side platforms

Other information
- Station code: D59
- Website: Official website

History
- Opened: November 19, 1930
- Former names: Sangū-Ishibashi (until 1941)

Passengers
- FY2019: 49 daily
Location
- Location within Mie Prefecture Location within Japan

Ise-Ishibashi Station (伊勢石橋駅, Ise-Ishibashi-eki) is a passenger railway station in located in the city of Tsu, Mie Prefecture, Japan, operated by the private railway operator Kintetsu Railway.

== Lines ==
Ise-Ishibashi Station is served by the Osaka Line, and is located 101.6 rail kilometers from the starting point of the line at Ōsaka Uehommachi Station.

== Station layout ==
The station was consists of two opposed side platforms, connected by a level crossing. The station is unattended.

=== Platforms ===
1	■ Osaka Line	for Ise-Nakagawa, Kashikojima, and Nagoya
2	■ Osaka Line	for Higashi-Aoyama and Nabari

== Adjacent stations ==
«	Service	»
Osaka Line
Ōmitsu	Local	Kawai-Takaoka
Express: Does not stop at this station
Rapid Express: Does not stop at this station

== History ==
Ise-Ishibashi Station opened on November 19, 1930 as Sangū-Ishibashi Station (参急石橋駅, Sangū Ishibashi-eki) on the Sangu Express Electric Railway. After merging with Osaka Electric Kido on March 15, 1941, the line became the Kansai Express Railway's Osaka Line. The station was renamed to its present name at that time. This line was merged with the Nankai Electric Railway on June 1, 1944 to form Kintetsu.

== Passenger statistics ==
In fiscal 2019, the station was used by an average of 49 passengers daily (boarding passengers only).

== Surrounding area ==
- Kumozu River.
- Tsu Municipal Kuriha Elementary School

== See also ==
- List of railway stations in Japan
