= Nishi-Aoyama Station =

Railway station in Iga, Mie Prefecture, Japan

Nishi-Aoyama Station 西青山駅
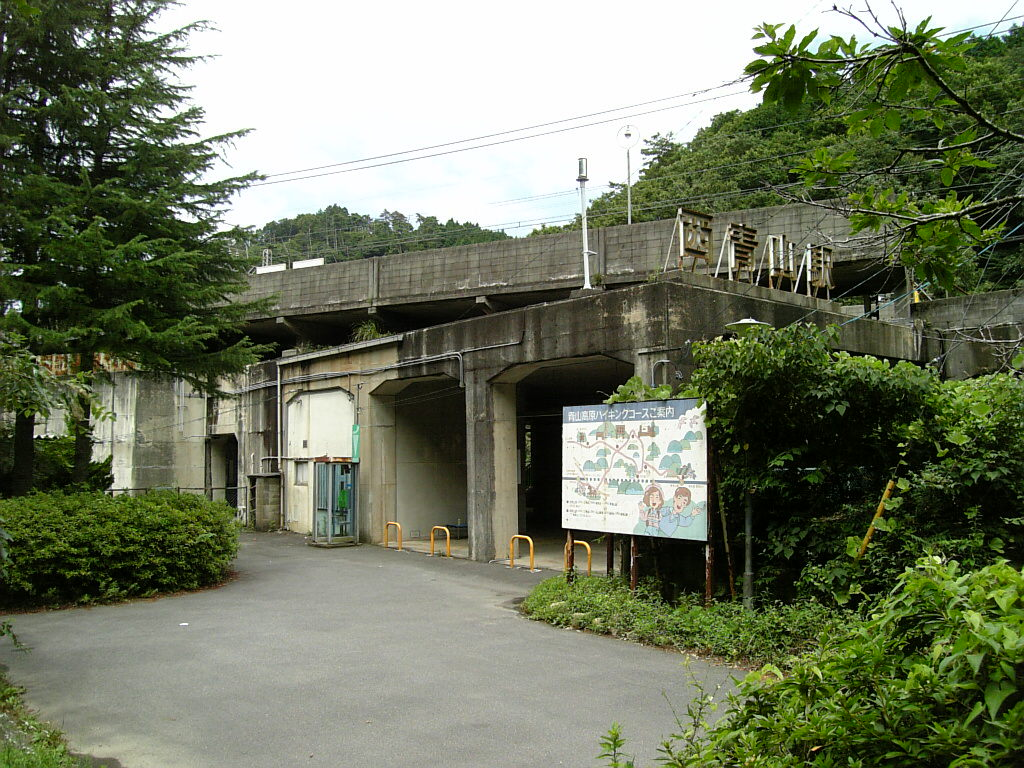
- Nishi-Aoyama Station, August 2007

General information
- Location: 1353-4 Aoyama, Iga-shi, Mie-ken 518-0205; Japan
- Coordinates: 34.6763°N 136.2378°E
- Operator: Kintetsu Railway
- Line: Osaka Line
- Distance: 83.8 km from Ōsaka Uehommachi
- Platforms: 2 side platforms

Other information
- Station code: D55
- Website: Official website

History
- Opened: December 20, 1930

Passengers
- FY2019: 26 daily

Services
Preceding station	Kintetsu Railway	Following station
Iga-Kōzu towards Osaka Uehommachi	Osaka Line Local Express	Higashi-Aoyama towards Ise-Nakagawa
Location
- Location within Mie Prefecture Location within Japan

Nishi-Aoyama Station (西青山駅, Nishi-Aoyama-eki) is a passenger railway station in located in the city of Iga, Mie Prefecture, Japan, operated by the private railway operator Kintetsu Railway.

== Lines ==
Nishi-Aoyama Station is served by the Osaka Line, and is located 83.8 rail kilometers from the starting point of the line at Ōsaka Uehommachi Station.

== Station layout ==
The station consists of two elevated opposed island platforms, with the station building underneath. The station is unattended.

=== Platforms ===
1	■ Osaka Line	for Ise-Nakagawa, Ujiyamada, Kashikojima, and Nagoya
2	■ Osaka Line	for Nabari, Yamato-Yagi and Osaka Uehommachi

== History ==
Nishi-Aoyama Station opened on December 20, 1930, as a station on the Sangu Express Electric Railway. After merging with Osaka Electric Kido on March 15, 1941, the line became the Kansai Express Railway's Osaka Line. This line was merged with the Nankai Electric Railway on June 1, 1944, to form Kintetsu. The station has been unattended since 1997.

== Passenger statistics ==
In fiscal 2019, the station was used by an average of 26 passengers daily (boarding passengers only).

== Surrounding area ==
- Aoyama Highlands
- Japan National Route 126

== See also ==
- List of railway stations in Japan
