= Kawai-Takaoka Station =

Railway station in Tsu, Mie Prefecture, Japan

Kawai-Takaoka Station 川合高岡駅
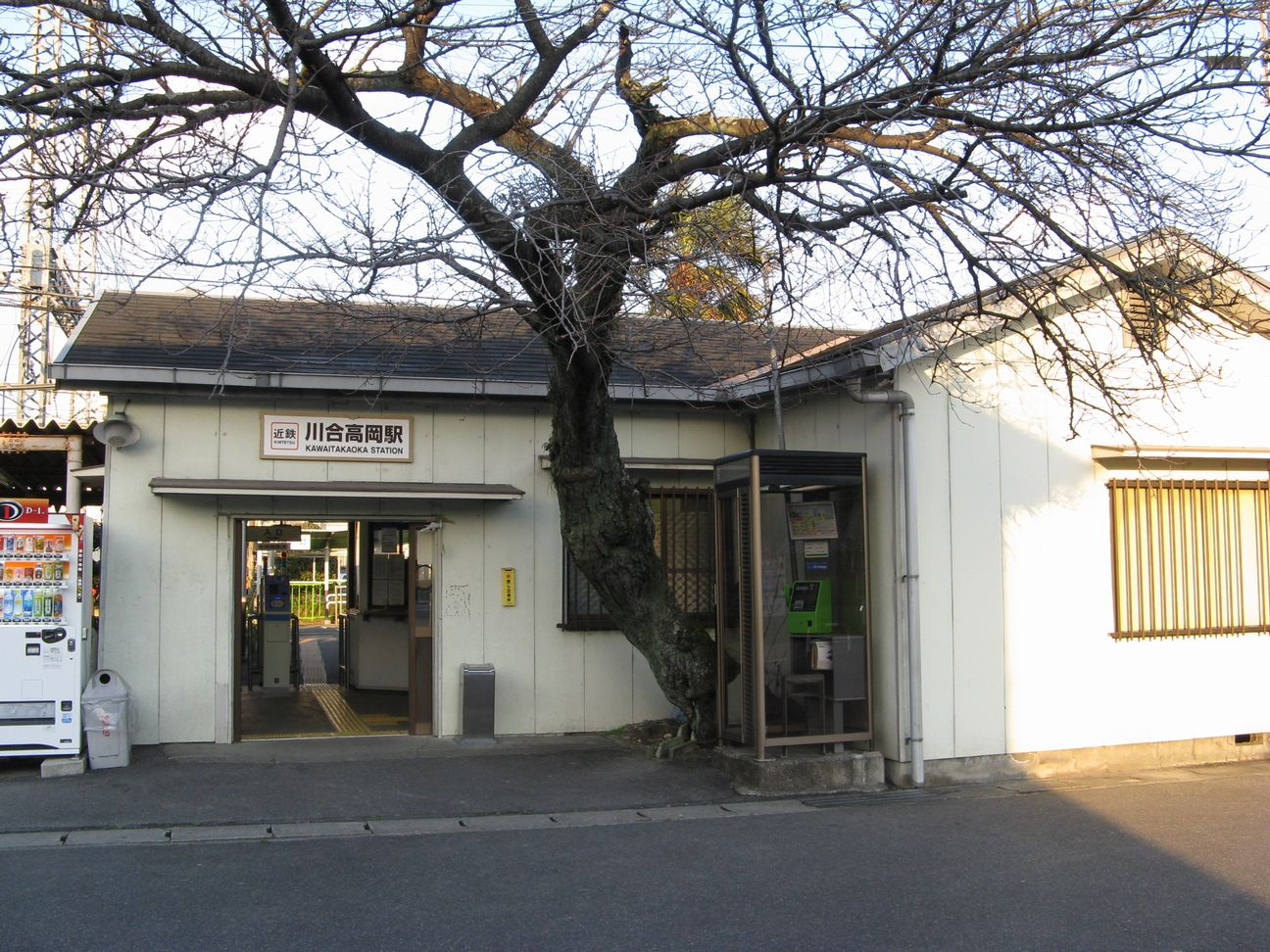
- Kawai-Takaoka Station

General information
- Location: 98-2 Tajiri, Ichishi-cho, Tsu-shi, Mie-ken 515-2515; Japan
- Coordinates: 34.6565°N 136.4365°E
- Operator: Kintetsu Railway
- Line: Osaka Line
- Distance: 104.4 km from Ōsaka Uehommachi
- Platforms: 2 side platforms

Other information
- Station code: D60
- Website: Official website

History
- Opened: November 19, 1930

Passengers
- FY2019: 686 daily
Location
- Location within Mie Prefecture Location within Japan

Kawai-Takaoka Station (川合高岡駅, Kawai-Takaoka-eki) is a passenger railway station in located in the city of Tsu, Mie Prefecture, Japan, operated by the private railway operator Kintetsu Railway.

== Lines ==
Kawai-Takaoka Station is served by the Osaka Line, and is located 104.4 rail kilometers from the starting point of the line at Ōsaka Uehommachi Station.

== Station layout ==
The station was consists of two opposed side platforms, connected by a level crossing. The station is unattended.

=== Platforms ===
1	■ Osaka Line	for Ise-Nakagawa, Ujiyamada, Kashikojima, and Nagoya
2	■ Osaka Line	for Higashi-Aoyama andNabari

== Adjacent stations ==
«	Service	»
Osaka Line
Ise-Ishibashi	Local	Ise-Nakagawa
Express: Does not stop at this station
Rapid Express: Does not stop at this station

== History ==
Kawaitakaoka Station opened on November 19, 1930 as a station on the Sangu Express Electric Railway. After merging with Osaka Electric Kido on March 15, 1941, the line became the Kansai Express Railway's Osaka Line. This line was merged with the Nankai Electric Railway on June 1, 1944 to form Kintetsu.

== Passenger statistics ==
In fiscal 2019, the station was used by an average of 686 passengers daily (boarding passengers only).

== Surrounding area ==
- Ichishi Station of the Meishō Line.
- Tsu City Kazushi Junior High School
- Tsu City Takaoka Elementary School
- former Ichishi Town Hall

== See also ==
- List of railway stations in Japan
