= Sakakibara-Onsenguchi Station =

Railway station in Tsu, Mie Prefecture, Japan

Sakakibara-Onsenguchi Station 榊原温泉口駅
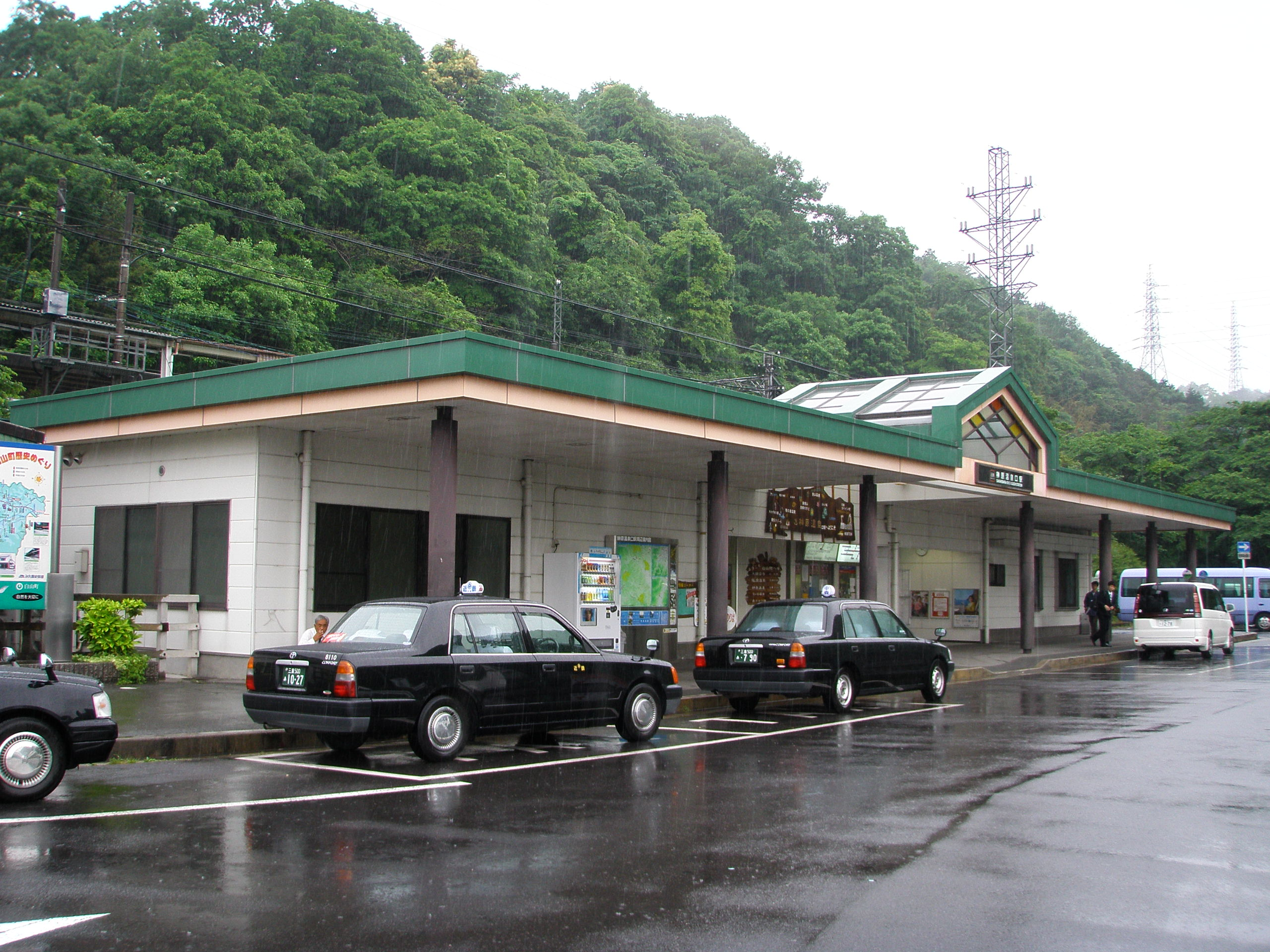
- Sakakibara-Onsenguchi Station

General information
- Location: 1526-2 Hakusen-cho Sada, Tsu-shi, Mie-ken 515-2621; Japan
- Coordinates: 34.6747°N 136.3487°E
- Operator: Kintetsu Railway
- Line: Osaka Line
- Distance: 95.4 km from Ōsaka Uehommachi
- Platforms: 2 side platforms

Other information
- Station code: D57
- Website: Official website

History
- Opened: November 19, 1930
- Former names: Sada (until 1965)

Passengers
- FY2019: 554 daily
Location
- Location within Mie Prefecture Location within Japan

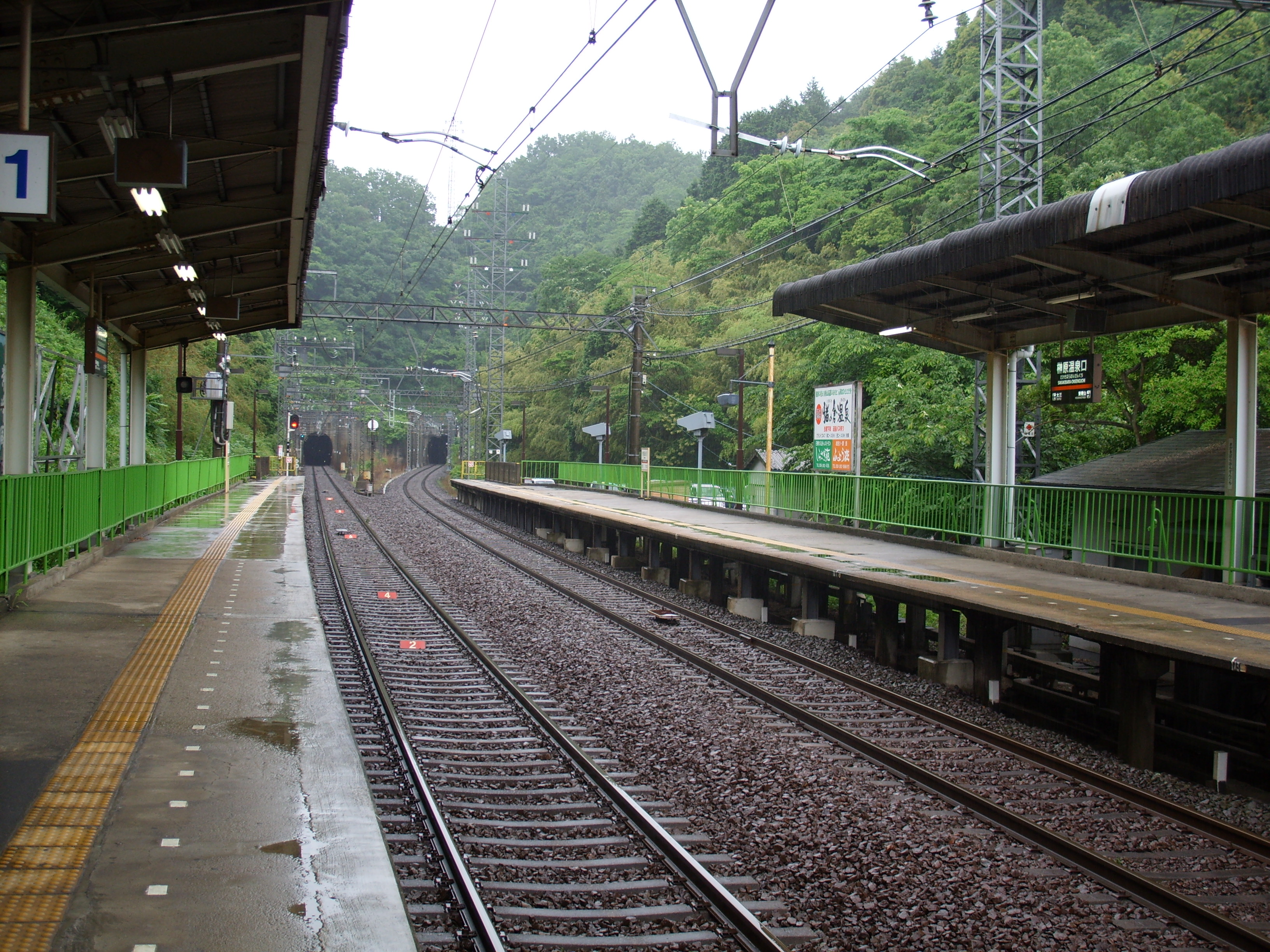
Platforms

Sakakibara-Onsenguchi Station (Japanese: 榊原温泉口駅, Hepburn: Sakakibara-Onsenguchi-eki) is a passenger railway station in located in the city of Tsu, Mie Prefecture, Japan, operated by the private railway operator Kintetsu Railway.

== Lines ==
Sakakibara-Onsenguchi Station is served by the Osaka Line, and is located 95.4 rail kilometers from the starting point of the line at Ōsaka Uehommachi Station.

== Station layout ==
The station was consists of two opposed side platforms. The station is built on the side of a hill, with the platforms at a higher elevation than the station building.

=== Platforms ===
1	■ Osaka Line	for Ise-Nakagawa, Ujiyamada, Kashikojima, and Nagoya
2	■ Osaka Line	for Nabari , Yamato-Yagi , Osaka Uehommachi and Osaka Namba

== Adjacent stations ==
«	Service	»
Osaka Line
Higashi-Aoyama	Local	Ōmitsu
Higashi-Aoyama	Express (including morning westbound trains to become rapid express trains at Nabari)	Ise-Nakagawa
Aoyamacho	Rapid Express (eastbond trains only)	Ise-Nakagawa

.

== History ==
Sakakibara-Onsenguchi Station opened on November 19, 1930, as Sada Station (佐田駅, Sada-eki) on the Sangu Express Electric Railway. After merging with Osaka Electric Kido on March 15, 1941, the line became the Kansai Express Railway's Osaka Line. This line was merged with the Nankai Electric Railway on June 1, 1944, to form Kintetsu. The station name was changed to its present name on March 1, 1965. On December 18, 1973, due to failure of an ATS system, a runaway train derailed in the Aoyama Tunnel near this station, with 25 fatalities.

== Passenger statistics ==
In fiscal 2019, the station was used by an average of 554 passengers daily (boarding passengers only).

== Surrounding area ==
- Sakakibara Onsen
- Hojuyama Daikannon-ji
- Louvre Sculpture Museum
- Tsu City Hakusan Folk Museum

== See also ==
- List of railway stations in Japan
