= Kintetsu Shimoda Station =

Railway station in Kashiba, Nara Prefecture, Japan

Kintetsu-Shimoda Station 近鉄下田駅
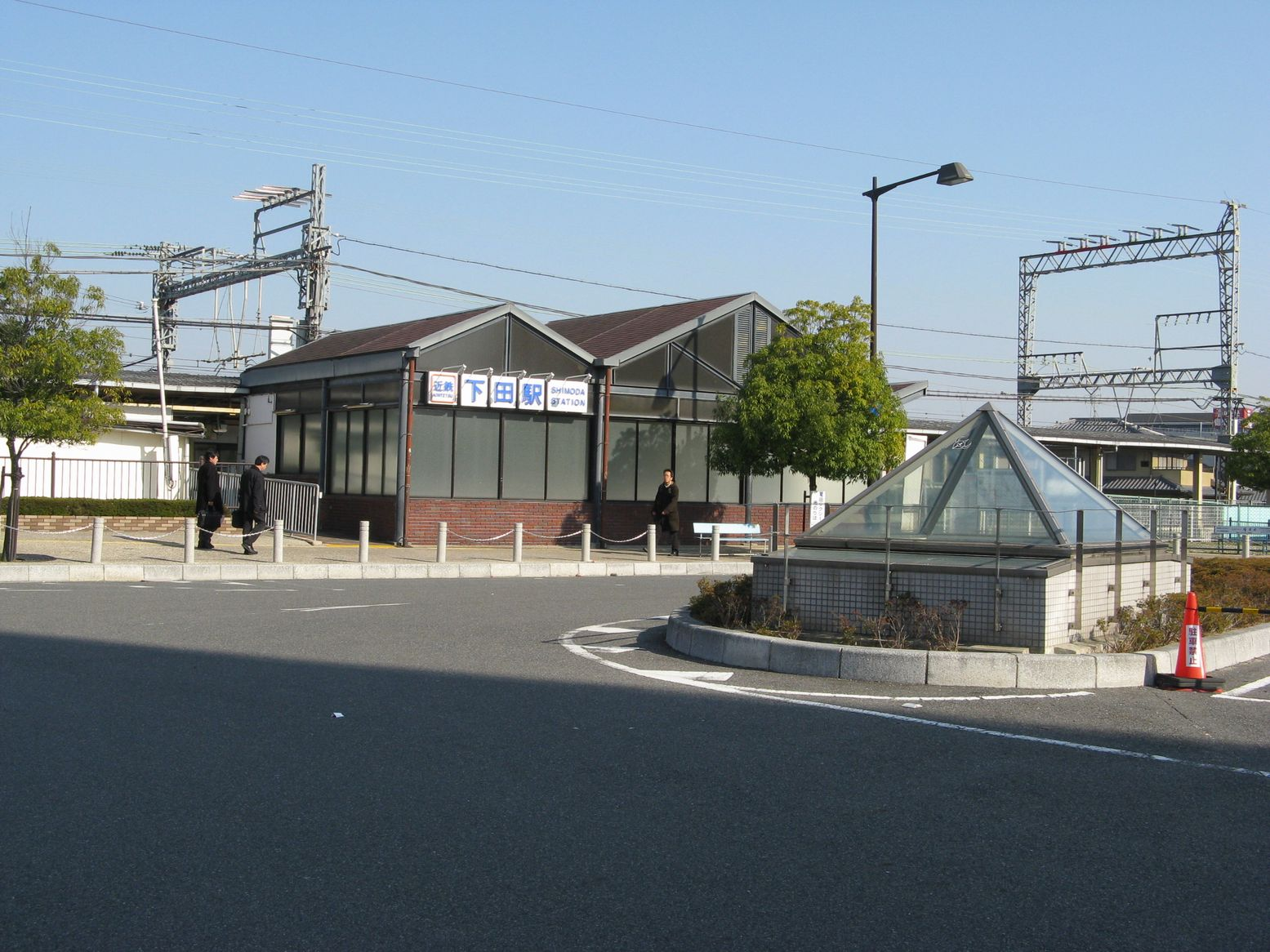
- Kintetsu-Shimoda Station

General information
- Location: 4 Chome Shimodanishi, Kashiba-shi, Nara-ken 639-0231; Japan
- Coordinates: 34°32′29.13″N 135°42′14.48″E
- System: Kintetsu Railway commuter rail station
- Owner: Kintetsu Railway
- Operator: Kintetsu Railway
- Line: D Osaka Line
- Distance: 25.7 km (16.0 miles) from Osaka Uehommachi
- Platforms: 2 side platforms
- Tracks: 2
- Train operators: Kintetsu Railway
- Connections: Bus terminal

Construction
- Cycle facilities: Available
- Accessible: Yes

Other information
- Station code: D22
- Website: www.kintetsu.co.jp/station/station_info/station02024.html

History
- Opened: 1 July 1927
- Former names: Shimoda (to 1944); Kinki Nippon Shimoda (to 1970)

Passengers
- FY2019: 2475 daily

Services
| Preceding station | Kintetsu Railway | Following station |
|---|---|---|
| Nijō towards Osaka Uehommachi | Osaka Line Local Semi-Express | Goidō towards Ise-Nakagawa |
Location

Kintetsu-Shimoda Station (近鉄下田駅, Kintetsu-Shimoda-eki) is a passenger railway station located in the city of Kashiba, Nara Prefecture, Japan. It is operated by the private transportation company, Kintetsu Railway.

== Line ==
Kintetsu-Shimoda Station is served by the Osaka Line and is 25.7 kilometers from the starting point of the line at Ōsaka Uehommachi.

== Layout ==
The station is an above-ground station with two opposed side platforms and two tracks. The ticket gates and concourse are underground, while the platforms are above ground. There are entrances on both the north and south sides. The effective length of the platform is six cars. The station is unattended.

== Platforms ==
| 1 | ■ D Osaka Line | for Goido, Yamato-Yagi, and Nabari |
| 2 | ■ D Osaka Line | for Kawachi-Kokubu, and Osaka Uehommachi |

== History ==
The station was opened as Shimoda Station (下田駅) on 1 July 1927 as a station on the Osaka Electric Tramway Yagi Line. It became a Kansai Express Railway station due to a company merger with Sangu Express Railway on 15 March 1941, and through a subsequent merger became a station on the Kintetsu Railway on 1 July 1944. It was renamed Kinki Nippon Shimoda Station (近畿日本下田駅) at that time, but the name was changed to its present name on 1 March 1970.

== Passenger statistics ==
In fiscal 2019 the station was used by an average of 2475 passengers daily (boarding passengers only).

== Surrounding area ==
- Kashiba City Hall
- Kashiba City Kashiba Junior High School
- Kashiba City Shimoda Elementary School

== See also ==
- List of railway stations in Japan
