= Masuga Station =

Railway station in Kashihara, Nara Prefecture, Japan

Masuga Station 真菅駅
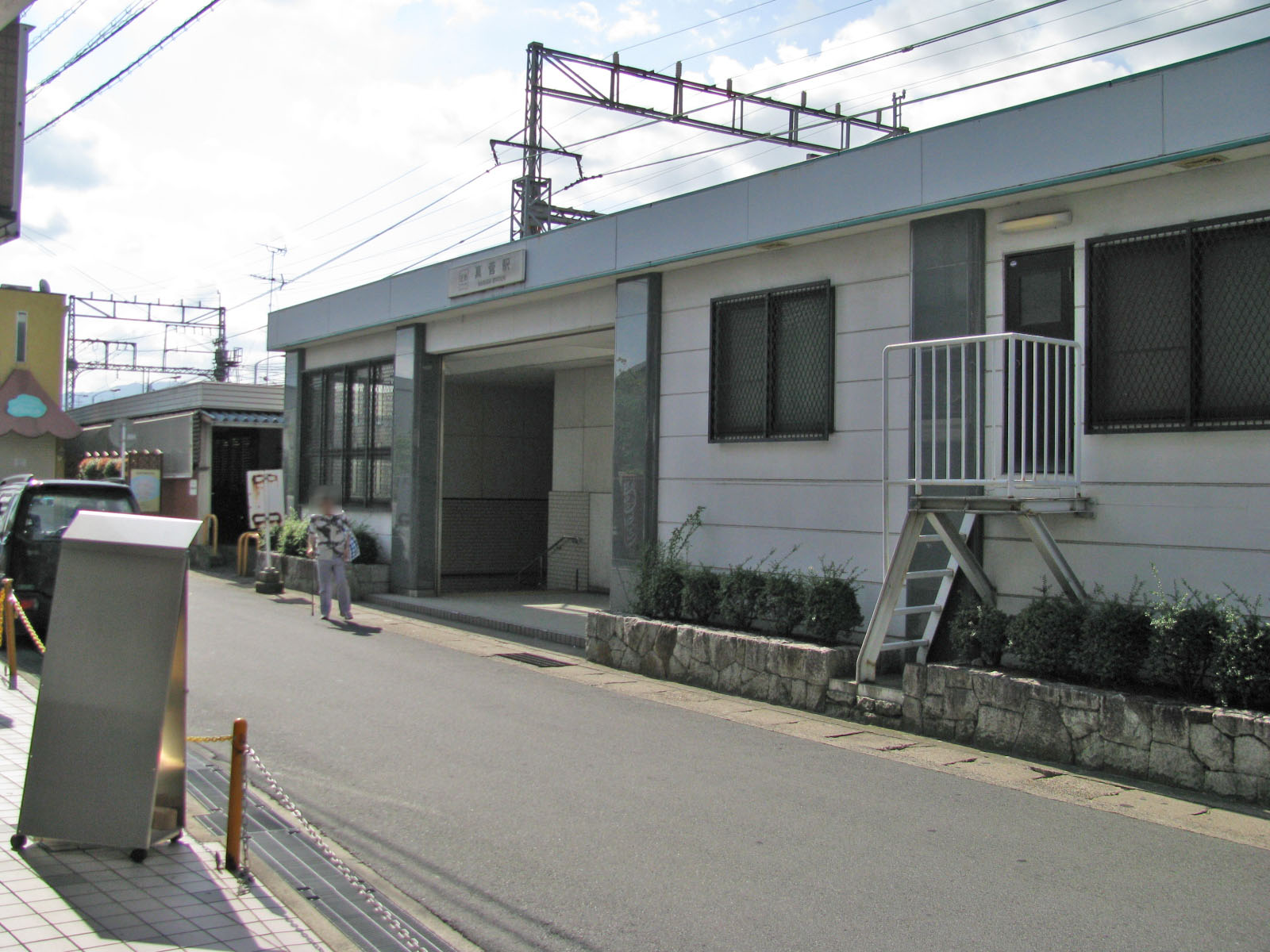
- Masuga Station

General information
- Location: 1070 Sogacho, Kashihara-shi, Nara-ken 634-0831; Japan
- Coordinates: 34°31′10.26″N 135°46′21.5″E
- System: Kintetsu Railway commuter rail station
- Owner: Kintetsu Railway
- Operator: Kintetsu Railway
- Line: D Osaka Line
- Distance: 32.8 km (20.4 miles) from Osaka Uehommachi
- Platforms: 2 side platforms
- Tracks: 2
- Train operators: Kintetsu Railway
- Connections: Bus terminal

Construction
- Cycle facilities: Available
- Accessible: Yes

Other information
- Station code: D27
- Website: www.kintetsu.co.jp/station/station_info/station02029.html

History
- Opened: 21 March 1925

Passengers
- FY2019: 2507 daily

Services
| Preceding station | Kintetsu Railway | Following station |
|---|---|---|
| Matsuzuka towards Osaka Uehommachi | Osaka Line Local Semi-Express | Yamato-Yagi towards Ise-Nakagawa |
Location

Masuga Station (真菅駅, Masuga-eki) is a passenger railway station located in the city of Kashihara, Nara Prefecture, Japan. It is operated by the private transportation company, Kintetsu Railway.

== Line ==
Masuga Station is served by the Osaka Line and is 32.8 kilometers from the starting point of the line at Ōsaka Uehommachi.

== Layout ==
The station is an above-ground station with two opposed side platforms and two tracks. The ticket gates and concourse are underground, while the platforms are above ground, and there are elevators connecting each platform to the underground concourse. The effective length of the platform is six cars.. The station is unattended.

== Platforms ==
| 1 | ■ D Osaka Line | for Nabari |
| 2 | ■ D Osaka Line | for Osaka Uehommachi |

== History ==
Masuga Station was opened 21 March 1925 as a station on the Osaka Electric Tramway Yagi Line. It became a Kansai Express Railway station due to a company merger with Sangu Express Railway on 15 March 1941, and through a subsequent merger became a station on the Kintetsu Railway on 1 July 1944.

== Passenger statistics ==
In fiscal 2019 the station was used by an average of 2507 passengers daily (boarding passengers only).

== Surrounding area ==
- Sogaza Soga Tohiko Shrinel

== See also ==
- List of railway stations in Japan
