= Matsuzuka Station =

Railway station in Yamatotakada, Nara Prefecture, Japan

Matsuzuka Station 松塚駅
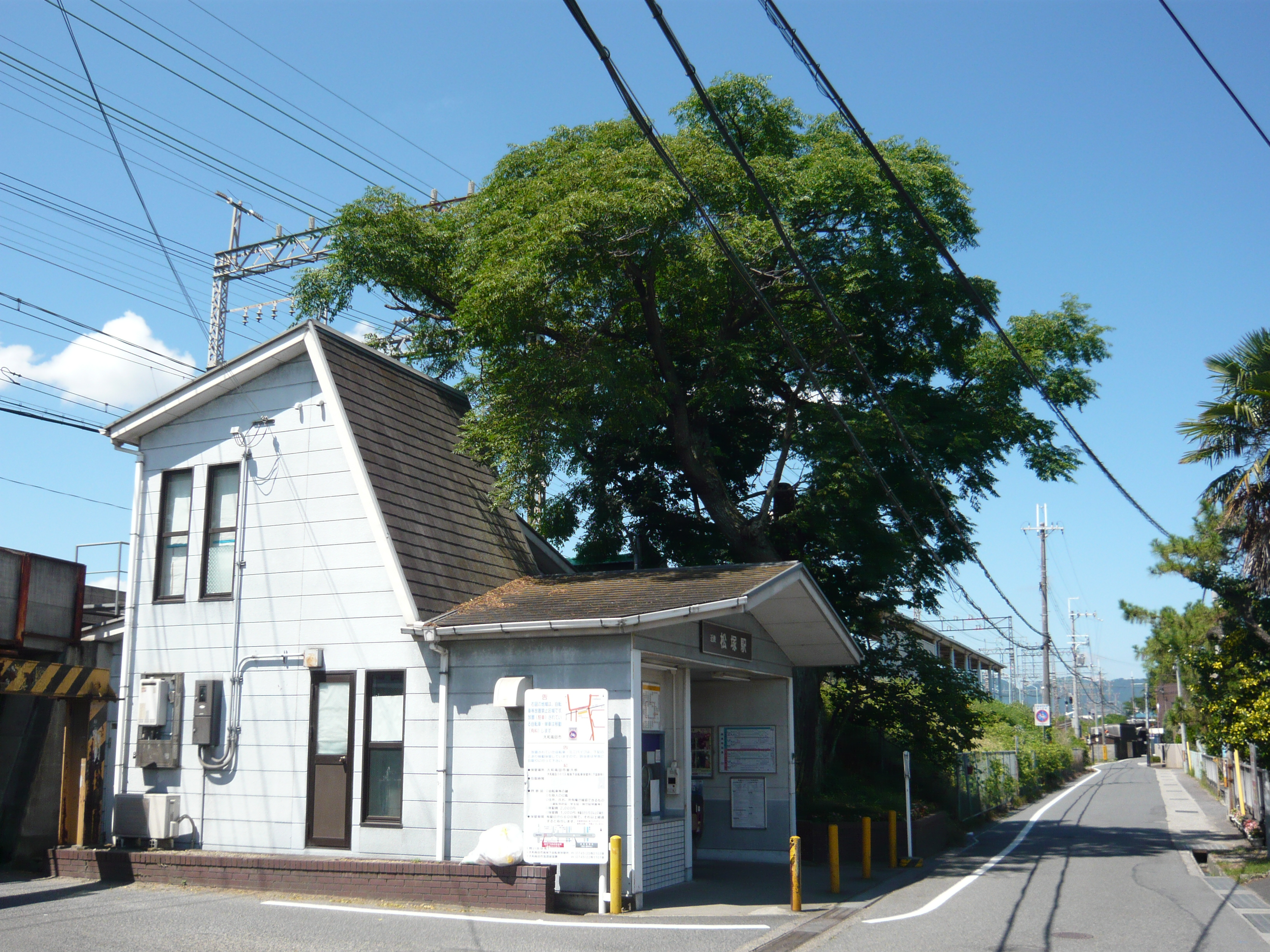
- Matsuzuka Station in July 2011

General information
- Location: 24-2 Matsuzuka, Yamatotakada-shi, Nara-ken 635-0001; Japan
- Coordinates: 34.5207°N 135.7616°E
- Operator: Kintetsu Railway
- Line: D Osaka Line
- Distance: 31.8 km from Osaka-Uehommachi
- Platforms: 2 side platforms
- Tracks: 2

Other information
- Status: Unattended
- Station code: D26
- Website: Official website

History
- Opened: 21 March 1925

Passengers
- FY2019: 596 daily

Services
Preceding station	Kintetsu Railway	Following station
Yamato-Takada towards Osaka Uehommachi	Osaka Line Local Semi-Express	Masuga towards Ise-Nakagawa
Location
- Location within Nara Prefecture Location within Japan

Matsuzuka Station (松塚駅, Matsuzuka-eki) is a passenger railway station located in the city of Yamatotakada, Nara Prefecture, Japan. It is operated by the private transportation company, Kintetsu Railway.

== Line ==
Matsuzuka Station is served by the Osaka Line and is 31.8 kilometers from the starting point of the line at Osaka-Uehommachi.

== Layout ==
The station has two opposed side platforms on an embankment and two tracks. The station building (ticket gates) is located on the platform 1 side, closer to Yamato-Yagi. There is only one ticket gate. The effective length of the platform is 6 cars. There is no waiting room. The station is unattended.

=== Platforms ===
1	■ Osaka Line	for Yamato-Yagi, Haibara, and Nabari
2	■ Osaka Line	for Yamato-Takada, Fuse, and Osaka Uehommachi

== History ==
Matsuzuka Station opened on 21 March 1925 on the Osaka Electric Tramway Yagi Line (now the Osaka Line) between Onji and Yamato-Yagi. On 15 March 1941, the line merged with the Sangu Express Railway and became the Kansai Express Railway's Osaka Line. This line was merged with the Nankai Electric Railway on 1 June 1944 to form Kintetsu.

== Passenger statistics ==
In fiscal 2019, the station was used by an average of 596 passengers daily (boarding passengers only).

== Surrounding area ==
- Soga River
- Katsuragi River

== See also ==
- List of railway stations in Japan
