= Osaka Line =

Railway line in Japan

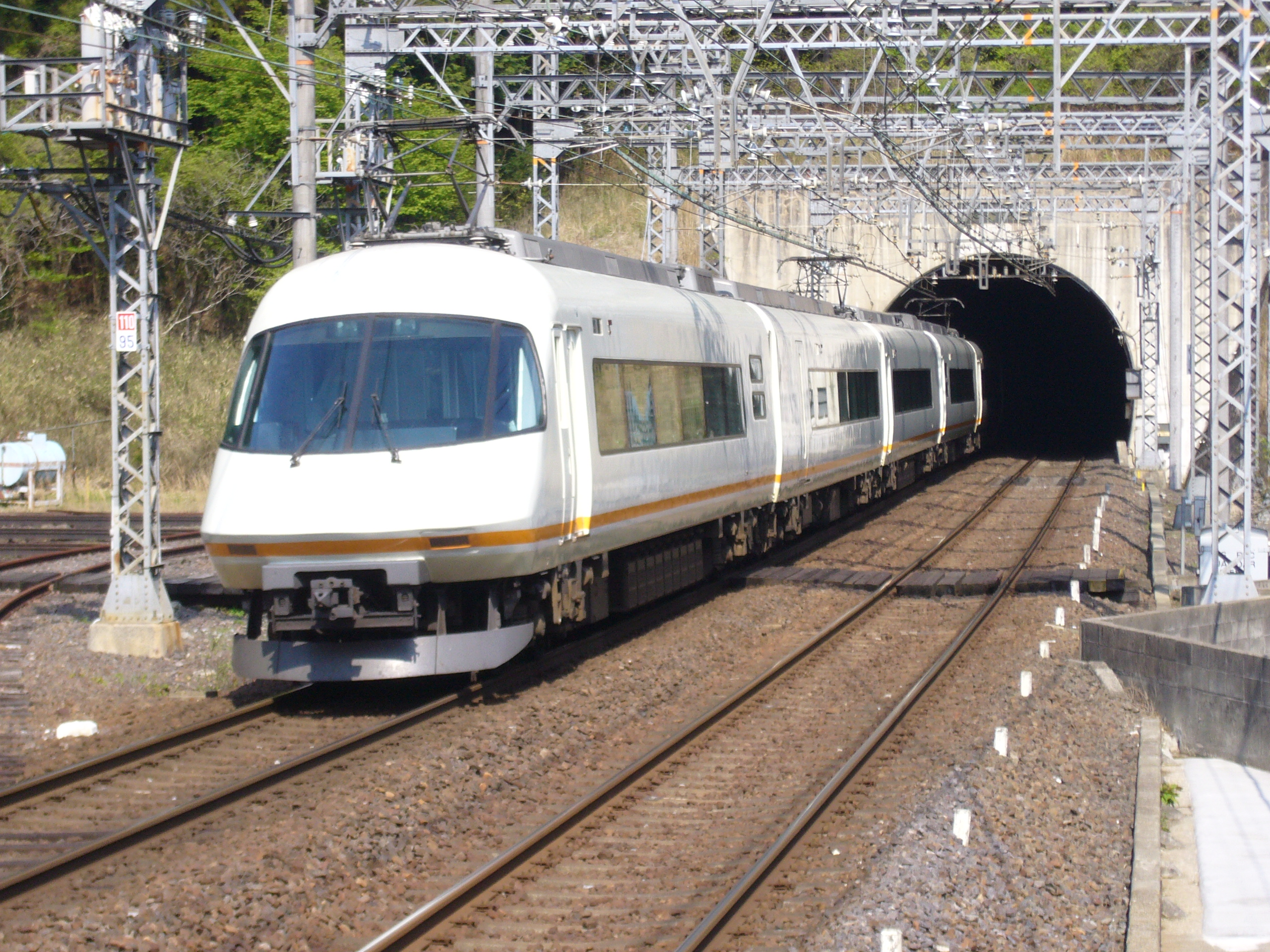
- 21000 series EMU on a limited express service passing New Aoyama Tunnel

Overview
- Owner: Kintetsu Railway
- Line number: D
- Locale: Kansai (Osaka, Nara and Mie Prefectures
- Termini: Osaka Uehommachi; Ise-Nakagawa
- Stations: 48

Service
- Type: Commuter rail Intercity rail
- Operator(s): Kintetsu Railway
- Depot(s): Takayasu (Branch: Goido, Nabari, Aoyamacho); Goido (workshop)

History
- Opened: 30 April 1914; 111 years ago

Technical
- Line length: 108.9 km (67.7 mi)
- Track length: 107.6 km (66.9 mi)
- Track gauge: 1,435 mm (4 ft 8 1/2 in) standard gauge
- Minimum radius: 400 m (1,300 ft)
- Electrification: 1,500 V DC (overhead line)
- Operating speed: 130 km/h (80 mph) (some limited express trains); 120 km/h (75 mph) (limited express trains); 110 km/h (70 mph) (other trains)
- Signalling: Automatic closing block
- Train protection system: Kintetsu ATS, ATS-SP
- Maximum incline: 3.56%

The Osaka Line (大阪線, Ōsaka-sen) is a railway line in Japan owned by Kintetsu Railway, connecting Osaka and Mie Prefecture via Nara Prefecture. The line is the longest double-tracked railway of non-JR operators. Together with the Nagoya Line, this line forms the route for Kintetsu limited express services connecting Osaka and Nagoya in competition with the Tokaido Shinkansen.

== Services ==
Along with limited express trains, local and express services are operated on the line.

Local (普通, Futsū) (L)
Mostly using 6-car trains, operations are divided at Nabari. In the west trains normally run between Osaka Uehommachi and Takayasu or Kawachi-Kokubu. During the day, 6 trains operate per hour, 5 between Osaka Uehommachi and Takayasu, and one between Osaka Uehommachi and Kawachi-Kokubu. In the east, local trains run between Nabari or Aoyamacho and Ise-Nakagawa. Some trains continues as other train types west of Nabari.
Suburban Semi-Express (区間準急, Kukan Junkyū) (SSE)
The service started on March 20, 2012. These operate using 6-car trains, between Osaka Uehommachi and Yamato-Asakura, Haibara, or Nabari, during off-peak hours.
Semi-Express (準急, Junkyū) (SE)
Between Osaka Uehommachi and Takayasu, Haibara or Nabari, peak hours only, replacing suburban semi-express services, using 10-, 8-, or 6-car formations.
Suburban Express (区間急行, Kukan Kyūkō) (SuEx)
The service started on March 14, 2026. These operate the same stopping pattern as Express trains but additionally stop at Kintetsu Yao, Kawachi-Yamamoto, and Takayasu, and operate between Osaka Uehommachi and Haibara, Nabari, or Aoyamachō, during off-peak hours.
Express (急行, Kyūkō) (Ex)
Operated at all times except during rush hours in the peak direction, connecting Osaka Uehommachi and Aoyamachō or Isuzugawa on Toba Line, one and two services per hour respectively. These trains use short 6-car formations due to the lengths of platforms at Kawachi-Kokubu and Sambommatsu. Makes a connection to express train on Nagoya Line at Ise-Nakagawa.
Rapid Express (快速急行, Kaisoku Kyūkō) (RE)
Long distance rapid service replacing express trains at rush hours, between Osaka Uehommachi and Aoyamachō, or Matsusaka, Ujiyamada, Isuzugawa or Toba on Toba Line in Mie Prefecture. To the west of Nabari, they operate with up to 10 cars, to the west of Aoyamachō with up to 8 cars, and 4 or 6 cars in the eastern section.
After the schedule change on March 20, 2012, these trains were integrated with suburban rapid express trains (区間快速急行, 区間快速, Kukan Kaisoku Kyūkō, Kukan Kaisoku). Muroguchi-Ono and Akameguchi stations became stops of rapid express trains, but Iga-Kozu, Nishi-Aoyama, and Higashi-Aoyama stations are skipped.
After the schedule change on March 14, 2020, morning westbound trains are shortened between Aoyamacho and Osaka Uehommachi, and trains from the Yamada Line and the Toba Line are operated as express trains until Nabari. A timetable revision scheduled for 16 March 2024 looks to mark the end of operation with 10-car trains.
Limited Express (特急, Tokkyū)
Seat reservation required for an extra charge, between Osaka Uehommachi or Osaka Namba on the Kintetsu Namba Line in Osaka and Nagoya or the Ise–Shima region.

== Stations ==
- ⬤ : All trains stop
- ▲ : Most trains stop
- △ : Some trains stop
- | ↓ ↑: All trains pass (Arrows indicate directions)

| No. | Stations | Japanese | Distance (km) | SSE | SE | SuEx | Ex | RE | LE | Transfers | Location | |
|---|---|---|---|---|---|---|---|---|---|---|---|---|
| Through service to Kintetsu Namba Line: | | | | from Ōsaka Uehommachi: Some trains continue to Ōsaka Namba on the Kintetsu Namba Line | | | | | | | | |
| D03 | Ōsaka Uehommachi | 大阪上本町 | 0.0 | ⬤ | ⬤ | ⬤ | ⬤ | ⬤ | ⬤ | A Kintetsu Namba Line (A03); Tanimachi Line (Tanimachi Kyūchōme) (T25); Sennichimae Line (Tanimachi Kyūchōme) (S18) | Tennōji-ku, Osaka | Osaka Prefecture |
| D04 | Tsuruhashi | 鶴橋 | 1.1 | ⬤ | ⬤ | ⬤ | ⬤ | ⬤ | ⬤ | O Osaka Loop Line (JR-O04); Sennichimae Line (S19) | Ikuno-ku, Osaka | Osaka Prefecture |
| D05 | Imazato | 今里 | 2.8 | | | | | | | | | | | | | | Ikuno-ku, Osaka | Osaka Prefecture |
| D06 | Fuse | 布施 | 4.1 | ⬤ | ⬤ | ⬤ | ⬤ | | | △ | A Kintetsu-Nara Line (A06) | Higashiōsaka | Osaka Prefecture |
| D07 | Shuntokumichi | 俊徳道 | 5.1 | | | | | | | | | | | | | F Osaka Higashi Line (JR Shuntokumichi) (JR-F11) | Higashiōsaka | Osaka Prefecture |
| D08 | Nagase (Kindai University) | 長瀬 | 6.2 | | | | | | | | | | | | | | Higashiōsaka | Osaka Prefecture |
| D09 | Mito | 弥刀 | 7.4 | | | | | | | | | | | | | | Higashiōsaka | Osaka Prefecture |
| D10 | Kyūhōjiguchi | 久宝寺口 | 8.3 | | | | | | | | | | | | | | Yao | Osaka Prefecture |
| D11 | Kintetsu Yao | 近鉄八尾 | 9.6 | ⬤ | ⬤ | ⬤ | | | | | | | | Yao | Osaka Prefecture |
| D12 | Kawachi-Yamamoto | 河内山本 | 11.1 | ⬤ | ⬤ | ⬤ | | | | | | | J Shigi Line (J12) | Yao | Osaka Prefecture |
| D13 | Takayasu | 高安 | 12.2 | ⬤ | ⬤ | ⬤ | | | | | | | | Yao | Osaka Prefecture |
| D14 | Onji | 恩智 | 13.3 | ⬤ | | | | | | | | | | | | Yao | Osaka Prefecture |
| D15 | Hōzenji | 法善寺 | 14.9 | ⬤ | | | | | | | | | | | | Kashiwara | Osaka Prefecture |
| D16 | Katashimo | 堅下 | 15.7 | ⬤ | | | | | | | | | | | N Domyoji Line (Kashiwara) (N17); Q Yamatoji Line (Kashiwara) (JR-Q27) | Kashiwara | Osaka Prefecture |
| D17 | Andō | 安堂 | 16.6 | ⬤ | | | | | | | | | | | | Kashiwara | Osaka Prefecture |
| D18 | Kawachi-Kokubu (Kansai University of Welfare Sciences) | 河内国分 | 18.2 | ⬤ | ⬤ | ⬤ | ⬤ | | | | | | Kashiwara | Osaka Prefecture |
| D19 | Ōsaka-Kyōikudai-mae (Ōsaka Kyōiku University) | 大阪 教育大前 | 19.8 | ⬤ | ⬤ | | | | | | | | | | Kashiwara | Osaka Prefecture |
| D20 | Sekiya | 関屋 | 22.0 | ⬤ | ⬤ | | | | | | | | | | Kashiba | Nara Prefecture |
| D21 | Nijō | 二上 | 24.1 | ⬤ | ⬤ | | | | | | | | | | Kashiba | Nara Prefecture |
| D22 | Kintetsu Shimoda | 近鉄下田 | 25.7 | ⬤ | ⬤ | | | | | | | | | | Kashiba | Nara Prefecture |
| D23 | Goidō (Mamigaoka New Town) | 五位堂 | 27.1 | ⬤ | ⬤ | ⬤ | ⬤ | ⬤ | △ | | Kashiba | Nara Prefecture |
| D24 | Tsukiyama | 築山 | 28.8 | ⬤ | ⬤ | | | | | | | | | | Yamatotakada | Nara Prefecture |
| D25 | Yamato-Takada | 大和高田 | 29.9 | ⬤ | ⬤ | ⬤ | ⬤ | ⬤ | △ | | Yamatotakada | Nara Prefecture |
| D26 | Matsuzuka | 松塚 | 31.8 | ⬤ | ⬤ | | | | | | | | | | Yamatotakada | Nara Prefecture |
| D27 | Masuga | 真菅 | 32.8 | ⬤ | ⬤ | | | | | | | | | | Kashihara | Nara Prefecture |
| Through service to Kashihara Line: | | | | from Yamato-Yagi: Some Limited Express trains continue to Kyōto on the Kintetsu Kashihara Line | | | | | | | | |
| D39 | Yamato-Yagi | 大和八木 | 34.8 | ⬤ | ⬤ | ⬤ | ⬤ | ⬤ | △ | B Kashihara Line (B39) | Kashihara | Nara Prefecture |
| D40 | Miminashi | 耳成 | 36.9 | ⬤ | ⬤ | | | | | | | | | | Kashihara | Nara Prefecture |
| D41 | Daifuku | 大福 | 38.2 | ⬤ | ⬤ | | | | | | | | | | Sakurai | Nara Prefecture |
| D42 | Sakurai | 桜井 | 39.8 | ⬤ | ⬤ | ⬤ | ⬤ | ⬤ | | | U Man-yō Mahoroba Line (Sakurai Line) | Sakurai | Nara Prefecture |
| D43 | Yamato-Asakura | 大和朝倉 | 41.9 | ⬤ | ⬤ | ⬤ | ⬤ | | | | | | Sakurai | Nara Prefecture |
| D44 | Hasedera | 長谷寺 | 45.6 | ⬤ | ⬤ | ⬤ | ⬤ | | | | | | Sakurai | Nara Prefecture |
| D45 | Haibara | 榛原 | 50.1 | ⬤ | ⬤ | ⬤ | ⬤ | ⬤ | △ | | Uda | Nara Prefecture |
| D46 | Murōguchi-Ōno | 室生口大野 | 57.2 | ⬤ | ⬤ | ⬤ | ⬤ | ⬤ | | | | Uda | Nara Prefecture |
| D47 | Sambommatsu | 三本松 | 59.7 | ⬤ | ⬤ | ⬤ | ⬤ | | | | | | Uda | Nara Prefecture |
| D48 | Akameguchi | 赤目口 | 64.0 | ⬤ | ⬤ | ⬤ | ⬤ | ⬤ | | | | Nabari | Mie Prefecture |
| D49 | Nabari | 名張 | 67.2 | ⬤ | ⬤ | ⬤ | ⬤ | ⬤ | ▲ | | Nabari | Mie Prefecture |
| D50 | Kikyōgaoka | 桔梗が丘 | 70.0 | | | ⬤ | ⬤ | ⬤ | △ | | Nabari | Mie Prefecture |
| D51 | Mihata | 美旗 | 73.1 | | | ⬤ | ⬤ | ⬤ | | | | Nabari | Mie Prefecture |
| D52 | Iga-Kambe | 伊賀神戸 | 75.5 | | | ⬤ | ⬤ | ⬤ | △ | ■ Iga Railway Iga Line | Iga | Mie Prefecture |
| D53 | Aoyamachō | 青山町 | 77.9 | | | ⬤ | ⬤ | ⬤ | | | | Iga | Mie Prefecture |
| D54 | Iga-Kōzu | 伊賀上津 | 80.6 | | | | ⬤ | ↓ | | | | Iga | Mie Prefecture |
| D55 | Nishi-Aoyama | 西青山 | 83.8 | | | | ⬤ | ↓ | | | | Iga | Mie Prefecture |
| D56 | Higashi-Aoyama | 東青山 | 91.5 | | | | ⬤ | ↓ | | | | Tsu | Mie Prefecture |
| D57 | Sakakibara-Onsenguchi | 榊原温泉口 | 95.4 | | | | ⬤ | ⬤ | △ | | Tsu | Mie Prefecture |
| D58 | Ōmitsu | 大三 | 97.6 | | | | | | ↓ | | | | Tsu | Mie Prefecture |
| D59 | Ise-Ishibashi | 伊勢石橋 | 101.6 | | | | | | ↓ | | | | Tsu | Mie Prefecture |
| D60 | Kawai-Takaoka | 川合高岡 | 104.4 | | | | | | ↓ | | | | Tsu | Mie Prefecture |
| D61 | Ise-Nakagawa | 伊勢中川 | 108.9 | | | | ⬤ | ⬤ | ▲ | E Nagoya Line (E61); M Yamada Line (M61) | Matsusaka | Mie Prefecture |
| Through service to: Kintetsu Nagoya Line Kintetsu Yamada Line | | | | from Ise-Nakagawa: Some trains continue to Kintetsu Nagoya on the Kintetsu Nagoya Line; Some trains continue to Ujiyamada on the Kintetsu Yamada Line | | | | | | | | |

== History ==
The Osaka Electric Railway opened the Osaka Uehommachi to Fuse section as 1,435 mm (4 ft 8 1/2 in) gauge dual track electrified at 600 V DC (as were all further sections unless otherwise noted) in 1914. The line was extended to Kintetsu Yao in 1924, and to Onji the following year. The Yamato-Takada to Yamato-Yagi section opened (with a single track) the same year, and was then linked to Onji and duplicated in 1927. The line was then extended to Sakurai in 1929 and the voltage on the Sakurai to Fuse section increased to 1,500 V DC to permit through-running with the Sangu Express Railway line (see below).

The Sangu Express Railway opened the Sakurai to Hase section in 1929, electrified at 1,500 V DC, and extended the line to Ise-Nakagawa the following year, single track beyond Nabari. The two companies became part of Kintetsu between 1941 and 1944.

The voltage on the Osaka Uehommachi to Fuse section was increased to 1,500 V DC in 1956, the Nabari to Iga-Kozu section was double-tracked between 1959 and 1961, and the rest of the line double-tracked between 1967 and 1975, when the 5,652 m Shin Aoyama tunnel was opened, at the time the longest tunnel built in Japan by a private railway.

=== Former connecting lines ===
- Sakurai Station: The Hase Railway opened a 6 km (3.7 mi) 1,067 mm (3 ft 6 in) gauge line to Hase in 1909. The company merged with the Osaka Electric Railway in 1928, the year before the Sangu Express Railway opened the Sakurai to Hase line in 1929, and the line closed in 1938. The Yamato Railway operated an 8 km (5.0 mi) 1,067 mm gauge line electrified at 600 V DC to Nishi-Tawaramoto on the Kashihara Line between 1923 and 1958.
- Iga-Kambe Station: The (first) Iga Railway opened a 26 km (16 mi) 1,067 mm gauge line between Iga-Ueno on the Kansai Main Line and Nishi-Nabari in 1922, including a connection at this station. The line was electrified at 1,500 V DC in 1926. The section to Nishi-Nabari closed in 1964, with the Iga Line operated by the (second) Iga Railway after Kintetsu transferred operation of the line in 2007.
- Ise-Ishibashi Station: The Dainippon Railway operated a 15 km (9.3 mi) 762 mm (2 ft 6 in) gauge line between Hisai on the Nagoya Line and Ise-Kawaguchi on the Meisho Line that connected here between 1925 and 1943.
