= Iga-Kōzu Station =

Railway station in Iga, Mie Prefecture, Japan

Iga-Kōzu Station 伊賀上津駅
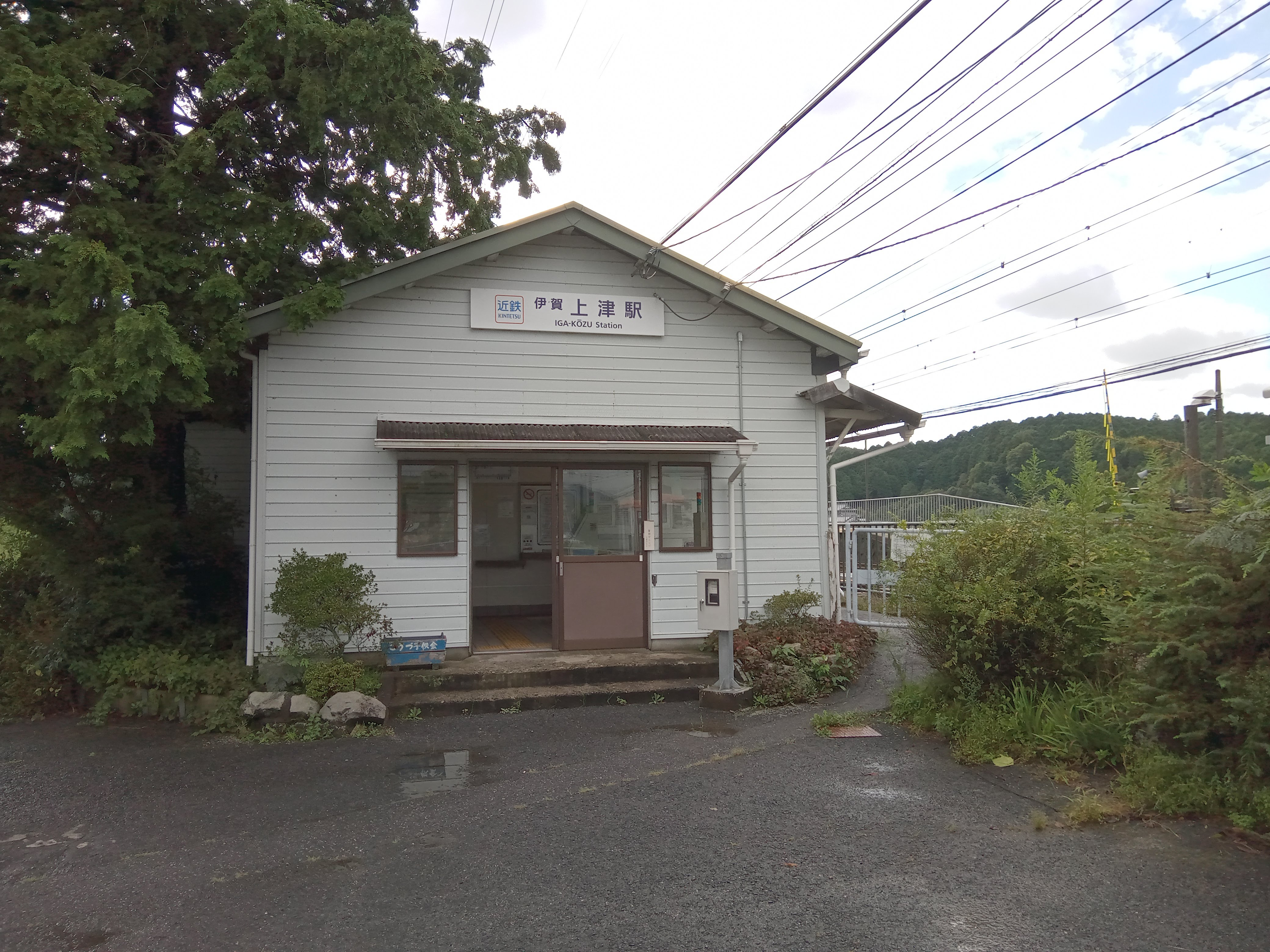
- Iga-Kōzu Station in September 2021

General information
- Location: 192 Igaji, Iga-shi, Mie-ken 518-0205; Japan
- Coordinates: 34.6826°N 136.2053°E
- Operator: Kintetsu Railway
- Line: Osaka Line
- Distance: 80.6 km from Ōsaka Uehommachi
- Platforms: 2 side platforms

Other information
- Station code: D54
- Website: Official website

History
- Opened: December 20, 1930

Passengers
- FY2019: 110 daily

Services
Preceding station	Kintetsu Railway	Following station
Aoyamachō towards Osaka Uehommachi	Osaka Line Local Express	Nishi-Aoyama towards Ise-Nakagawa
Location
- Location within Mie Prefecture Location within Japan

Iga-Kōzu Station (伊賀上津駅, Iga-Kōzu-eki) is a passenger railway station in located in the city of Iga, Mie Prefecture, Japan, operated by the private railway operator Kintetsu Railway.

== Lines ==
Iga-Kōzu Station is served by the Osaka Line, and is located 80.6 rail kilometers from the starting point of the line at Ōsaka Uehommachi Station.

== Station layout ==
The station consists of two opposed side platforms, connected by a level crossing. The station is unattended.

=== Platforms ===
1	■ Osaka Line	for Ise-Nakagawa, Ujiyamada, Kashikojima and Nagoya
2	■ Osaka Line	for Nabari, Yamato-Yagi and Osaka Uehommachi

== History ==
Iga-Kōzu Station opened on December 20, 1930, as a station on the Sangu Express Electric Railway. After merging with Osaka Electric Kido on March 15, 1941, the line became the Kansai Express Railway's Osaka Line. This line was merged with the Nankai Electric Railway on June 1, 1944, to form Kintetsu.

== Passenger statistics ==
In fiscal 2019, the station was used by an average of 110 passengers daily (boarding passengers only).

== Surrounding area ==
- Japan National Route 165

== See also ==
- List of railway stations in Japan
