= Kōzu Station =

Kōzu Station is the name of multiple train stations in Japan.

- Kōzu Station (Kanagawa) (国府津駅) in Odawara, Kanagawa Prefecture
- Kōzu Station (Osaka) (郡津駅) in Hirakata, Osaka Prefecture
- Iga-Kōzu Station (伊賀上津駅) in Iga, Mie Prefecture
