= Nijō Station (Nara) =

Railway station in Kashiba, Nara Prefecture, Japan

Nijō Station 二上駅
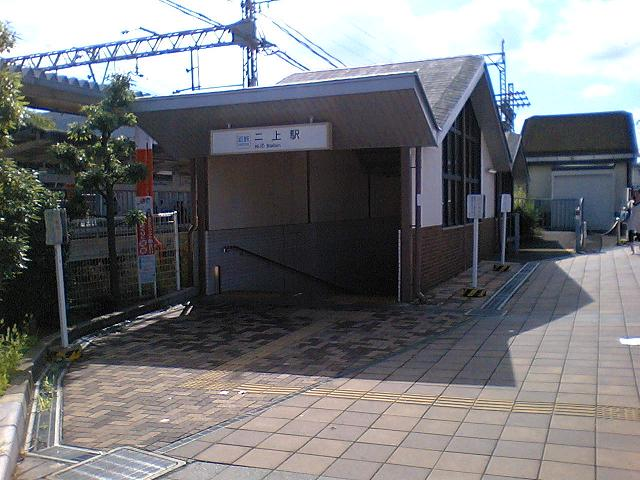
- Nijō Station south exit

General information
- Location: 2023 Anamushi, Kashiba-shi, Nara-ken 639-0252; Japan
- Coordinates: 34°32′46.9″N 135°41′17.99″E
- System: Kintetsu Railway commuter rail station
- Owner: Kintetsu Railway
- Operator: Kintetsu Railway
- Line: D Osaka Line
- Distance: 22.0 km (13.7 miles) from Osaka Uehommachi
- Platforms: 2 side platforms
- Tracks: 2
- Train operators: Kintetsu Railway
- Connections: Bus terminal

Construction
- Cycle facilities: Available
- Accessible: Yes

Other information
- Station code: D21
- Website: www.kintetsu.co.jp/station/station_info/station02023.html

History
- Opened: 1 July 1927

Passengers
- FY2019: 5101 daily

Services
Preceding station	Kintetsu Railway	Following station
Sekiya towards Osaka Uehommachi	Osaka Line Local Semi-Express	Kintetsu Shimoda towards Ise-Nakagawa
Location

Nijō Station (二上駅, Nijō-eki) is a passenger railway station located in the city of Kashiba, Nara Prefecture, Japan. It is operated by the private transportation company, Kintetsu Railway.

== Line ==
Nijō Station is served by the Osaka Line and is 24.1 kilometers from the starting point of the line at Ōsaka Uehommachi.

== Layout ==
The station is an above-ground station with two opposed side platforms and two tracksThe ticket gates and concourses are underground, and the platforms are above ground. The effective length of the platform is six cars. The station is unattended.

== Platforms ==
1	■ D Osaka Line	for Goido, Yamato-Yagi, and Nabari
2	■ D Osaka Line	for Kawachi-Kokubu, and Osaka Uehommachi

== History ==
Nijō Station was opened 1 July 1927 as a station on the Osaka Electric Tramway Yagi Line. It became a Kansai Express Railway station due to a company merger with Sangu Express Railway on 15 March 1941, and through a subsequent merger became a station on the Kintetsu Railway on 1 July 1944.

== Passenger statistics ==
In fiscal 2019 the station was used by an average of 5101 passengers daily (boarding passengers only).

== Surrounding area ==
- Kashiba City Kashiba Kita Junior High School
- Kashiba City Kashiba Nishi Junior High School
- Kashiba City Nijo Elementary School
- Kashiba City Asahigaoka Elementary School

== See also ==
- List of railway stations in Japan
