= Ishibashi Station =

Ishibashi Station is the name of multiple train stations in Japan.

- Ishibashi Station (Tochigi) in Shomotsuke, Tochigi
- Ishibashi Station (Nagasaki) in Nagasaki, Nagasaki

== See also ==
- Ishibashi handai-mae Station (formerly named Ishibashi Station)
- Ise-Ishibashi Station
- Minakuchi Ishibashi Station
