= Matsugasaki Station =

Matsugasaki Station may refer to:

- Matsugasaki Station (Kyoto), a subway station on the Karasuma Line
- Matsugasaki Station (Mie), a railway station on the Kintetsu Yamada Line
