= Nijō Station =

Nijō Station may refer to either of the following railway stations in Japan:

- Nijō Station (Kyoto) (二条駅) on the Sanin Main Line (Sagano Line) and the Kyoto Subway Tōzai Line in Nakagyo-ku, Kyoto
- Nijō Station (Nara) (二上駅) on the Kintetsu Osaka Line in Kashiba, Nara Prefecture
