= Ise-Nakahara Station =

Railway station in Matsusaka, Mie Prefecture, Japan

Ise-Nakahara Station 伊勢中原駅
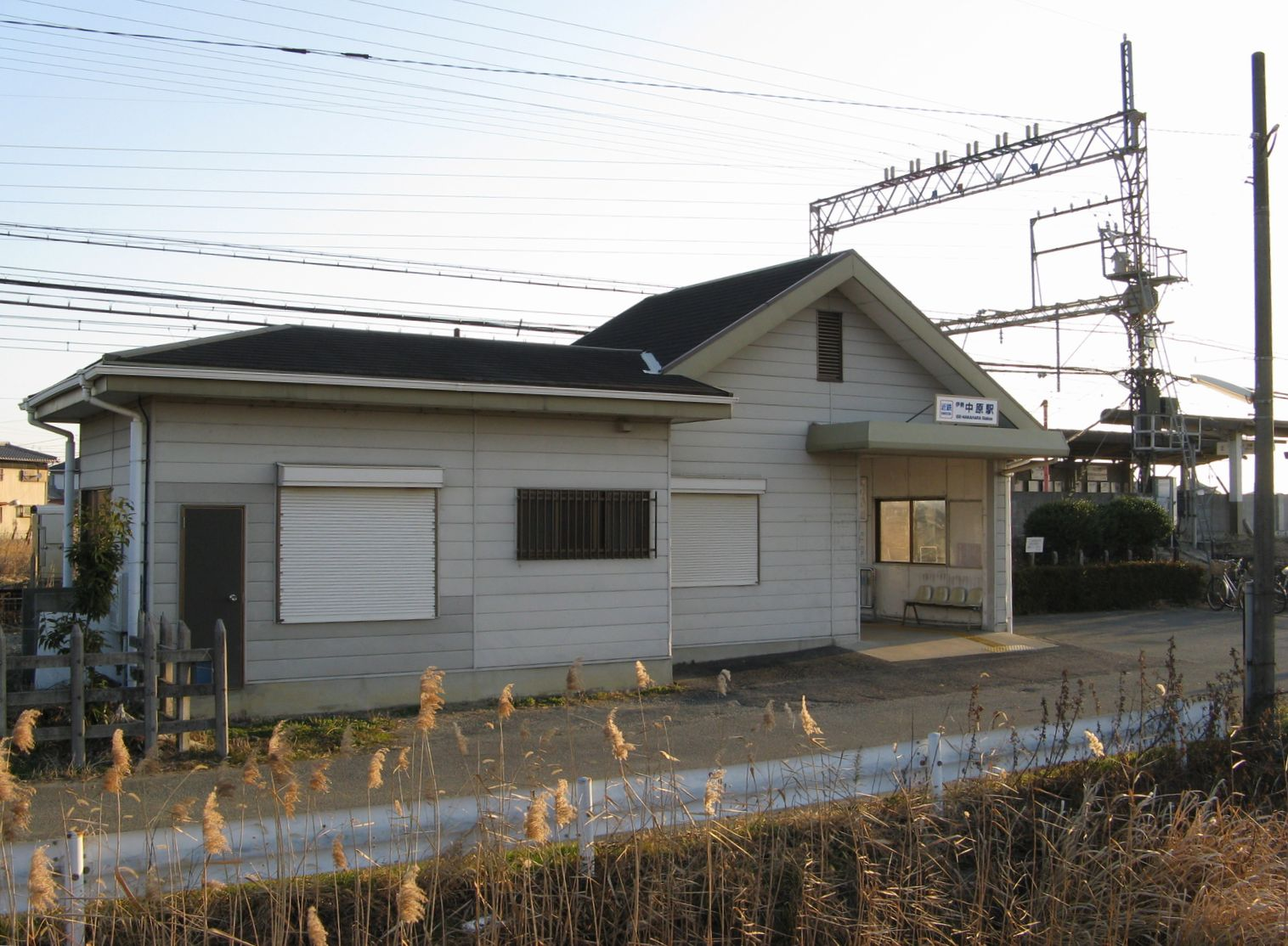
- Ise-Nakahara Station

General information
- Location: 1455 Ureshinotsuyajo-cho, Matsusaka-shi, Mie-ken 515-2332; Japan
- Coordinates: 34.6149°N 136.4973°E
- Operator: Kintetsu Railway
- Line: Yamada Line
- Distance: 3.0 km from Ise-Nakagawa
- Platforms: 2 side platforms
- Connections: Bus terminal

Other information
- Station code: M62
- Website: Official website

History
- Opened: May 18, 1930
- Former names: Sangu-Nakahara (until 1940)

Passengers
- FY2019: 233 daily
Location
- Location within Mie Prefecture Location within Japan

Ise-Nakahara Station (伊勢中原駅, Ise-Nakahara-eki) is a passenger railway station located in the city of Matsusaka, Mie Prefecture, Japan, operated by the private railway operator Kintetsu Railway.

== Lines ==
Ise-Nakahara Station is served by the Yamada Line, and is located 3.0 rail kilometers from the terminus of the line at Ise-Nakagawa Station.

== Station layout ==
The station consists of two opposed side platforms connected by a level crossing. The station is unattended.

=== Platforms ===
1	■ Yamada Line	for Ujiyamada, Toba and Kashikojima
2	■ Yamada Line	for Ise-Nakagawa, Shiratsuka and Nabari

== Adjacent stations ==
«	Service	»
Yamada Line
Ise-Nakagawa	Local	Matsugasaki
Express: Does not stop at this station
Rapid Express: Does not stop at this station

== History ==
Ise-Nakahara Station opened on May 18, 1930 as Sangu-Nakahara Station (参急中原駅, Sangu-Nakahara-eki) on the Sangu Express Electric Railway. On March 15, 1941, the Sangu Express Electric Railway merged with Osaka Electric Railway to become a station on Kansai Express Railway's Yamada Line, at which time the station was renamed to its present name. This line in turn was merged with the Nankai Electric Railway on June 1, 1944 to form Kintetsu. The station has been unattended since February 1, 2005.

== Passenger statistics ==
In fiscal 2019, the station was used by an average of 233 passengers daily (boarding passengers only).

== See also ==
- List of railway stations in Japan
