= Matsugasaki Station (Mie) =

Railway station in Matsusaka, Mie Prefecture, Japan

Matsugasaki Station 松ヶ崎駅
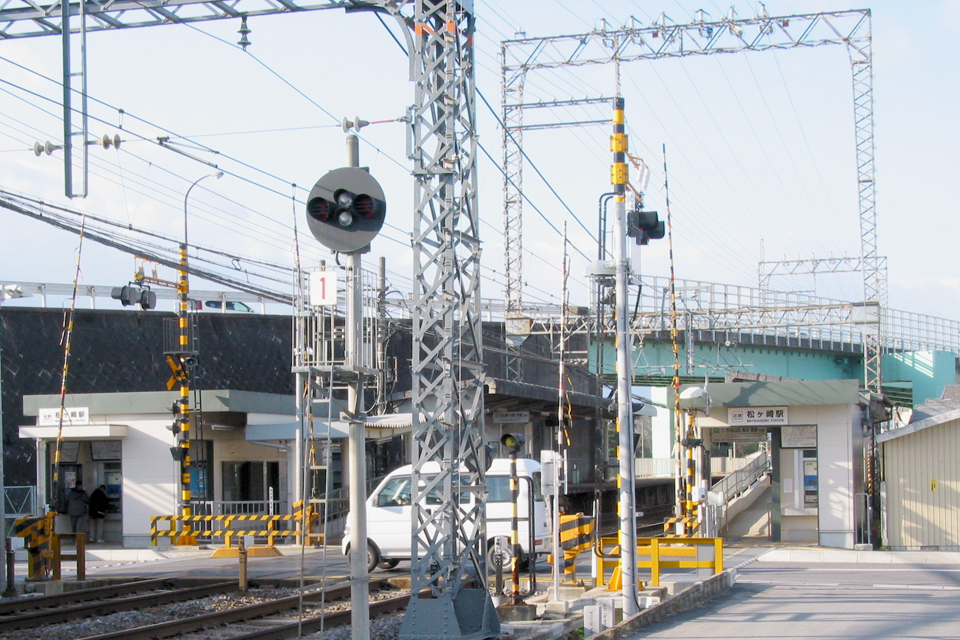
- Matsugasaki Station

General information
- Location: 1274-2 Kume-cho, Matsusaka-shi, Mie-ken 515-2122; Japan
- Coordinates: 34°35′47″N 136°31′07″E
- Operator: Kintetsu Railway
- Line: Yamada Line
- Distance: 5.7 km from Ise-Nakagawa
- Platforms: 2 side platforms
- Connections: Bus terminal

Other information
- Station code: M63
- Website: Official website

History
- Opened: May 18, 1930
- Former names: Sangu-Matsue (until 1937)

Passengers
- FY2019: 533 daily
Location
- Location within Mie Prefecture Location within Japan

Matsugasaki Station (松ヶ崎駅, Matsugasaki-eki) is a passenger railway station located in the city of Matsusaka, Mie Prefecture, Japan, operated by the private railway operator Kintetsu Railway.

== Lines ==
Matsugasaki Station is served by the Yamada Line, and is located 5.7 rail kilometers from the terminus of the line at Ise-Nakagawa Station.

== Station layout ==
The station consists of two elevated opposed side platforms connected by an underground passage. The station is unattended.

=== Platforms ===
1	■ Yamada Line	for Ujiyamada, Toba and Kashikojima
2	■ Yamada Line	for Ise-Nakagawa,Shiratsuka and Nabari

== Adjacent stations ==
«	Service	»
Yamada Line
Ise-Nakahara	Local	Matsusaka
Express: Does not stop at this station
Rapid Express: Does not stop at this station

== History ==
Matsugasaki Station opened on May 18, 1930 as Sangu-Matsue Station (参急松江駅, Sangu-Matsue-eki) on the Sangu Express Electric Railway. On November 3, 1937 the station was rebuilt on a new location 300-meters closer towards Ise-Nakagawa Station, and renamed to its present name. On March 15, 1941, the Sangu Express Electric Railway merged with Osaka Electric Railway to become a station on Kansai Express Railway's Yamada Line. This line in turn was merged with the Nankai Electric Railway on June 1, 1944 to form Kintetsu.

== Passenger statistics ==
In fiscal 2019, the station was used by an average of 533 passengers daily (boarding passengers only).

== Surrounding area ==
- Matsusaka Shopping Center Marm (ÆON Matsusaka Store, formerly JUSCO)
- Apita Matsusaka-mikumo (shopping center)

== See also ==
- List of railway stations in Japan
