= Kansai University of Welfare Sciences =

Higher education institution in Osaka Prefecture, Japan

Coordinates: 34°33′26″N 135°38′13″E

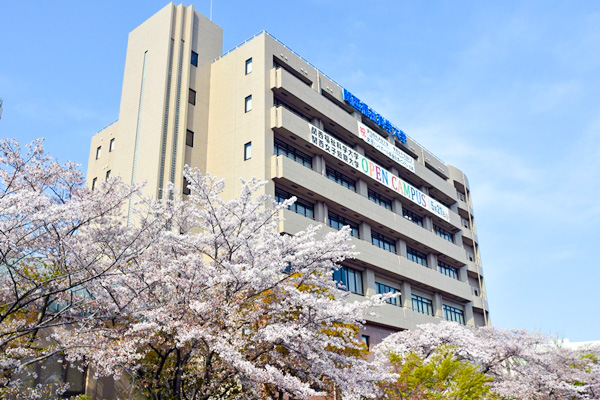
Kansai University of Welfare Sciences Bldg no.2

Kansai University of Welfare Sciences (関西福祉科学大学, Kansai fukushi kagaku daigaku) is a private university in Kashiwara, Osaka, Japan, established in 1997.
