= Higashi-Aoyama Station =

Railway station in Tsu, Mie Prefecture, Japan

Higashi-Aoyama Station 東青山駅
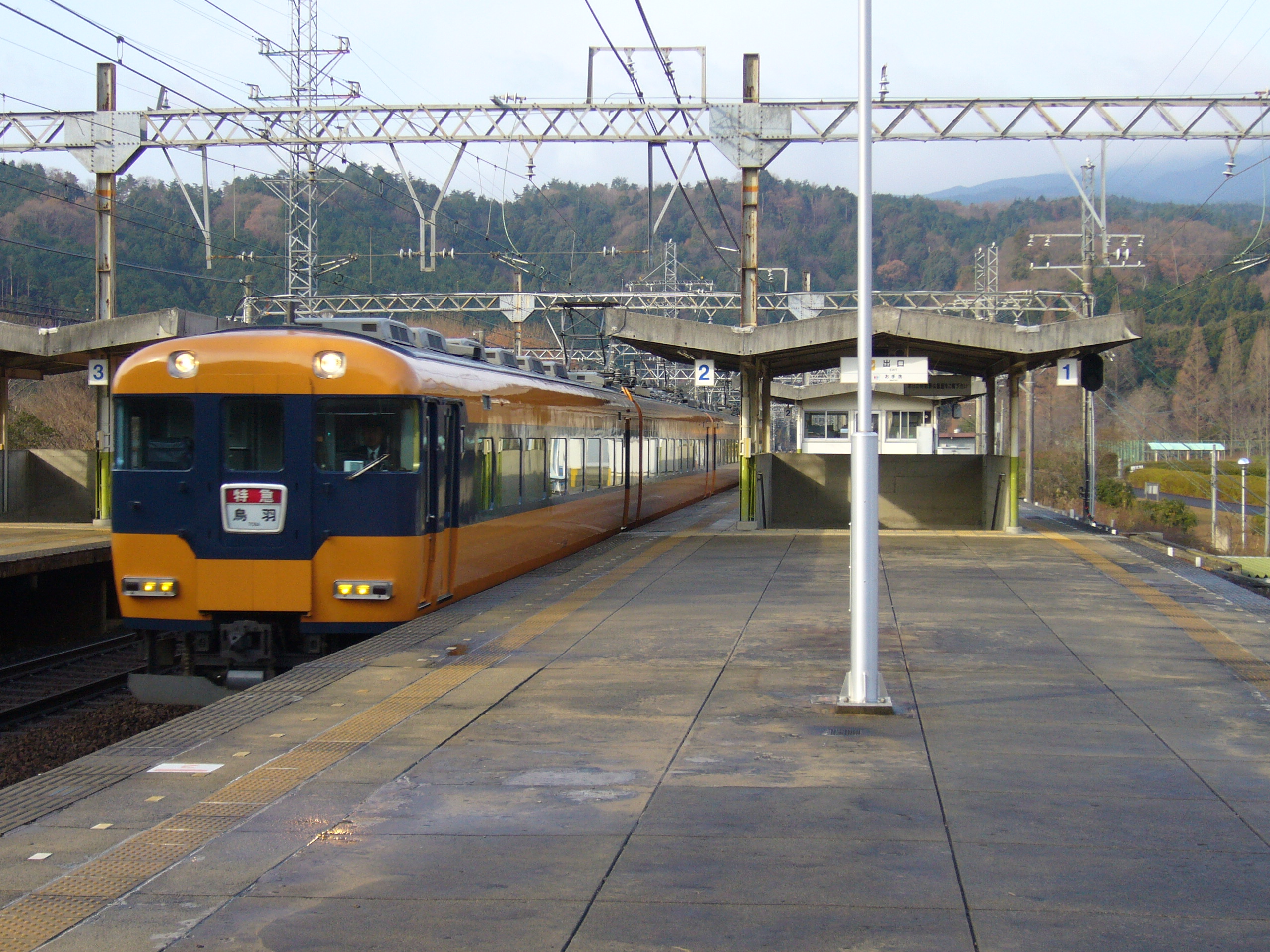
- Higashi-Aoyama Station

General information
- Location: 1074 Uenomura, Tsu-shi, Mie-ken 515-2623; Japan
- Coordinates: 34.6758°N 136.3215°E
- Operator: Kintetsu Railway
- Line: Osaka Line
- Distance: 91.5 km from Ōsaka Uehommachi
- Platforms: 2 island platforms

Other information
- Station code: D56
- Website: Official website

History
- Opened: December 20, 1930

Passengers
- FY2019: 36 daily
Location
- Location within Mie Prefecture Location within Japan

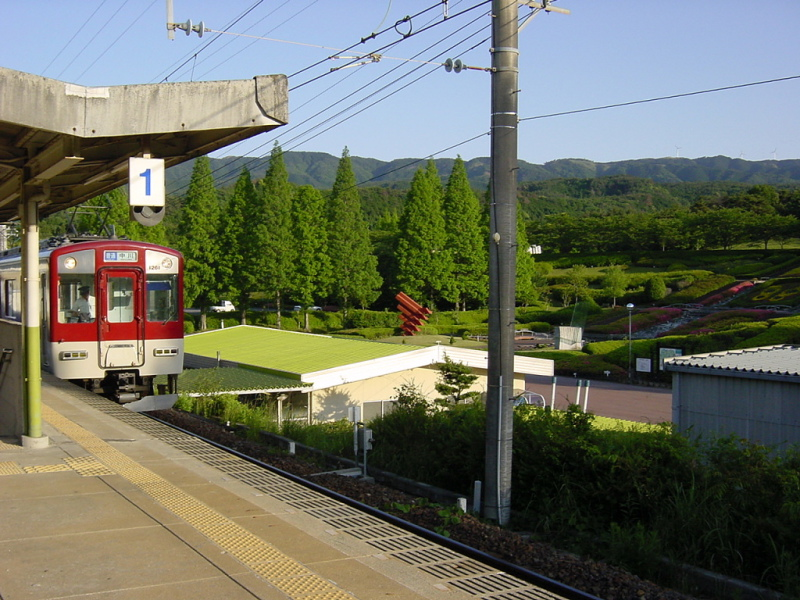
Higashi-Aoyama Station, early morning

Higashi-Aoyama Station (東青山駅, Higashi-Aoyama-eki) is a passenger railway station in located in the city of Tsu, Mie Prefecture, Japan, operated by the private railway operator Kintetsu Railway.

== Lines ==
Higashi-Aoyama Station is served by the Osaka Line, and is located 91.5 rail kilometers from the starting point of the line at Ōsaka Uehommachi Station.

== Station layout ==
The station was consists of two opposed island platforms, connected by an underground passage. The station is unattended.

=== Platforms ===
1, 2	■ Osaka Line	for Ise-Nakagawa, Ujiyamada, Kashikojima, and Nagoya
3, 4	■ Osaka Line	forNabari, Yamato-Yagi and Osaka Uehommachi

== Adjacent stations ==
«	Service	»
Osaka Line
Nishi-Aoyama	Local	Sakakibara-Onsenguchi
Nishi-Aoyama	Express	Sakakibara-Onsenguchi
Rapid Express: Does not stop at this station

== History ==
Higashi-Aoyama Station opened on December 20, 1930 as a station on the Sangu Kyuko Electric Railway. After merging with Osaka Electric Kido on March 15, 1941, the line became the Kansai Kyuko Railway's Osaka Line. This line was merged with the Nankai Electric Railway on June 1, 1944 to form Kintetsu.

On October 25, 1971, due to failure of an ATS system in Aoyama Tunnel, a runaway limited express train derailed in Sodani Tunnel near this station and collided head-on with another train, causing 25 fatalities. This became known as the Aoyama Tunnel Accident.

On November 25, 1975, after a landslide obliterated part of the tracks between this station and Sakakibara-Onsenguchi, the tracks were slightly rerouted, a new tunnel was constructed, and a new station building was built.

On February 27, 2009 a derailment of a local train occurred at this station. No fatalities were reported.

== Passenger statistics ==
In fiscal 2019, the station was used by an average of 36 passengers daily (boarding passengers only).

== Surrounding area ==
- Aoyama Highlands
- Nunobiki Waterfall

== See also ==
- List of railway stations in Japan
