= Ise-Nakagawa Station =

Railway station in Matsusaka, Mie Prefecture, Japan

Ise-Nakagawa Station 伊勢中川駅
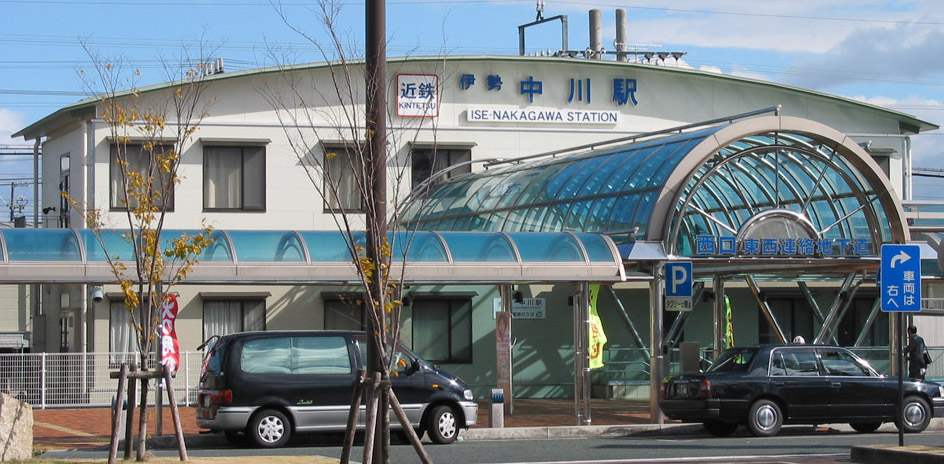
- Ise-Nakagawa Station

General information
- Location: 1-93 Ureshinonakagawashin-cho, Matsusaka-shi, Mie-ken 515-2325, Japan
- Coordinates: 34°38′6.08″N 136°28′40.39″E
- Operator: Kintetsu Railway
- Lines: Nagoya Line; Osaka Line; Yamada Line

Other information
- Status: Staffed
- Station code: D61, E61, M61
- Website: Official website

History
- Opened: 18 May 1930
- Former names: Sankyū-Nakagawa (until 1941)

Passengers
- FY2019: 4269 daily
Location
- Location within Mie Prefecture Location within Japan

Ise-Nakagawa Station (伊勢中川駅, Ise-Nakagawa-eki) is a major junction station owned and operated by the private Kintetsu railway company in the city of Matsusaka, Mie Prefecture. The station is served by all trains on that company's Yamada Line and most trains on its Nagoya and Osaka Lines. The Ise-Nakagawa stationmaster is responsible for managing the sections between here and Higashi-Aoyama on the Osaka Line and between here and Higashi-Matsusaka on the Yamada Line.

== Lines ==
- Kintetsu Railway
  - Nagoya Line (to Kintetsu-Nagoya)
  - Osaka Line (to Ōsaka-Uehommachi)
  - Yamada Line (to Ujiyamada)

== Station layout ==
The station consists of six parallel tracks numbered 1 through 6 (see diagram below). Four island platforms are located to serve Tracks 1 & 2, 2 & 3, 3 & 4, and 4 & 5. Track 6 is served by a single side platform. This layout allows trains on Tracks 2, 3, and 4 to open their doors on both sides, enabling easy transfer between trains on the three major lines which connect at this station.

Limited express trains running directly between the Nagoya Line and the Osaka Line do not pass through Ise-Nakagawa station. Instead, these trains use a north-east to north-west chord which connects the two lines at a point some 3.5 km north-west of the station, the two trunk lines and this chord together constituting a triangular junction.

Track layout of Ise-Nakagawa Station
Nagoya Line for Tsu, Yokkaichi, and Nagoya
	Yamada Line for Ujiyamada, Toba, and Kashikojima
Osaka Line for Ōsaka-Uehommachi, Ōsaka-Namba, and Kyōto

1	■ Yamada Line	for Ujiyamada , and Kashikojima
1	■ Nagoya Line	for Tsu, Yokkaichi, and Nagoya
2, 3	■ Yamada Line	for Ujiyamada, and Kashikojima
2, 3	■ Nagoya Line	for Tsu, Yokkaichi, and Nagoya
2, 3	■ Osaka Line	for Ōsaka-Uehommachi ,Ōsaka-Namba and Kyōto
4, 5	■ Nagoya Line	for Tsu, Yokkaichi, and Nagoya
4, 5	■ Osaka Line	for Ōsaka-Uehommachi, Ōsaka-Namba and Kyōto
6	■ Osaka Line	for Higashi-Aoyama and Nabari

== Adjacent stations ==
«	Service	»
Osaka Line
Kawai-Takaoka	Local	Ise-Nakahara
Sakakibara-Onsenguchi	Express	Matsusaka
Sakakibara-Onsenguchi	Rapid Express (eastbound only)	Matsusaka
Iga-Kambe; Sakakibara-Onsenguchi	Limited Express	Matsusaka
Nagoya Line
Momozono	Local	Ise-Nakahara
Momozono	Express	Matsusaka
Tsu; Hisai	Limited Express	Matsusaka
Yamada Line
Kawai-Takaoka; Momozono	Local	Ise-Nakahara
Sakakibara-Onsenguchi; Momozono	Express	Matsusaka
Sakakibara-Onsenguchi	Rapid Express (eastbound only)	Matsusaka
Iga-Kambe; Sakakibara-Onsenguchi; Tsu; Hisai	Limited Express	Matsusaka

== History ==
The first station on the site was opened on 18 May 1930 as Sankyū-Nakagawa Station (参急中川駅, Sankyū-Nakagawa-eki) on the Sangu Express Electric Railway. It received its present name on 15 March 1941 when this company merged with the Osaka Electric Railway to form the Kansai Express Railway and Ise-Nakagawa become a station on the merged company's Yamada Line. A further merger, with the Nankai Electric Railway on 1 June 1, 1944, created the Kinki Nippon Railway, forerunner of today's Kintetsu Railway Co. Ltd. A new station building was completed in 2004.

== Passenger statistics ==
In fiscal 2019, the station was used by an average of 4369 passengers daily (boarding passengers only).

== Surrounding area ==
- Ureshino Furusato Center
- Matsusaka City Ureshino Junior High School
- Matsusaka City Nakagawa Elementary School
- Matsusaka City Nakahara Elementary School
- Matsusaka City Toyoda Elementary School
- Matsusaka Municipal Toyoji Elementary School

== See also ==
- List of railway stations in Japan
