= Kintetsu Nagoya Station =

Railway station in Aichi Prefecture, Japan

Kintetsu-Nagoya Station 近鉄名古屋駅
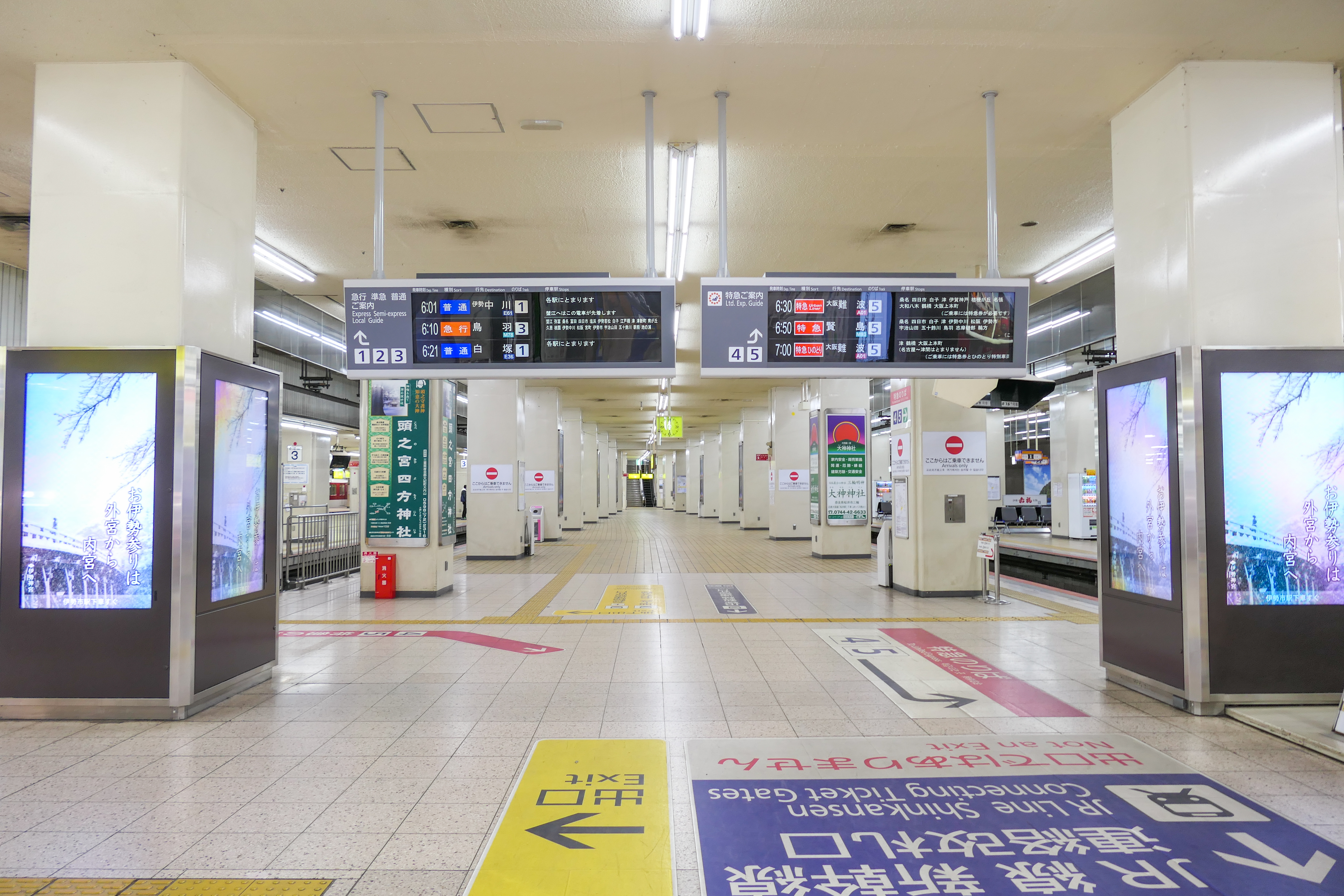
- The arrival platform of the station in 2022

General information
- Location: Nakamura, Nagoya, Aichi; Japan
- Coordinates: 35°10′8.9″N 136°53′3.5″E
- Operator: Kintetsu Railway
- Line: Nagoya Line
- Platforms: 4 bay platforms, 5 tracks
- Connections: Meitetsu Nagoya Station; Nagoya Station; Kintetsu Bus

Construction
- Structure type: Underground Train Station

Other information
- Station code: E01

History
- Opened: 26 June 1938

Passengers
- 2023–2024: 90,883 daily

Services
Preceding station	Kintetsu Railway	Following station
Komeno (E02) towards Ise-Nakagawa	Nagoya Line Local	Terminus
Kintetsu Kanie (E08) towards Ise-Nakagawa	Nagoya Line Express Semi-Express	Terminus
Kuwana (E13) towards Ise-Nakagawa	Nagoya Line Hinotori (some) Urban Liner	Terminus
Tsu (E39) towards Ise-Nakagawa	Nagoya Line Hinotori Ise-Shima Liner	Terminus
Kintetsu Yokkaichi (E21) towards Ise-Nakagawa	Nagoya Line Shimakaze	Terminus
Location

Kintetsu-Nagoya Station (近鉄名古屋駅, Kintetsu Nagoya-eki) is an underground terminal station on the Kintetsu Nagoya Line. It is connected to the Nagoya Station (served by JR Central lines, Aonami Line, and the Nagoya City Subway) and the Meitetsu Nagoya Station (served by the Meitetsu Nagoya Main Line). The station serves the Meieki commercial area of Nagoya city, under redevelopment led by Meitetsu as of 2025. It is assigned station number E01.

The station was opened on 26 June 1938 by the Kansai Rapid Electric Railway, a subsidiary of the Ōsaka Electric Tramway, as the terminus of its extension to Nagoya. The station originally had two bay platforms and three tracks. Due to an influx in the number of passengers, the station was expanded with two new platforms and tracks from 1964 to 1967.

== History ==
Kansai Rapid Electric Railway, a subsidiary of the Ōsaka Electric Tramway, opened the section from Kuwana to what is now Kintetsu Nagoya Station on 26 June 1938 as the northern terminus of the Kintetsu Nagoya Line. The station at the time of the opening was named the Kankyu Nagoya Station (関急名古屋駅). On 1 January 1940, the station was renamed to the Sankyu Nagoya Station (参急名古屋駅) upon the merger of the Kansai Rapid Electric Railway into the Sankyu Rapid Electric Railway. This name change was reverted on 15 March 1941, when the Ōsaka Electric Tram merged with the Sankyu Rapid Electric Railway to form the Kansai Rapid Railway. For a brief period, the Nagoya Line was connected with the Meitetsu Nagoya Main Line. The Kintetsu Nagoya Station was linked with the adjacent Meitetsu Nagoya Station from August 1950 to September 1952. Using this connection, reserved trains from Kintetsu were able to reach Toyokawa Station near Toyokawa Inari via the Meitetsu Nagoya Main Line and the JNR-operated Iida Line. Meitetsu trains, on the other hand, could reach Kuwana and Ise-Nakagawa. This link was disconnected due to changes in the Kintetsu Nagoya Line's rail gauge, and the construction of the Meitetsu Department Store.

The station originally had two bay platforms serving three tracks, but they were not enough for the increasing amount of passengers after World War II. The ridership around 1955 was almost seven times higher than when the station opened The underground station, beneath the Japanese National Railways (JNR) Nagoya Station, was surrounded by the Meitetsu Nagoya Station to the east and the JNR-owned plot to the west. The JNR allowed Kintetsu to use its land for the expansion in January 1964, and construction started in December of that year. The Nagoya Kintetsu Building, now named the Kintetsu Pass'e, was opened in November 1966. An underground concourse above the Meitetsu Nagoya Station connected the station to the commercial building. Additions of new platforms finished in stages by 1 December 1967, which added two more bay platforms and two more tracks. Transfer gates with the JNR's Nagoya Station opened on 1 April 1969. On 1 March 1970, the station was renamed to the current name.

Platform screen doors will be installed on the platforms facing track 2 and 3, which is planned to be completed by the end of March 2027. As a part of the redevelopments in the area, the Kintetsu Pass'e is set to be closed at the end of February 2026 and dismantled.

== Details ==
=== Location ===
The station is located in the Meieki area of Nagoya, popular among tourists visiting Aichi Prefecture. In the area, major redevelopments led by Meitetsu have been taking place as of 2025. Meieki has been competing with Sakae and Kanayama for the position of Nagoya's commercial center.

=== Layout ===
The station is built underground, and has four bay platforms serving five tracks. The basement also has transfer gates with automated turnstiles to the Nagoya Station (operated by JR Central), the Nagoya Municipal Subway's Higashiyama Line platforms, and the Meitetsu Nagoya Station (operated by Meitetsu). The five platforms are also connected by an underground concourse between the basement floor and the first floor, which connects the station to the Kintetsu Pass'e, a department store run by Kintetsu. The station is staffed at all times. Escalators and elevators are installed in the station.

1	■ Nagoya Line	Served by local trains
2	■ Nagoya Line	Served by semi-express trains partly by express trains
3	■ Nagoya Line	Served by express trains partly by semi-express trains
4	■ Nagoya Line	Served by limited express trains
5	■ Nagoya Line	Served by limited express trains

Track layout of Kintetsu Nagoya Station and Komeno Station
→ Kogane

=== Services ===
Kintetsu Nagoya Station is assigned station number E01 for the Kintetsu Nagoya Line it serves. The station is the terminus of the line, and trains run from 5:18 a.m. to 12:04 a.m.
