= Ōsaka Uehommachi Station =

Railway station in Osaka, Japan

Ōsaka-Uehommachi Station 大阪上本町駅
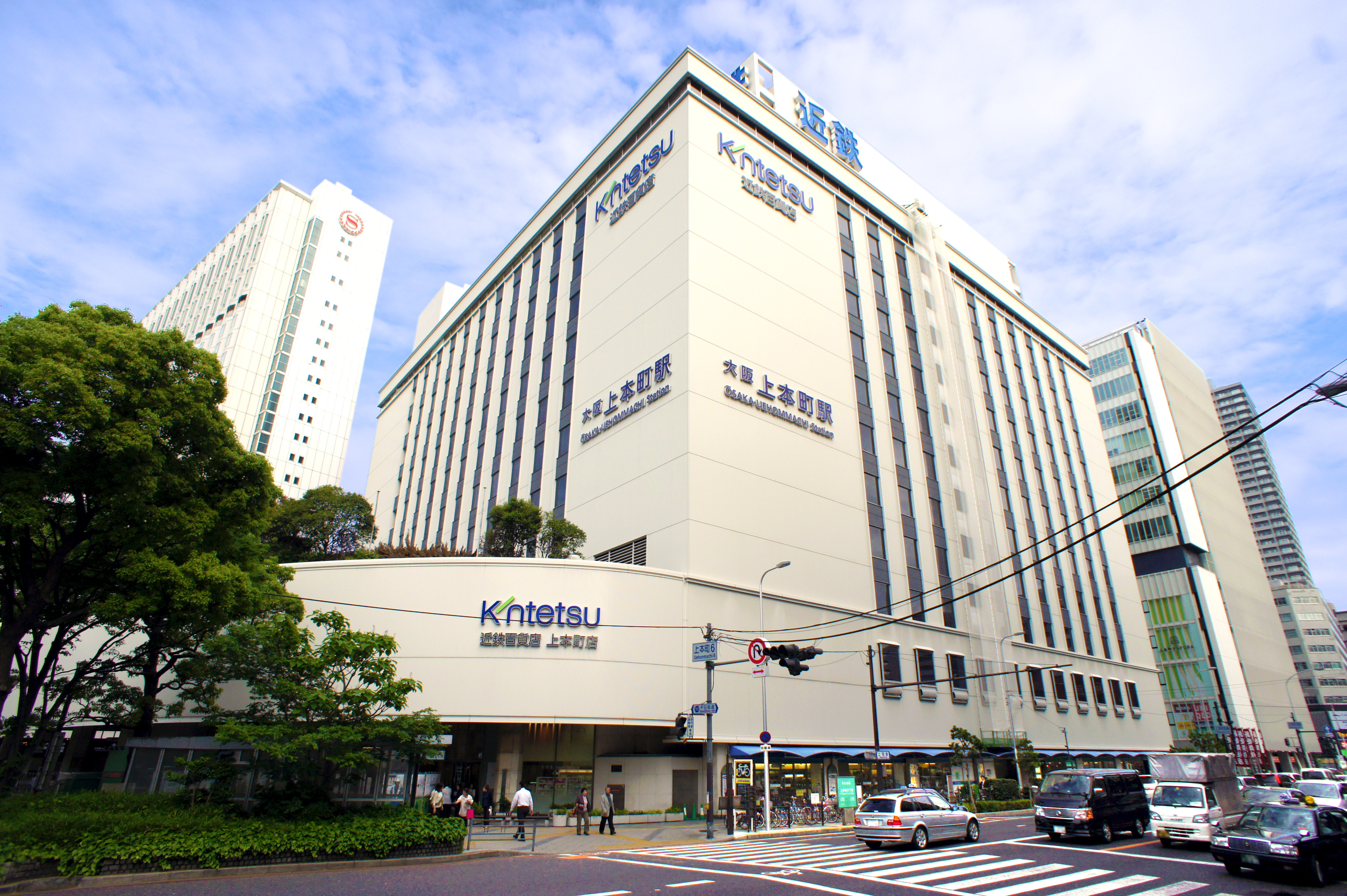
- Station building

General information
- Location: 6-1-55, Uehommachi, Tennōji Ward, Osaka City, Osaka （大阪府大阪市天王寺区上本町六丁目1-55） Japan
- Coordinates: 34°39′56″N 135°31′17″E
- Operator: Kintetsu Railway
- Lines: D Osaka Line; A Nara Line; A Kintetsu Namba Line
- Platforms: 7 bay platforms (1st floor); 2 side platforms (underground)
- Tracks: 6 (1st floor); 2 (underground)
- Connections: Bus Terminal

Construction
- Structure type: At-grade (Osaka Line); Underground (Nara Line)

Other information
- Station code: A03 (Nara Line); D03 (Osaka Line)

History
- Opened: 30 April 1914; 112 years ago
- Former names: Uehommachi (until 2009)

Passengers
- 2021: 60,382
Track layout
3rd basement
1st level
Location
- Location within Osaka Prefecture Location within Kansai region Location within Japan

Ōsaka-Uehommachi Station (大阪上本町駅, Ōsaka-Uehonmachi-eki) is a railway station in Tennoji-ku, Osaka, Japan, served by the Kintetsu Railway's Osaka, Nara, and Namba Lines. Trains on the Nara Line arrive at and depart from an underground platform. The station is connected to Tanimachi Kyuchome Station on the Tanimachi Line (T25) and the Sennichimae Line (S18) of the Osaka Metro. It has been the Kintetsu Railway's terminus since the Nara Line was opened in 1914.

The station is also known as Ueroku Station (上六駅, Ueroku-eki) since it is located in Uehommachi Rokuchōme (or Ueroku for short), which is currently used as the name of the connecting bus stops. The station was renamed from Uehommachi Station (上本町駅) on 20 March 2009, when it started being served by trains on the Hanshin Namba Line.

== Layout ==
- The station has two side platforms serving two tracks on the third basement level, and seven bay platforms serving six tracks on the first floor.

A Nara Line, Namba Line (Underground platforms)
Track	Direction	Destinations
1	Eastbound	for Kintetsu Nara, Kintetsu Nagoya, and Kashikojima (Including limited express trains starting Osaka Namba)
2	Westbound	for Ōsaka Namba and Kobe Sannomiya (via the Hanshin Namba Line)
D Osaka Line (Ground platforms)
Track	Direction	Destinations
3 - 9	Eastbound	for Kawachi-Kokubu, Isuzugawa, and Toba (Starting this station) (Limited express trains mainly depart from Track 9.)

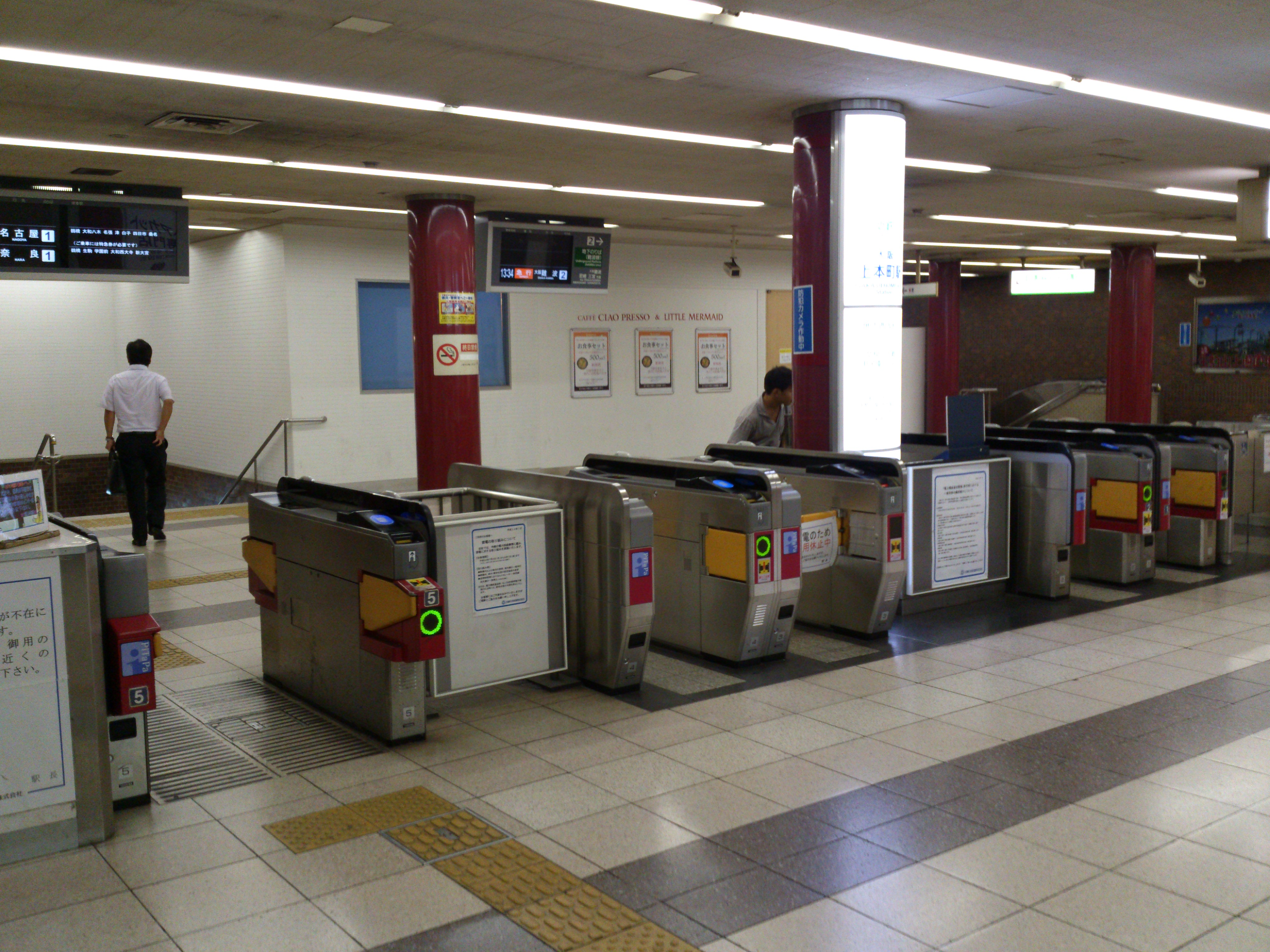
West ticket gates

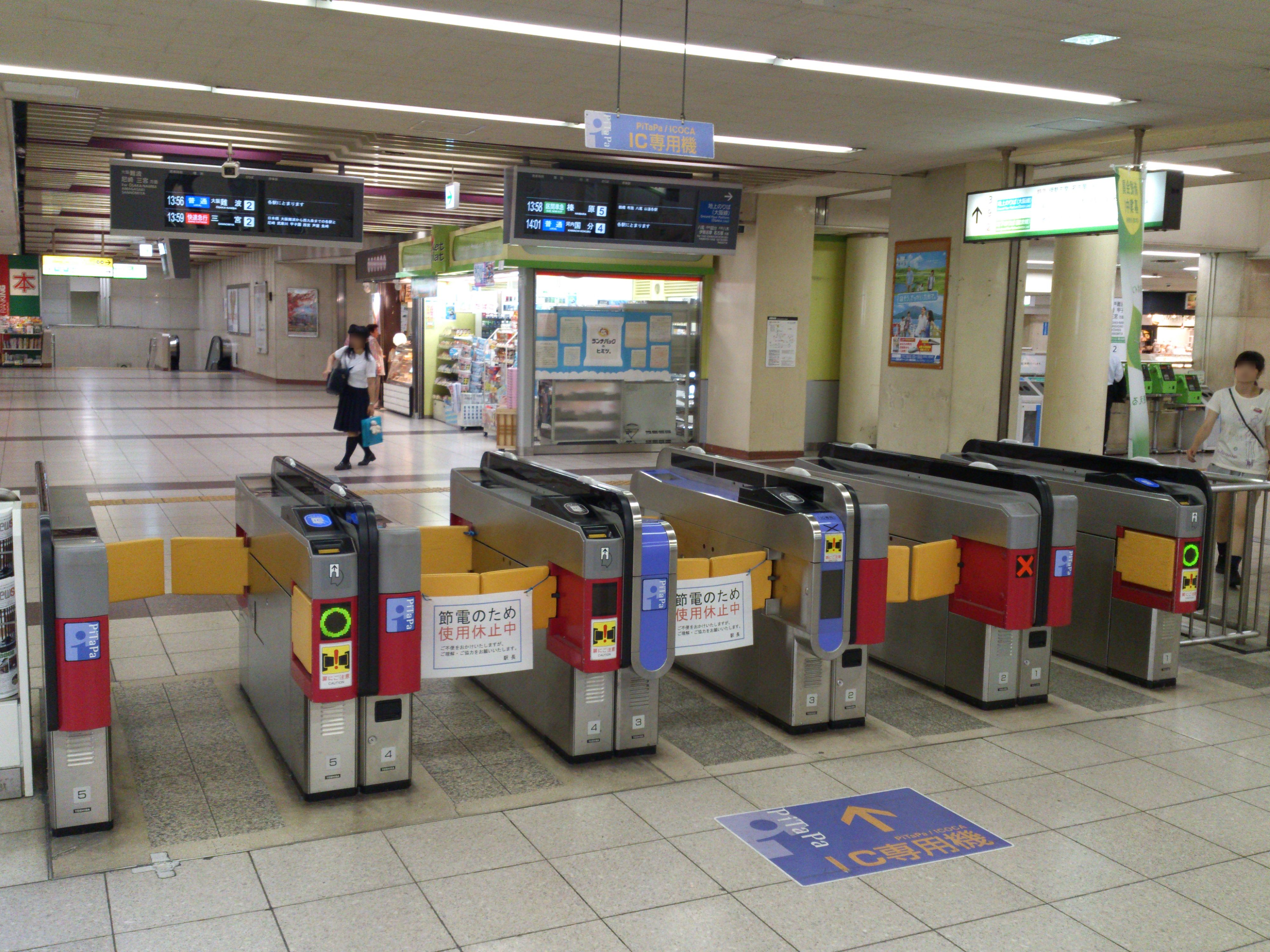
Central ticket gates

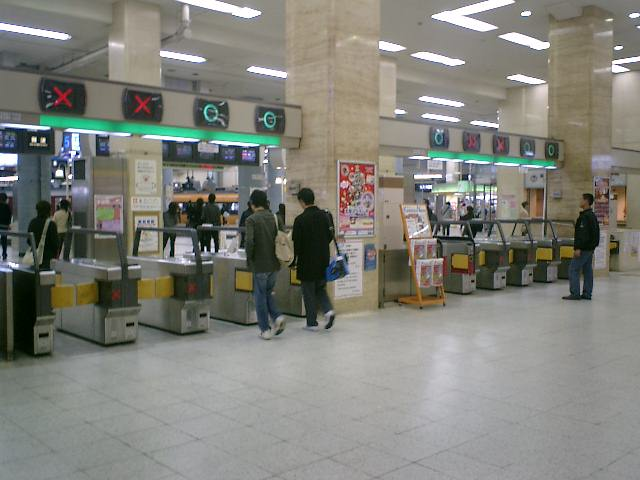
Ground ticket gates

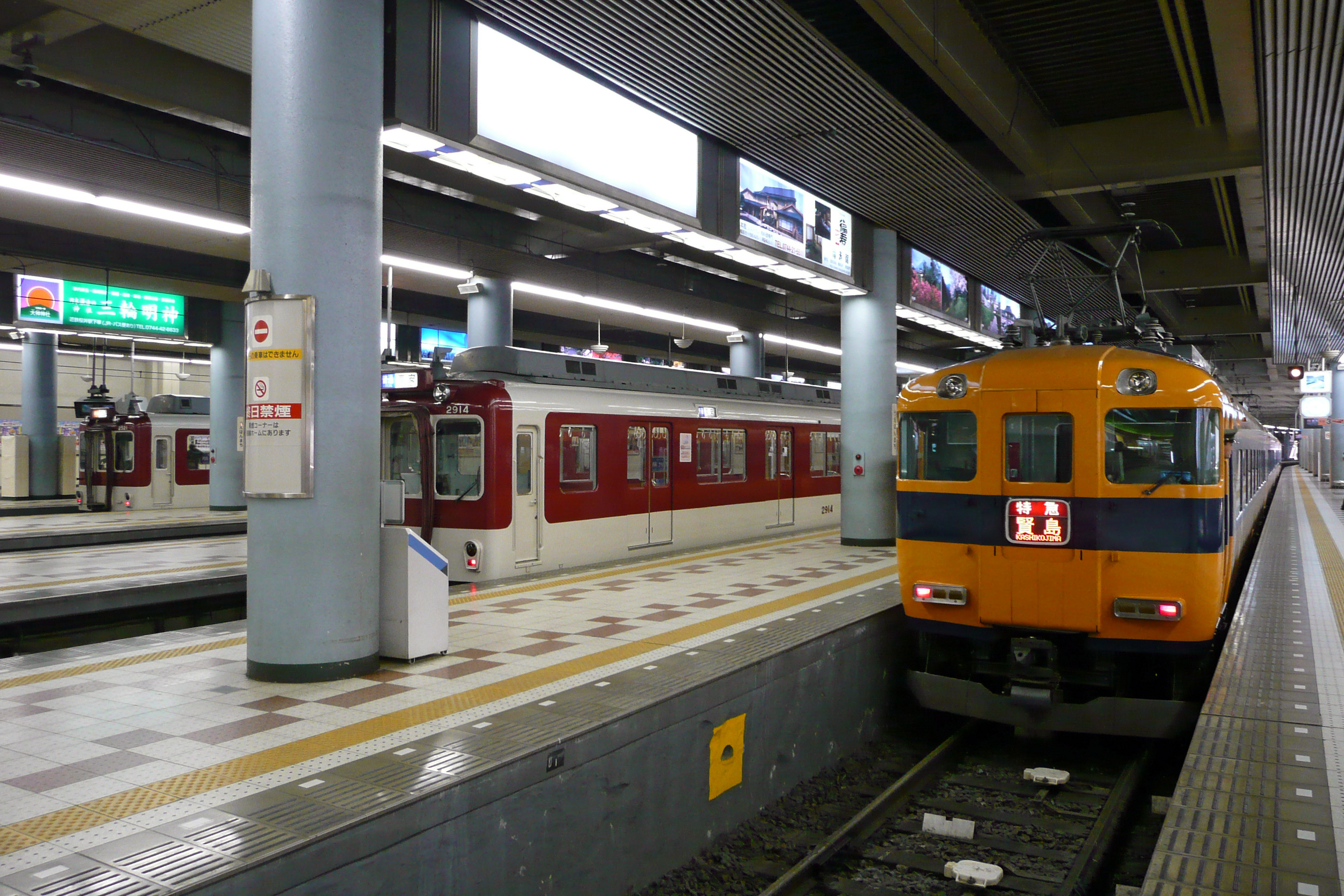
Platform of first floor

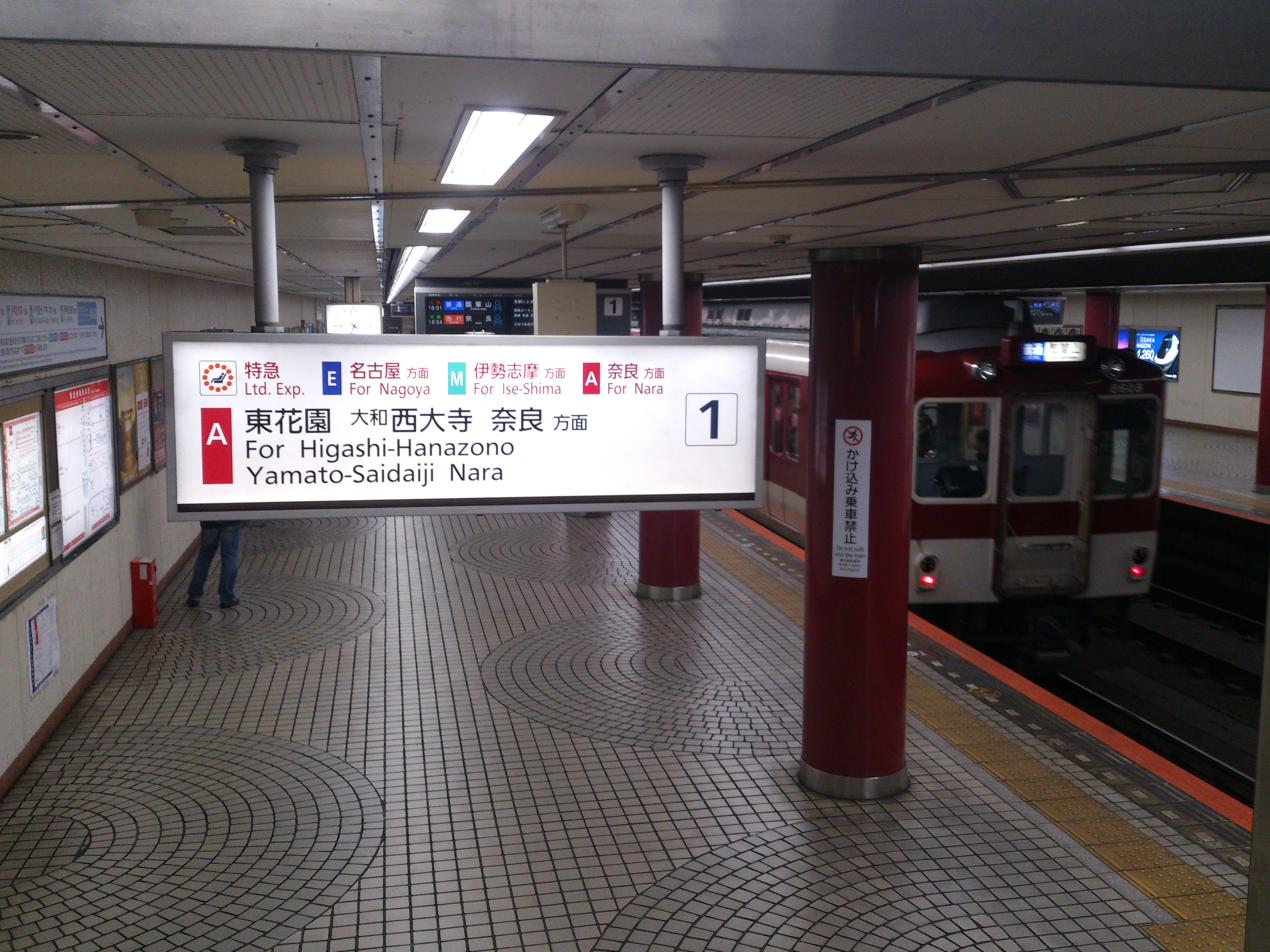
Underground platforms

== Surroundings ==
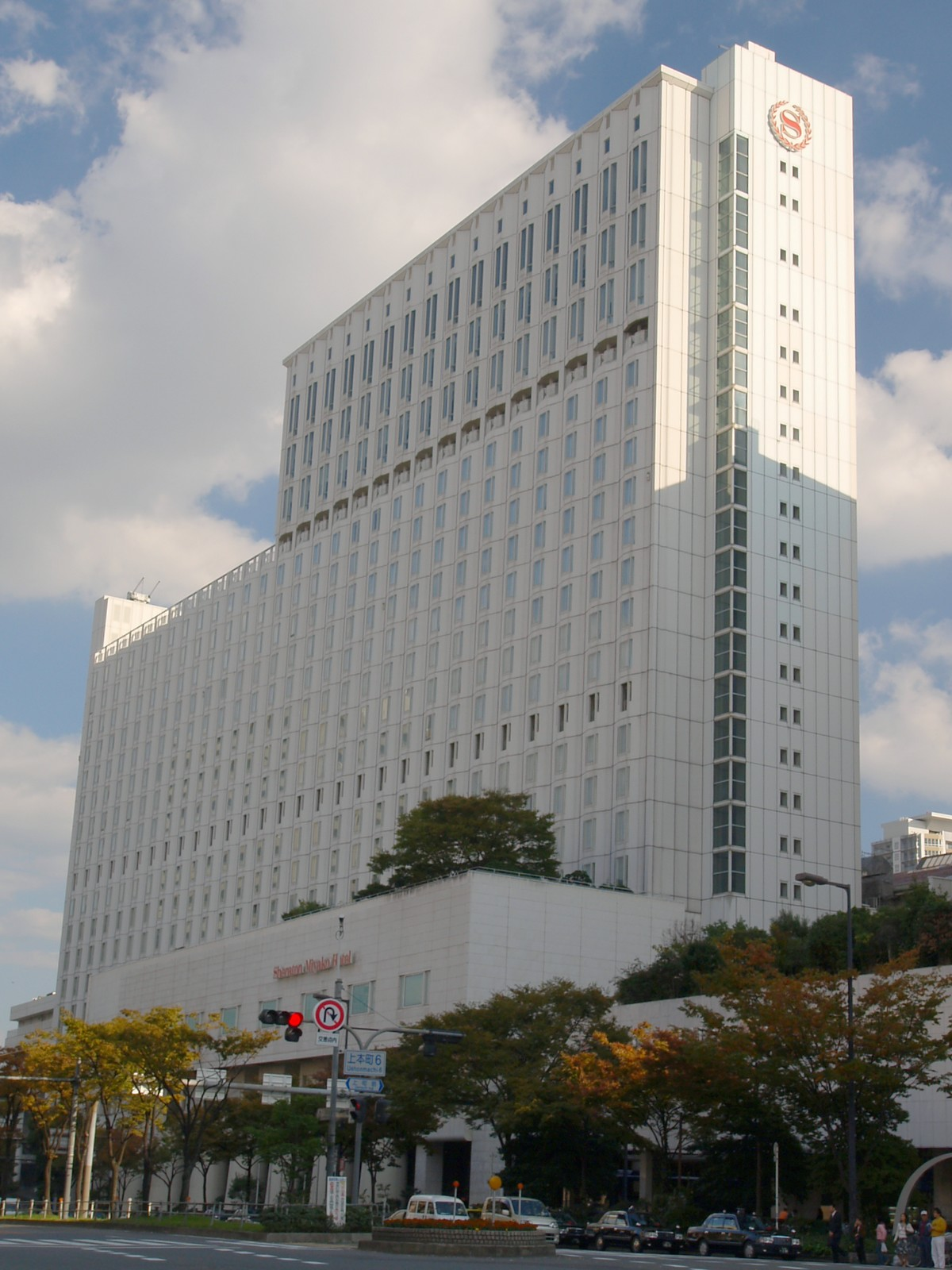
Sheraton Miyako Hotel Osaka

- the headquarters of Kintetsu Group
- Kintetsu Department Store Uehommachi
- Uehommachi Yufura
  - Shinkabukiza
- Sheraton Miyako Hotel Osaka
- Uehommachi Hi-Hi Town
- Oaska Red Cross Hospital
- Tanimachi Kyuchome Station (Osaka Metro)
- International House, Osaka
- Hotel Awina Osaka
- Uenomiya Junior/Senior High School
- Seifu Junior/Senior High School

=== Buses ===
Osaka City Bus
Uehommachi Rokuchome

Route 18 for Kita-Tatsumi Bus Terminal via Miyukidori / for Tamatsukuri via Uehommachi Itchome
Route 22 for Suwa Jinja-mae via Tsuruhashi-ekimae and Tamatsukuri / for Abenobashi via Tennoji Kumin Center and Tennoji Kuyakusho
Route 62 for Sumiyoshishako-mae via Uehommachi Hatchome and Abenobashi / for Osaka-ekimae (Osaka Station) via Temmabashi
Route 73 for Deto Bus Terminal via Katsuyama Yonchome and Kumata / for Namba

Uehommachi Rokuchome-minami

Route 62 for Abenobashi and Sumiyoshishako-mae via Uehommachi Hatchome / for Osaka-ekimae (Osaka Station) via Temmabashi

Uehommachi Rokuchome-higashi

Route 18 for Kita-Tatsumi Bus Terminal via Miyukidori
Route 22 for Suwa Jinja-mae via Tsuruhashi-ekimae and Tamatsukuri
Route 73 for Deto Bus Terminal via Katsuyama Yonchome and Kumata

Uehommachi Nanachome-kita

Route 62 for Uehommachi Rokuchome-minami and Osaka-ekimae (Osaka Station)

Kintetsu Bus Co., Ltd.
from the south of the station (Kintetsu Uehommachi Station)

Route 01 for Osaka Red Cross Hospital (Not running on Saturdays, Sundays, holidays, May 1 and from December 29 until January 3)
Route 66 for JR Momodani Station via Osaka Police Hospital (Not running on Saturdays, Sundays, holidays, and from December 30 until January 4)

Abeno-Uehommachi Shuttle Buses from Sheraton Miyako Hotel Osaka (Kintetsu Uehommachi)

Route 10 for Abenobashi (Abeno Harukas) via Shitenno-ji Sandoguchi
Route 11 for Abenobashi (Abeno Harukas) via Matsuyamachi-suji Avenue (7 buses per day, 10:05 a.m., 11:05 a.m., 12:05 p.m., 1:05 p.m., 2:05 p.m., 3:05 p.m. and 4:05 p.m. buses)
Route 12 for Abenobashi-higashiguchi (Miyako City Osaka Tennoji) via Shitenno-ji Sandoguchi (from the 7:35 p.m. bus until the last one)

Airport limousine (Kintetsu Uehommachi)
for Osaka International Airport (departing from bus station on the 2nd floor of Ōsaka Uehommachi Station; operated by Osaka Airport Transport Co., Ltd.)
for Kansai International Airport (departing from Sheraton Miyako Hotel Osaka; operated by Kintetsu Bus Co., Ltd. and Kansai Airport Transportation Enterprise Co., Ltd.)

Tour bus (Kintetsu Bus Co., Ltd.)
Osaka Sky Vista (departing from bus station on the 2nd floor of Ōsaka Uehommachi Station)

From the starting in 2014, Osaka Sky Vista started Uehommachi and passed Osaka Museum of History, Osaka Castle, Nakanoshima, Midosuji, Dotombori, Den Den Town, Tsutenkaku and Shitenno-ji. It does not run on Wednesdays. Passengers could get off at Abeno Harukas or Uehommachi. Osaka Sky Vista has started from JR Osaka Station since February 1, 2016.

== Adjacent stations ==
«	Service	»
Kintetsu Railway
Osaka Line (D03)
Terminus	Local	Tsuruhashi (D04)
Terminus	Semi-Express; Suburban Semi-Express	Tsuruhashi (D04)
Terminus	Express	Tsuruhashi (D04)
Terminus	Rapid Express	Tsuruhashi (D04)
Terminus	Limited Express (Ōsaka Uehommachi - Toba, Kashikojima)	Tsuruhashi (D04)
Namba Line-Nara Line (A03)
Kintetsu Nippombashi (A02)	Local	Tsuruhashi (A04)
Kintetsu Nippombashi (A02)	Semi-Express; Suburban Semi-Express	Tsuruhashi (A04)
Kintetsu Nippombashi (A02)	Express	Tsuruhashi (A04)
Kintetsu Nippombashi (A02)	Rapid Express	Tsuruhashi (A04)
Ōsaka Namba (A01)	Limited Express (including the Osaka Line limited express trains to and from Ōsaka Namba)	Tsuruhashi (A04)
