= Obitoke Station =

Railway station in Nara, Nara Prefecture, Japan

Obitoke Station 帯解駅
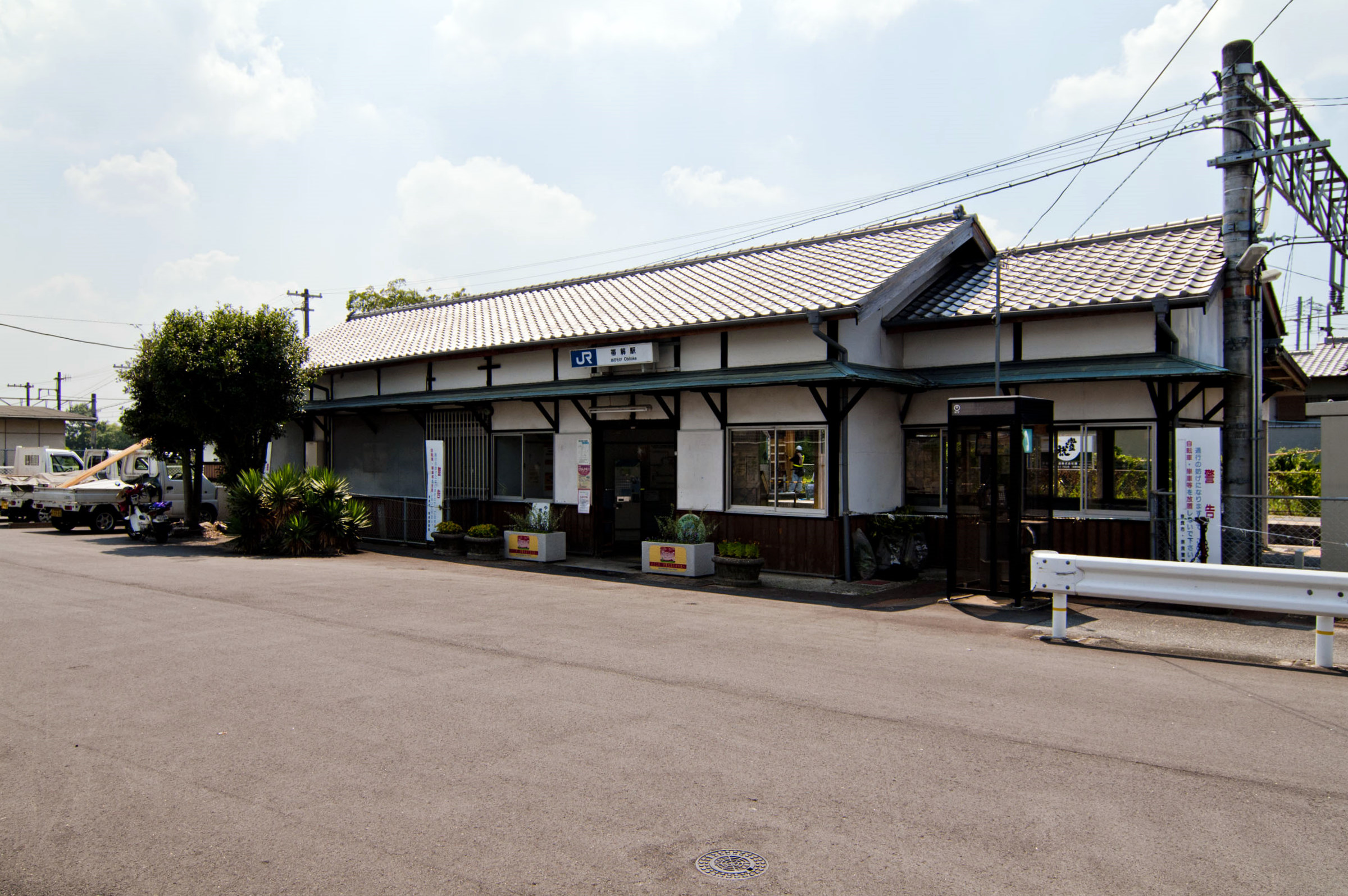
- Obitoke Station

General information
- Location: 250 Imaichichō 1-chōme, Nara-shi, Nara-ken 630-8444; Japan
- Coordinates: 34°38′36″N 135°49′35″E
- System: JR-West commuter rail station
- Owner: West Japan Railway Company (JR-West)
- Operator: Unstaffed
- Lines: Passenger train services: U Man-yō Mahoroba Line; Railway track: Sakurai Line
- Distance: 4.8 km (3.0 miles) from Nara
- Platforms: 2 side platforms
- Tracks: 2
- Train operators: JR-West
- Connections: None

Construction
- Structure type: At grade
- Parking: None
- Cycle facilities: Available
- Accessible: None

Other information
- Website: (in Japanese)

History
- Opened: 11 May 1898

Passengers
- FY2020: 381 daily
Services
Preceding station	JRW	Following station
U Man-yō Mahoroba Line
Kyōbate toward Nara	Local	Ichinomoto toward Wakayama, Ōji, Takada, and Sakurai
Kyōbate; One-way	Rapid Service	Ichinomoto toward JR Namba
Location
- Location within Nara Prefecture Location within Japan

Obitoke Station (帯解駅, Obitoke-eki) is a passenger railway station located in the city of Nara, Nara, Japan. It is operated by West Japan Railway Company (JR West).

== Lines ==
Although the station is on the Sakurai Line as rail infrastructure, it has been served by the Man-yō Mahoroba Line since 2010 in terms of passenger train services. It is 4.8 kilometers from the starting point of the line at Nara.

== Layout ==
Obitoke Station is an above-ground station with two opposed side platforms connected by a footbridge. The station is unattended.

=== Platforms ===
1	■ Man-yō Mahoroba Line—Local	for Nara
2	■ Man-yō Mahoroba Line—Local	for Wakayama, Ōji, Takada, and Sakurai
2	■ Man-yō Mahoroba Line—Rapid Service	for JR Namba

== History ==
Obitoke Station opened on 11 May 1898 when Nara Railway opened between Kyogoku Station and Sakurai Station. The Kansai Railway and the Nara Railway merged in 1905 and were nationalized in 1907. With the privatization of the Japan National Railways (JNR) on April 1, 1987, the station came under the control of West Japan Railway Company (JR West).

== Passenger statistics ==
The average daily passenger traffic in fiscal 2020 was 381 passengers.

== Surrounding area ==
- Obitoke Elementary School
- Nara City Tsunan Junior High School

== See also ==
- List of railway stations in Japan
