= Nagara Station =

Railway station in Tenri, Nara Prefecture, Japan

Nagara Station 長柄駅
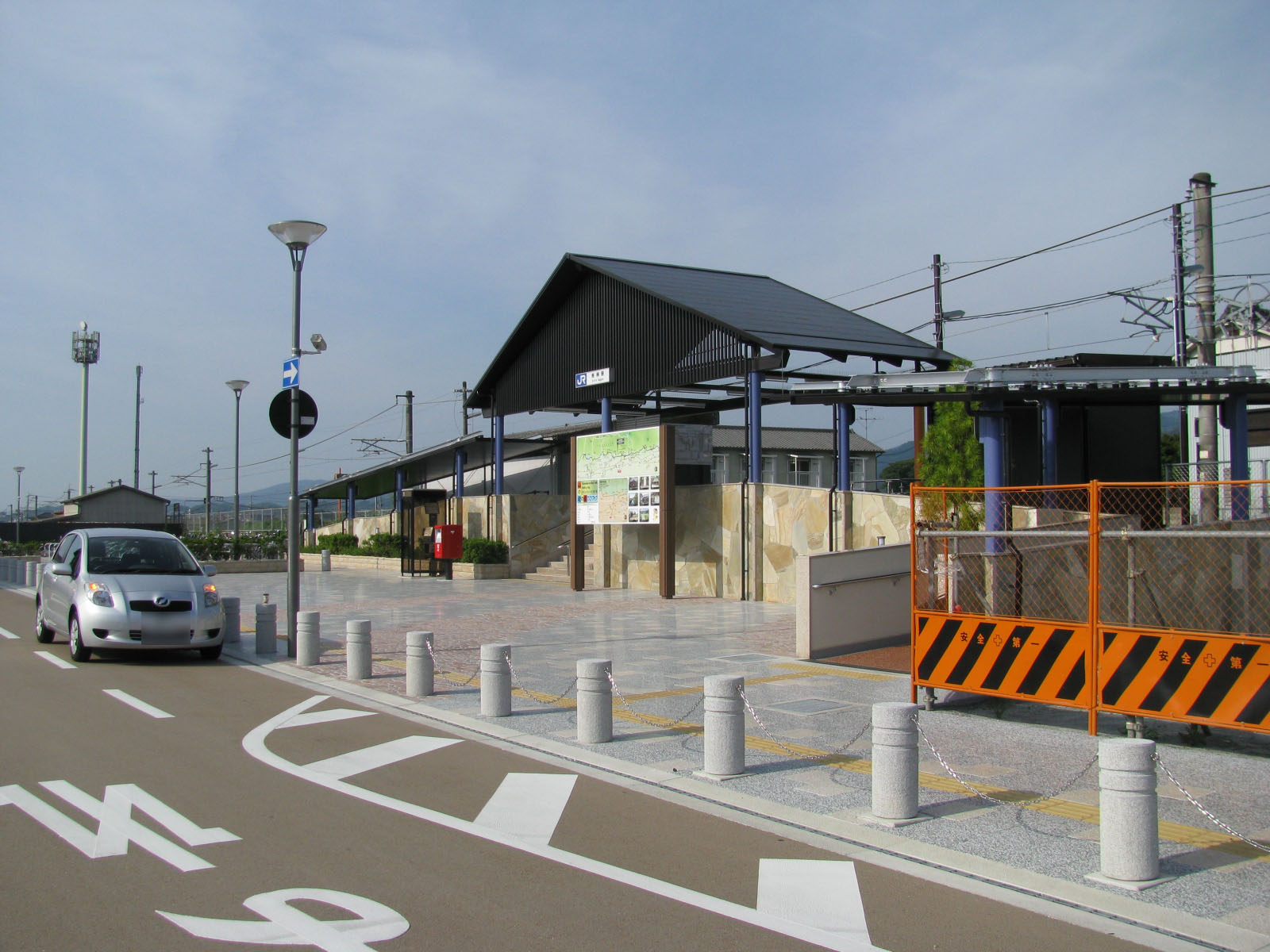
- Nagara Station

General information
- Location: 176-3, Hyōgochō, Tenri-shi, Nara-ken 632-0044; Japan
- Coordinates: 34°34′25″N 135°50′06″E
- System: JR-West commuter rail station
- Owner: West Japan Railway Company (JR-West)
- Operator: Unstaffed
- Lines: Passenger train services: U Man-yō Mahoroba Line; Railway track: Sakurai Line
- Distance: 12.6 km (7.8 miles) from Nara
- Platforms: 1 side platform
- Tracks: 1
- Train operators: JR-West
- Connections: None

Construction
- Structure type: At grade
- Parking: None
- Cycle facilities: Available
- Accessible: None

Other information
- Website: http://www.jr-odekake.net/eki/top.php?id=0621705

History
- Opened: 20 August 1914

Passengers
- 2020: 440 daily
Services
Preceding station	JRW	Following station
U Man-yō Mahoroba Line
Tenri toward Nara	Local	Yanagimoto toward Wakayama, Ōji, Takada, and Sakurai
Tenri; One-way	Rapid Service	Yanagimoto toward JR Namba
Location
- Location within Nara Prefecture Location within Kansai region Location within Japan

Nagara Station (長柄駅, Nagara-eki) is a passenger railway station located in the city of Tenri, Nara, Japan. It is operated by West Japan Railway Company (JR West).

== Lines ==
Although the station is on the Sakurai Line as rail infrastructure, it has been served by the Man-yō Mahoroba Line since 2010 in terms of passenger train services. It is 12.6 kilometers from the starting point of the line at Nara.

== Layout ==
The station is an above-ground station with one side platform serving bi-directional traffic, with the platform on the right side facing towards Sakurai. The station is unattended.

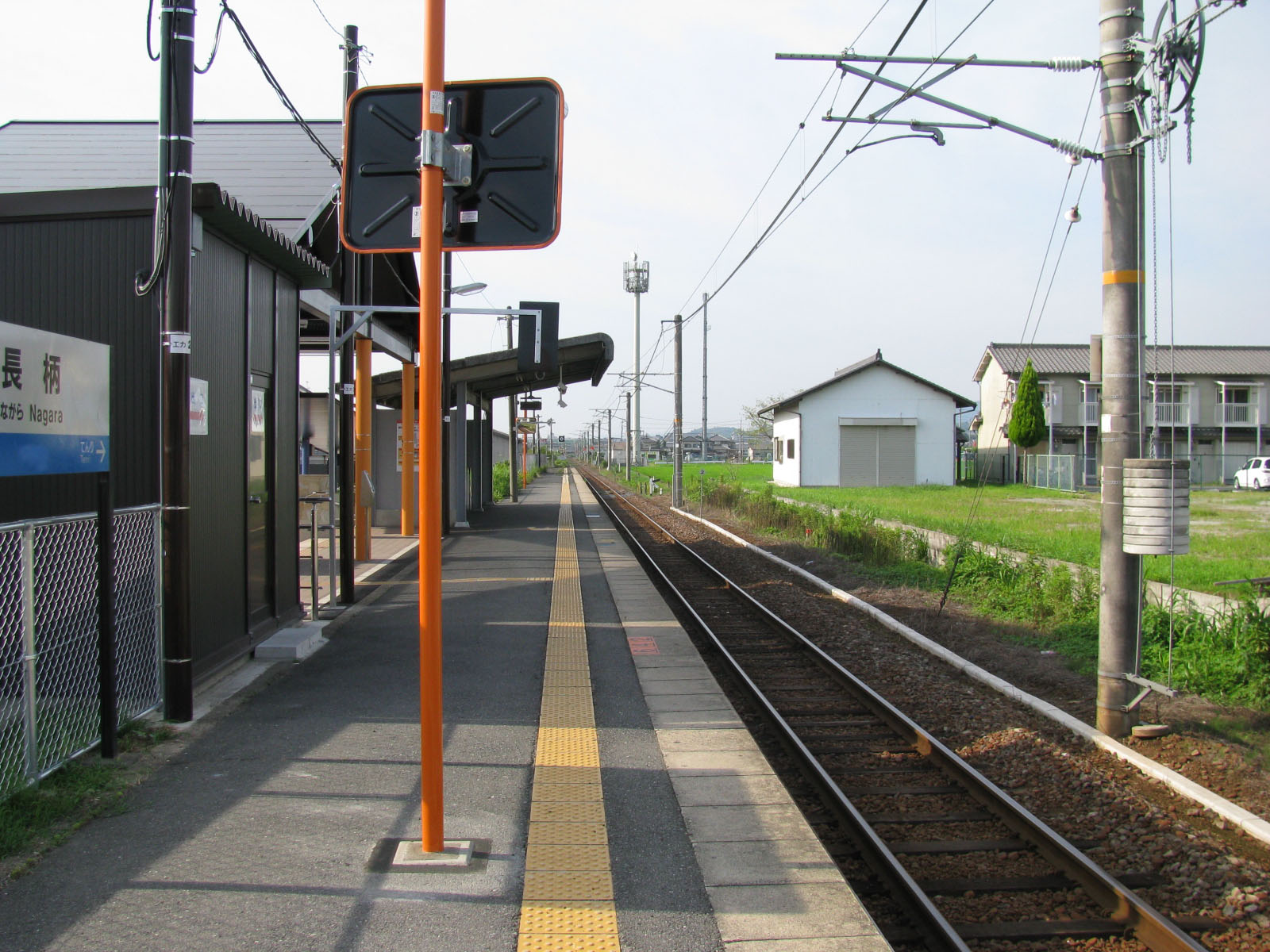
Platform

== History ==
Nagara Station was opened on 20 August 1914. With the privatization of the Japan National Railways (JNR) on 1 April 1987, the station was transferred to JR West. The station building was transferred to the city of Tenri in 2019, and was remodeled to include a cafe and retail spaces.

== Passenger statistics ==
The average daily passenger traffic in fiscal 2020 was 440 passengers.。

== Surrounding area ==
- Ōyamato Shrine
- Birth home of Nakayama Miki
- Nara Football Center

== See also ==
- List of railway stations in Japan
