= Ichinomoto Station =

Railway station in Tenri, Nara Prefecture, Japan

Ichinomoto Station 櫟本駅
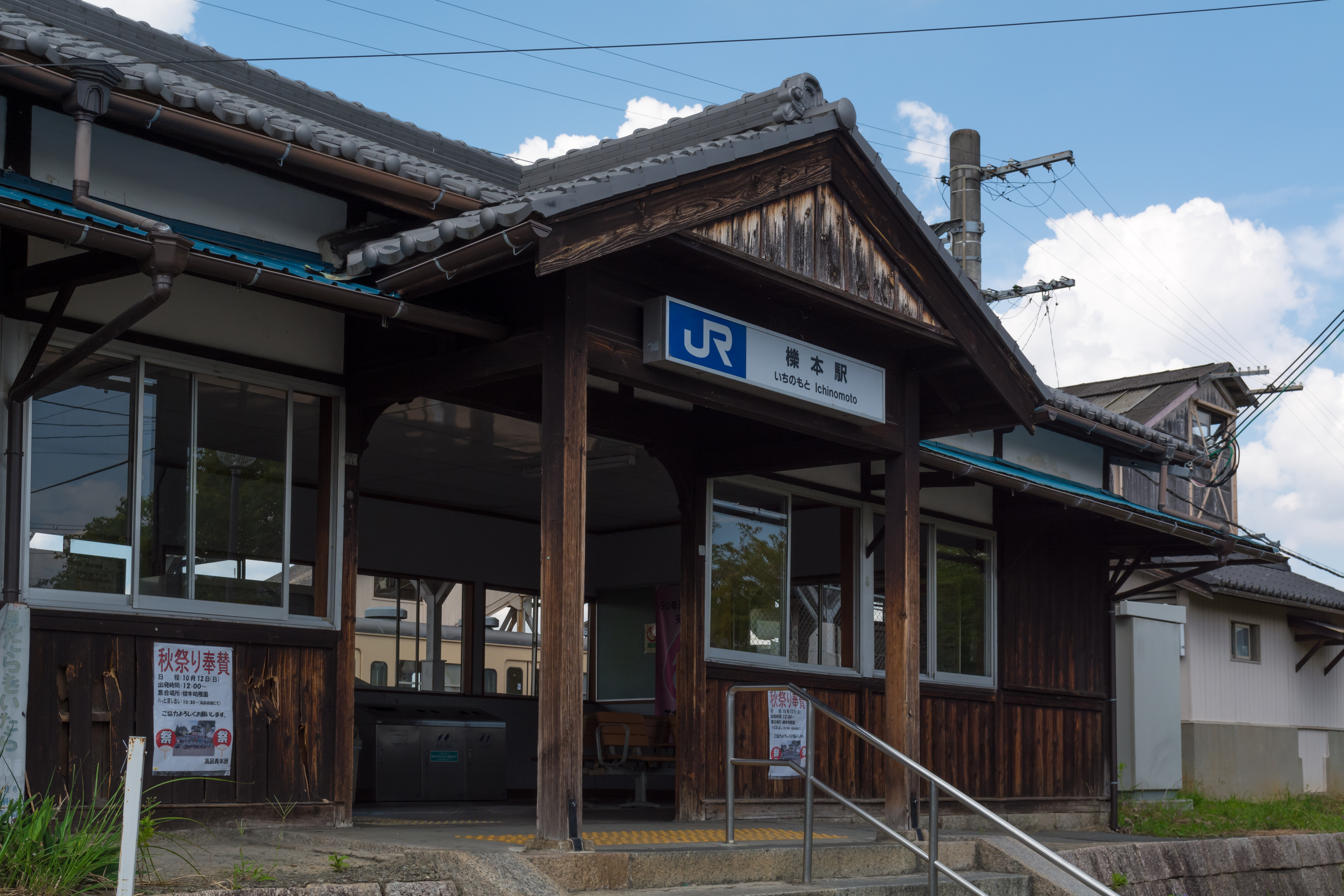
- The station building

General information
- Location: 1418, Kawaragama, Ichinomotochō, Tenri-shi, Nara-ken 632-0004; Japan
- Coordinates: 34°37′16″N 135°49′35″E
- System: JR-West commuter rail station
- Owner: West Japan Railway Company (JR-West)
- Operator: Unstaffed
- Lines: Passenger train services: U Man-yō Mahoroba Line; Railway track: Sakurai Line
- Distance: 7.3 km (4.5 miles) from Nara
- Platforms: 2 side platforms
- Tracks: 2
- Train operators: JR-West
- Connections: None

Construction
- Structure type: At grade
- Parking: None
- Cycle facilities: Available
- Accessible: None

Other information
- Website: www.jr-odekake.net/eki/top.php?id=0621703 (in Japanese)

History
- Opened: 11 May 1898

Passengers
- FY2019: 689 daily
Services
Preceding station	JRW	Following station
U Man-yō Mahoroba Line
Obitoke toward Nara	Local	Tenri toward Wakayama, Ōji, Takada, and Sakurai
Obitoke; One-way	Rapid Service	Tenri toward JR Namba
Location
- Location within Nara Prefecture Location within Japan

Ichinomoto Station (櫟本駅, Ichinomoto-eki) is a passenger railway station located in the city of Tenri, Nara, Japan. It is operated by West Japan Railway Company (JR West) and is administrated by Ōji Station.

== Lines ==
Although the station is on the Sakurai Line as rail infrastructure, it has been served by the Man-yō Mahoroba Line since 2010 in terms of passenger train services. It is 7.3 kilometers from the starting point of the line at Nara.

== Layout ==
Makimuku Station is an above-ground station with two opposed side platforms connected by a footbridge. The platform on the side of the station facing towards Takada. The station is unattended.

=== Platforms ===
1	■ Man-yō Mahoroba Line—Local	for Nara
2	■ Man-yō Mahoroba Line—Local	for Wakayama, Ōji, Takada, and Sakurai
2	■ Man-yō Mahoroba Line—Rapid Service	for JR Namba

== History ==
Ichinomoto Station opened on 11 May 1898 when Nara Railway opened its line between Kyogoku Station and Sakurai Station. The Kansai Railway merged with the Nara Railway in 1905 and was nationalized in 1907. With the privatization of the Japan National Railways (JNR) on April 1, 1987, the station came under the control of West Japan Railway Company (JR West).

== Passenger statistics ==
The average daily passenger traffic in fiscal 2020 was 689 passengers.

== Surrounding area ==
- Nara Prefectural Soegami High School
- Tenri City Ichinomoto Elementary School

== See also ==
- List of railway stations in Japan
