= Kaguyama Station =

Railway station in Kashihara, Nara Prefecture, Japan

Kaguyama Station 香久山駅
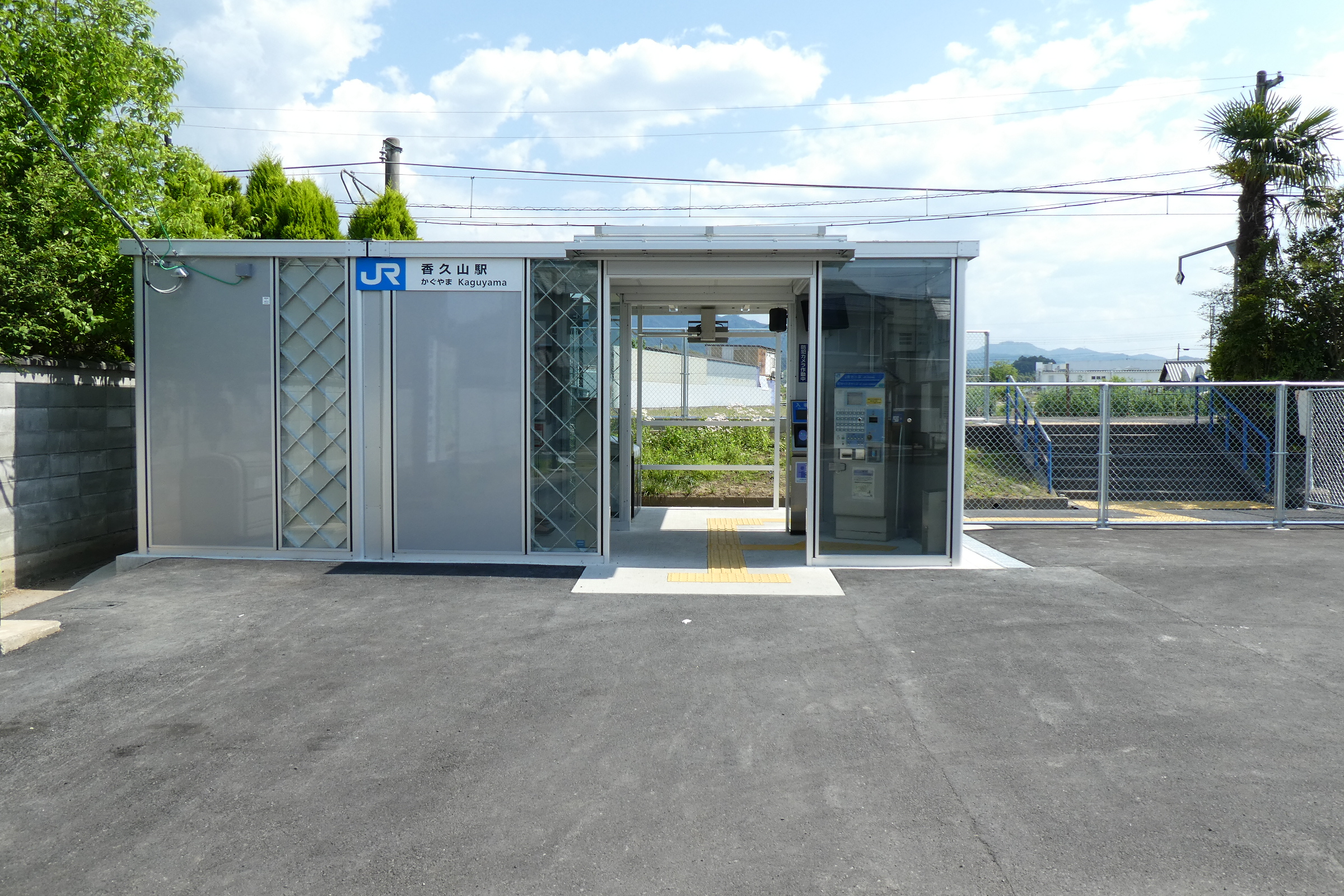
- Kaguyama Station—May 2019

General information
- Location: 51, Degaitochō, Kashihara-shi, Nara-ken 634-0011; Japan
- Coordinates: 34°30′39″N 135°49′30″E
- System: JR-West commuter rail station
- Owner: West Japan Railway Company (JR-West)
- Operator: Unstaffed
- Lines: Passenger train services: U Man-yō Mahoroba Line; Railway track: Sakurai Line
- Distance: 21.7 km (13.5 miles) from Nara via Sakurai
- Platforms: 1 side platform
- Tracks: 1
- Train operators: JR-West
- Connections: None

Construction
- Structure type: At grade
- Parking: None
- Cycle facilities: Available
- Accessible: None

Other information
- Website: https://www.jr-odekake.net/eki/top.php?id=0621710

History
- Opened: 21 April 1913

Passengers
- 2022: 171 daily
Services
Preceding station	JRW	Following station
U Man-yō Mahoroba Line
Unebi toward Wakayama and Ōji	Local	Sakurai toward Nara
Unebi toward JR Namba	Rapid Service	Sakurai; One-way
Location
- Location within Nara Prefecture Location within Japan

Kaguyama Station (香久山駅, Kaguyama-eki) is a passenger railway station located in the city of Kashihara, Nara, Japan. It is operated by West Japan Railway Company (JR West).

== Lines ==
Although the station is on the Sakurai Line as rail infrastructure, it has been served by the Man-yō Mahoroba Line since 2010 in terms of passenger train services. It is 21.7 kilometers from the starting point of the line at Nara.

== Layout ==
Kaguyama Station is an above-ground station with one side platform serving a single bi-directional track. There is a station building on the right side when facing towards Takada. The station is unattended.

== History ==
Kaguyama Station opened on 21 April 1913. With the privatization of the Japan National Railways (JNR) on April 1, 1987, the station came under the control of West Japan Railway Company (JR West).

== Passenger statistics ==
The average daily passenger traffic in fiscal 2022 was 171 passengers.

== Surrounding area ==
- Mount Amanokagu
- Daifuku Station (Kintetsu Osaka Line)

== See also ==
- List of railway stations in Japan
