= Unebi Station =

Railway station in Kashihara, Nara Prefecture, Japan

Unebi Station 畝傍駅
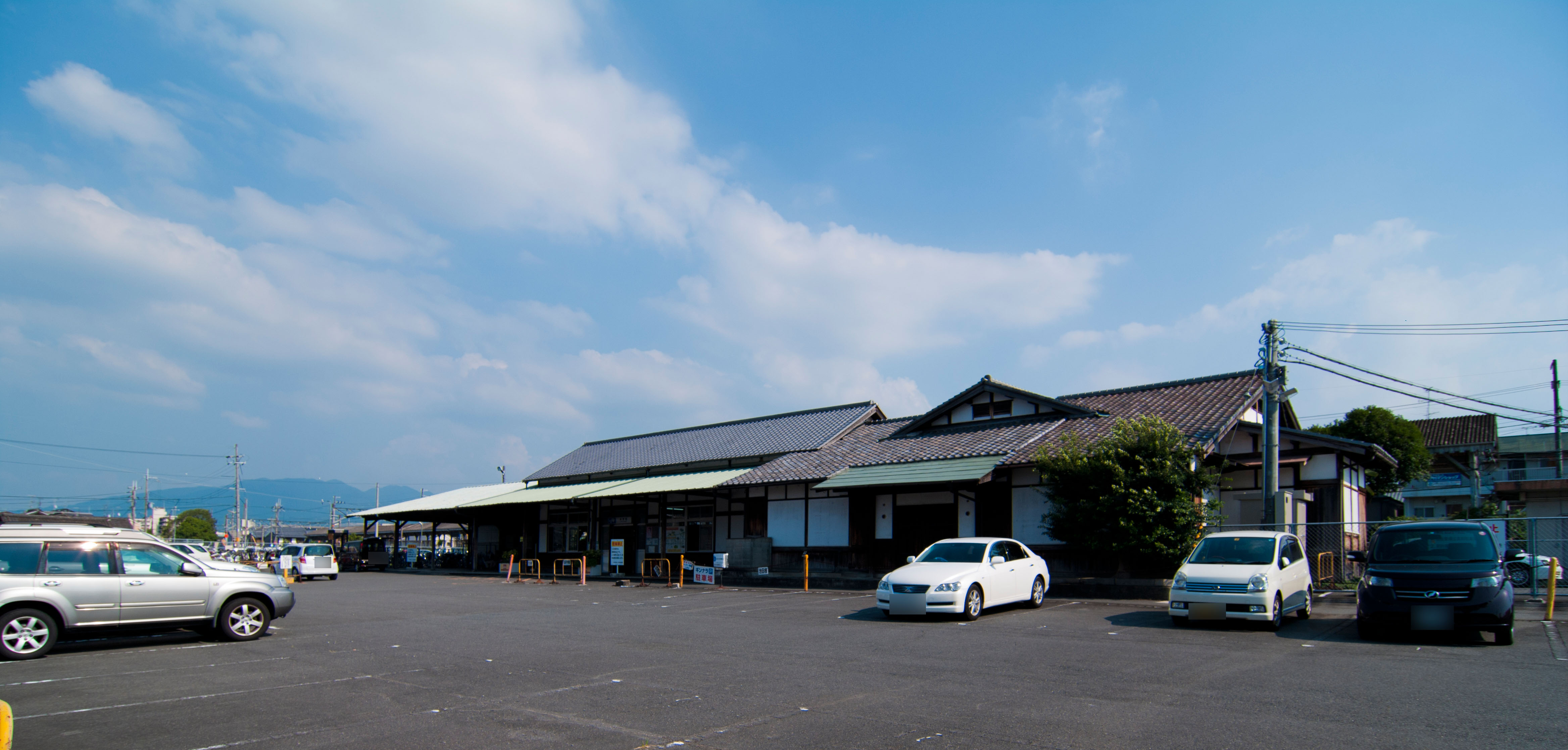
- The station building

General information
- Location: 1-9, Yagi-chō 2-chōme, Kashihara-shi, Nara-ken 634-0078; Japan
- Coordinates: 34°30′30″N 135°47′37″E
- System: JR-West commuter rail station
- Owner: West Japan Railway Company (JR-West)
- Operator: Unstaffed
- Lines: Passenger train services: U Man-yō Mahoroba Line; Railway track: Sakurai Line
- Distance: 24.7 km (15.3 miles) from Nara via Sakurai
- Platforms: 2 side platforms
- Tracks: 2
- Train operators: JR-West
- Connections: None

Construction
- Structure type: At grade
- Parking: None
- Cycle facilities: Available
- Accessible: None

Other information
- Website: http://www.jr-odekake.net/eki/top.php?id=0621711

History
- Opened: 23 May 1893

Passengers
- 2022: 504 daily
Services
Preceding station	JRW	Following station
U Man-yō Mahoroba Line
Kanahashi toward Wakayama and Ōji	Local	Kaguyama toward Nara
Kanahashi toward JR Namba	Rapid Service	Kaguyama; One-way
Location
- Location within Nara Prefecture Location within Kansai region Location within Japan

Unebi Station (畝傍駅, Unebi-eki) is a passenger railway station located in the city of Kashihara, Nara, Japan. It is operated by West Japan Railway Company (JR West). The station is a transfer point to Yagi-nishiguchi Station on the Kintetsu Kashihara Line.

== Lines ==
Although the station is on the Sakurai Line as rail infrastructure, it has been served by the Man-yō Mahoroba Line since 2010 in terms of passenger train services. It is 24.7 kilometers from the starting point of the line at Nara.

== Layout ==
As built, the station had one side platform and one island platform, but after December 2005, the tracks at the southern end have been removed (the overhead lines remain only on the western side, but not on the eastern side), and the station is now an above-ground station with two side platforms and two tracks. The station building is located on the No. 1 (upbound) platform side, and is connected to No. 2 (downbound) platform by a footbridge. The platform is located higher than the station building, and the station building and the platform are connected by stairs and a slope. The station is unattended.

=== Platforms ===
1	■ Man-yō Mahoroba Line—Local	for Nara
2	■ Man-yō Mahoroba Line—Local	for Wakayama, Ōji, and Takada
2	■ Man-yō Mahoroba Line—Rapid Service	for JR Namba

== History ==
Unebi Station opened on 23 May 1893 as a station on the Osaka Railway. The Osaka Railway merged into the Kansai Railway in 1900 and was nationalized in 1907. From 1924 to 1952, the station was also serviced by the Kintetsu Kobo Line. With the privatization of the Japan National Railways (JNR) on April 1, 1987, the station came under the control of West Japan Railway Company (JR West).

== Passenger statistics ==
The average daily passenger traffic in fiscal 2022 was 504 passengers.577

== Surrounding area ==
- Yamato-Yagi Station
- Yagi-nishiguchi Station
- Ofusa Kannon
- Imai-chō
- Nara Medical University

== See also ==
- List of railway stations in Japan
