= Miwa Station =

Railway station in Sakurai, Nara Prefecture, Japan

Miwa Station 三輪駅
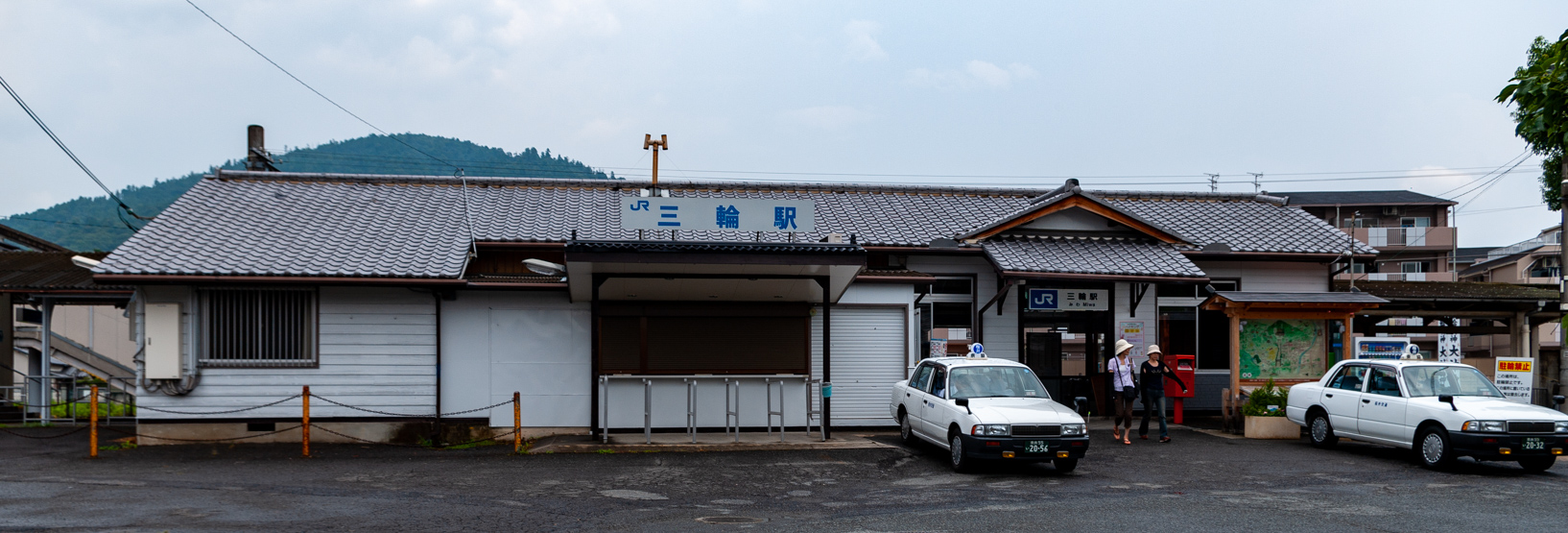
- Station building

General information
- Location: Ōaza Miwa, Sakurai-shi, Nara-ken 633-0001; Japan
- Coordinates: 34°31′38″N 135°50′54″E
- System: JR-West commuter rail station
- Owner: West Japan Railway Company (JR-West)
- Operator: Unstaffed
- Lines: Passenger train services: U Man-yō Mahoroba Line; Railway track: Sakurai Line
- Distance: 18.0 km (11.2 miles) from Nara
- Platforms: 1 side platform and 1 converted side platform
- Tracks: 2
- Train operators: JR-West
- Connections: None

Construction
- Structure type: At grade
- Parking: None
- Cycle facilities: Available

Other information
- Website: http://www.jr-odekake.net/eki/top.php?id=0621708

History
- Opened: 11 May 1898

Passengers
- 2020: 715 daily
Services
Preceding station	JRW	Following station
U Man-yō Mahoroba Line
Makimuku toward Nara	Local	Sakurai toward Wakayama, Ōji, and Takada
Makimuku toward Nara	Local	Sakurai; Terminus
Makimuku; One-way	Rapid Service	Sakurai toward JR Namba
Location
- Location within Nara Prefecture Location within Japan

Miwa Station (三輪駅, Miwa-eki) is a passenger railway station located in the city of Sakurai, Nara, Japan. It is operated by West Japan Railway Company (JR West).

== Lines ==
Although the station is on the Sakurai Line as rail infrastructure, it has been served by the Man-yō Mahoroba Line since 2010 in terms of passenger train services. It is 18.0 kilometers from the starting point of the line at Nara.

== Layout ==
Miwa Station is an above-ground station with two side platforms and two tracks, allowing trains to pass each other, and the effective length of the platform can accommodate up to six cars. There is a station building on the No. 1 (upbound) platform side, and an footbridge connects to No. 2 (downbound) platform.. The station is unattended.

=== Platforms ===
1	■ Man-yō Mahoroba Line—Local	for Nara
2	■ Man-yō Mahoroba Line—Local	for Wakayama, Ōji, Takada, and Sakurai
2	■ Man-yō Mahoroba Line—Rapid Service	for JR Namba

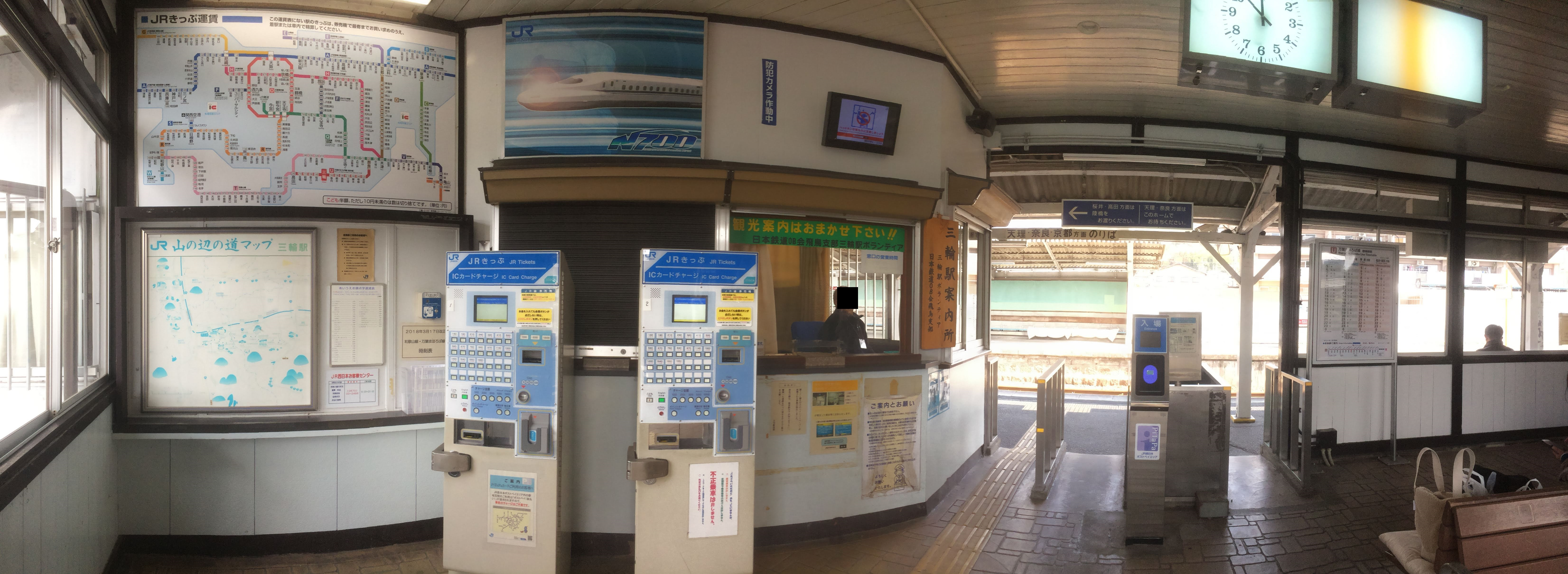
Ticket Office

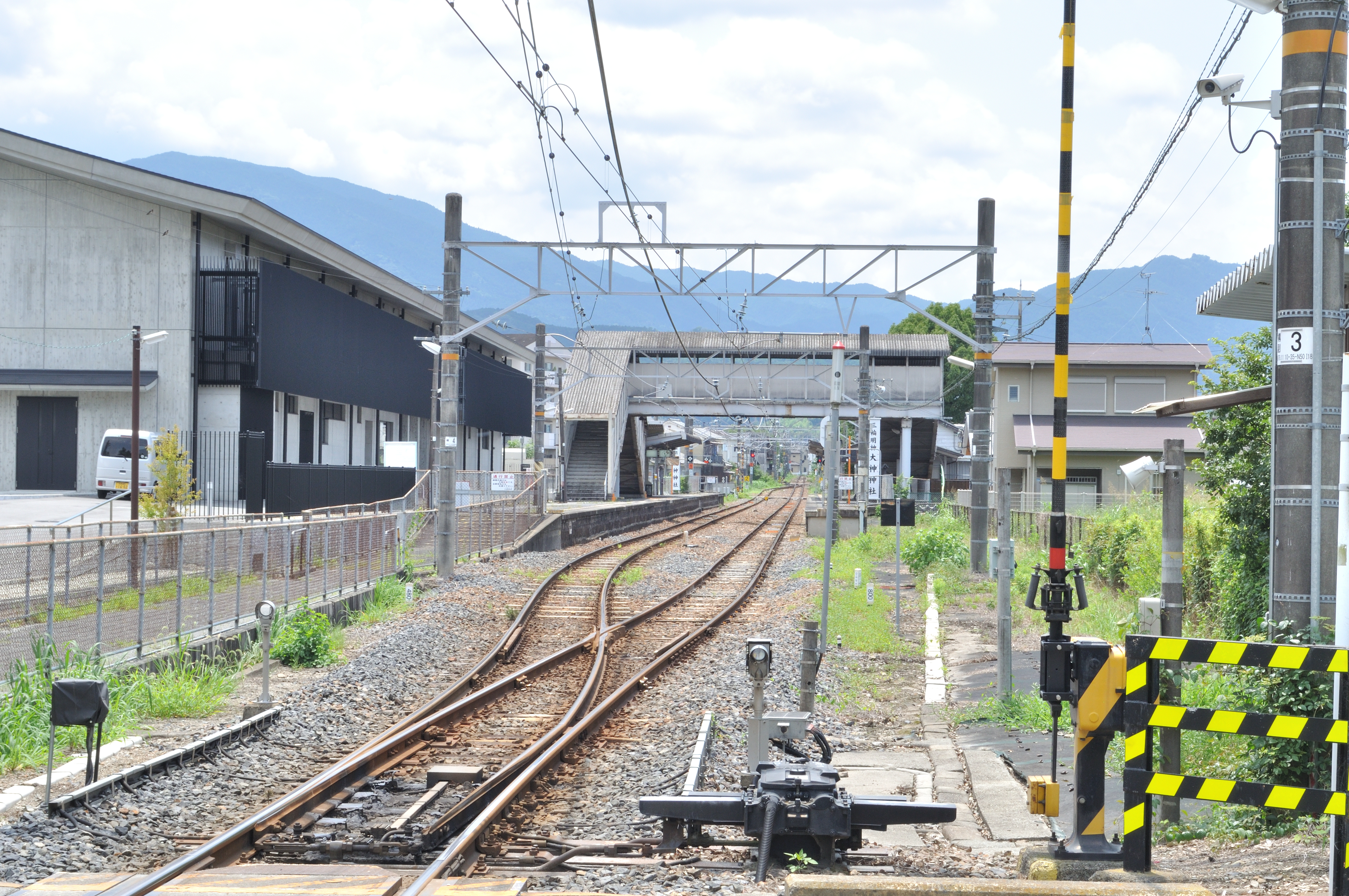
Overpass

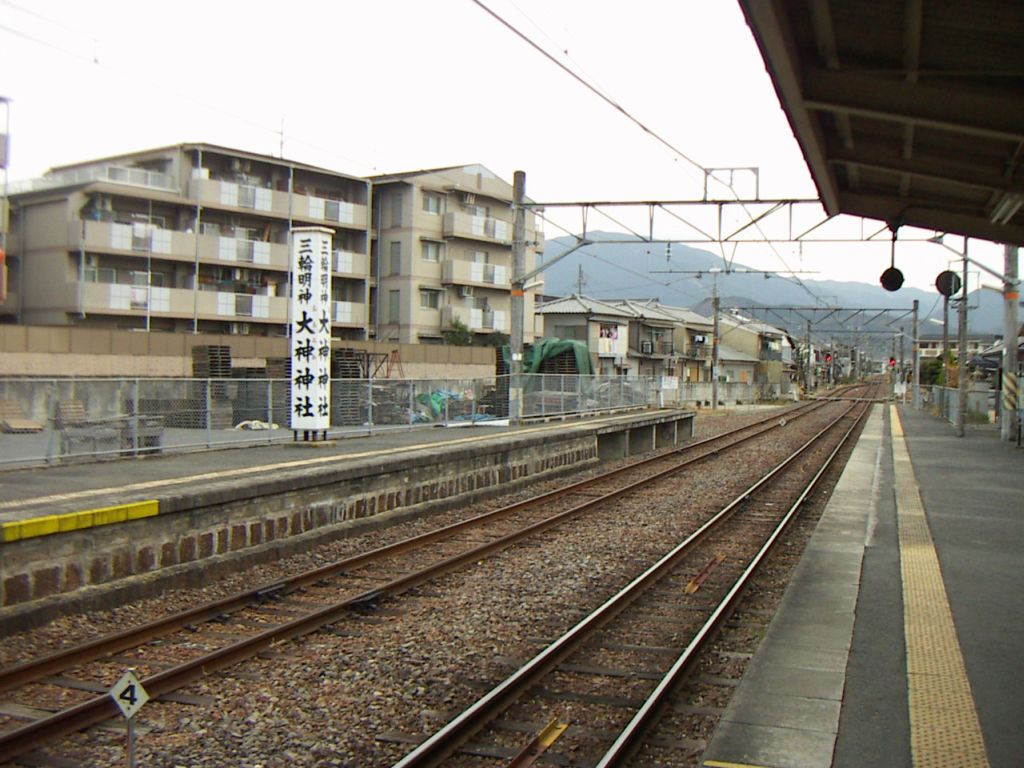
Platforms

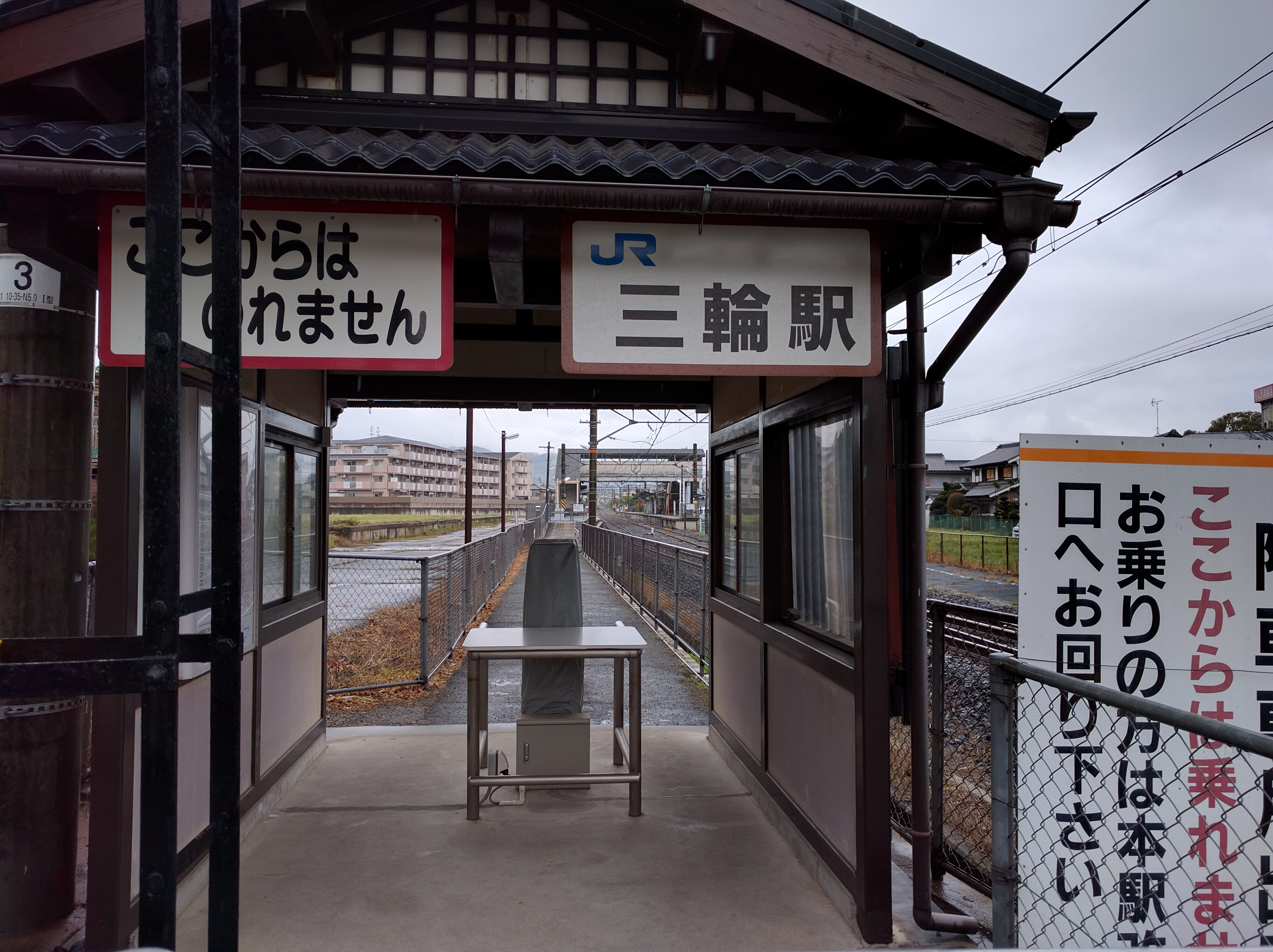
Temporary exit gate

== History ==
Miwa Station opened on 11 May 1898 as a station on the Nara Railway. The Nara Railway was acquired by the Kansai Railway in 1905, which was subsequently nationalized in 1907. With the privatization of the Japan National Railways (JNR) on April 1, 1987, the station came under the control of West Japan Railway Company (JR West).

== Passenger statistics ==
The average daily passenger traffic in fiscal 2020 was 715 passengers.

== Surrounding area ==
- Ōmiwa jinja

== See also ==
- List of railway stations in Japan
