= Yanagimoto Station =

Railway station in Tenri, Nara Prefecture, Japan

Yanagimoto Station 柳本駅
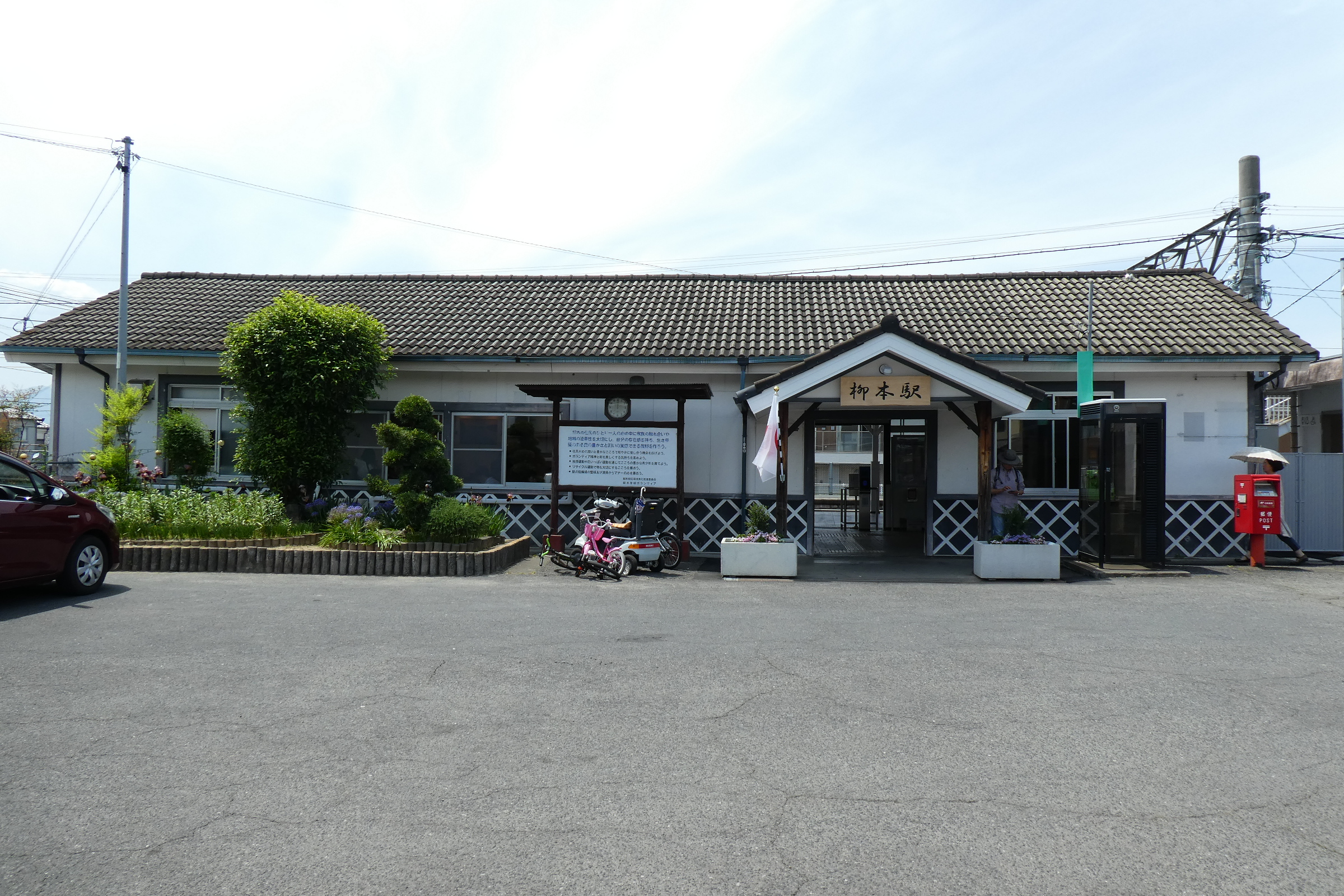
- Yanagimoto Station in 2019

General information
- Location: 1306 Yanagimotochō, Tenri-shi, Nara-ken 632-0052; Japan
- Coordinates: 34°33′33″N 135°50′19″E
- System: JR-West commuter rail station
- Owner: West Japan Railway Company (JR-West)
- Operator: Unstaffed
- Lines: Passenger train services: U Man-yō Mahoroba Line; Railway track: Sakurai Line
- Distance: 14.3 km (8.9 miles) from Nara
- Platforms: 2 side platforms
- Tracks: 2
- Train operators: JR-West
- Connections: None

Construction
- Structure type: At grade
- Parking: None
- Cycle facilities: Available
- Accessible: None

Other information
- Website: http://www.jr-odekake.net/eki/top.php?id=0621706

History
- Opened: 11 May 1898

Passengers
- 2020: 466 daily
Services
Preceding station	JRW	Following station
U Man-yō Mahoroba Line
Nagara toward Nara	Local	Makimuku toward Wakayama, Ōji, Takada, and Sakurai
Nagara; One-way	Rapid Service	Makimuku toward JR Namba
Location
- Location within Nara Prefecture Location within Kansai region Location within Japan

Yanagimoto Station (柳本駅, Yanagimoto-eki) is a passenger railway station located in the city of Tenri, Nara, Japan. It is operated by West Japan Railway Company (JR West).

== Lines ==
Although the station is on the Sakurai Line as rail infrastructure, it has been served by the Man-yō Mahoroba Line since 2010 in terms of passenger train services. It is 14.3 kilometers from the starting point of the line at Nara.

== Layout ==
Yanagimoto Station is an above-ground station with two opposed side platforms with two tracks, connected by a footbridge. The station is staffed.

=== Platforms ===
1	■ U Man-yō Mahoroba Line	for Nara
2	■ U Man-yō Mahoroba Line	for Wakayama, Ōji, Takada, Sakurai for JR Namba

== History ==
Yanagimoto Station was opened on 11 May 1898 as a station on the Nara Railway. The line was transferrer to the Kansai Railway on 7 February 1905, which was subsequently nationalized on 1 October 1907. The current station building was completed in 1930. With the privatization of the Japan National Railways (JNR) on 1 April 1987, the station was transferred to JR West. The station building was transferred to the city of Tenri in 2019, and was remodeled to include a cafe and retail spaces.

== Passenger statistics ==
The average daily passenger traffic in fiscal 2020 was 466 passengers.。

== Surrounding area ==
- Kurozuka Kofun
- Chōgaku-ji

== See also ==
- List of railway stations in Japan
