= Kanahashi Station =

Railway station in Kashihara, Nara Prefecture, Japan

Kanahashi Station 金橋駅
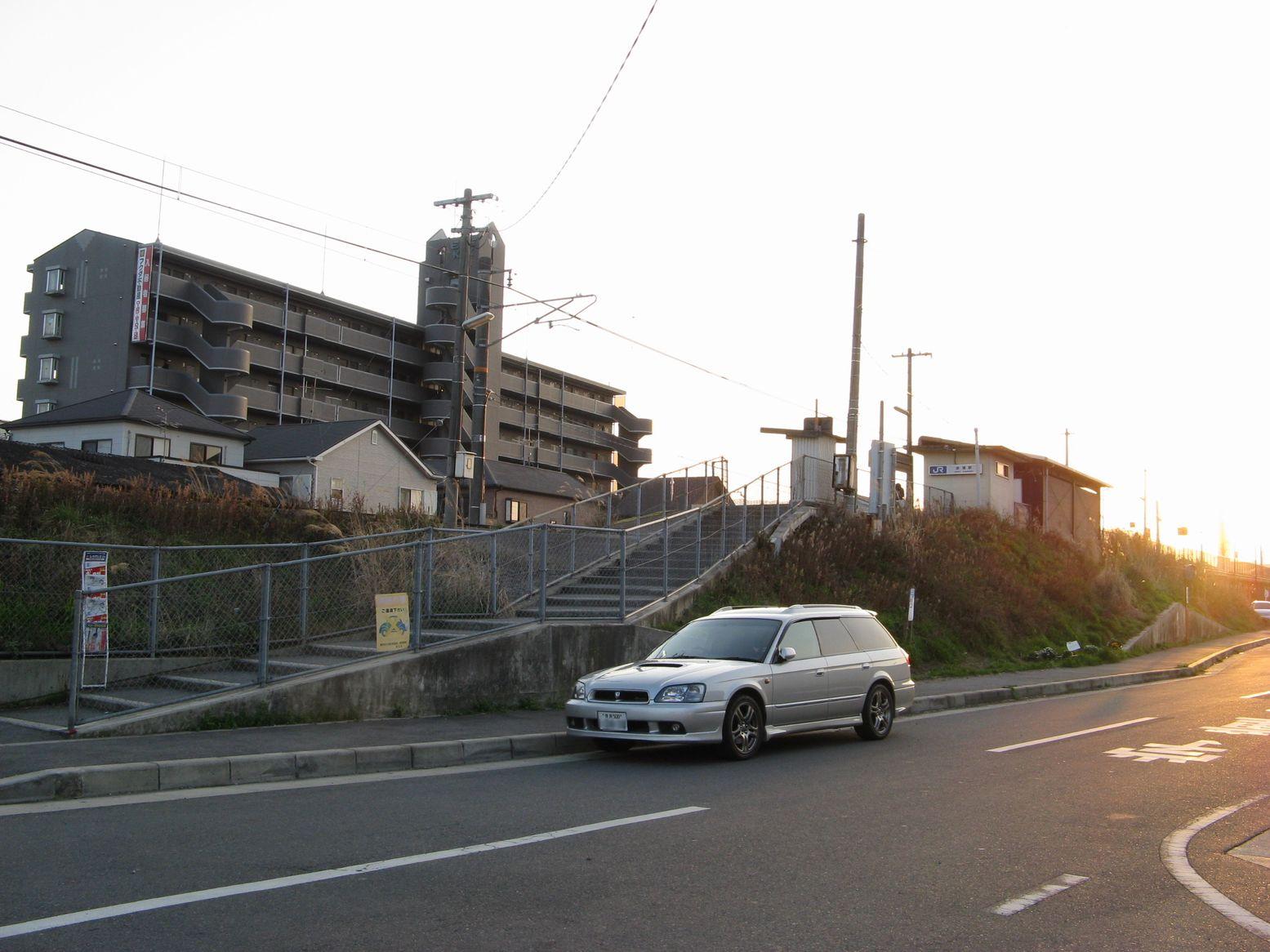
- Kanahashi Station

General information
- Location: 7-1, Magarikawa-chō 5-chōme, Kashihara-shi, Nara-ken 634-0837; Japan
- Coordinates: 34°30′35″N 135°45′55″E
- System: JR-West commuter rail station
- Owner: West Japan Railway Company (JR-West)
- Lines: Passenger train services: U Man-yō Mahoroba Line; Railway track: Sakurai Line
- Distance: 27.3 km (17.0 miles) from Nara via Sakurai
- Platforms: 1 side platform
- Tracks: 1
- Train operators: JR-West
- Connections: Nara Kotsu Bus Lines 40・161・Tokkyu (Limited Express) at Kokudō-Magarikawa

Construction
- Structure type: At grade
- Parking: None
- Cycle facilities: Available
- Accessible: None

Other information
- Website: http://www.jr-odekake.net/eki/top.php?id=0621712

History
- Opened: 21 April 1913

Passengers
- FY 2022: 577 daily
Services
| Preceding station | JRW | Following station |
U Man-yō Mahoroba Line
| Takada toward Wakayama and Ōji | Local | Unebi toward Nara |
| Takada; Terminus | Local | Unebi toward Nara |
| Takada toward JR Namba | Rapid Service | Unebi; One-way |
Location
- Location within Nara Prefecture Location within Japan

Kanahashi Station (金橋駅, Kanahashi-eki) is a passenger railway station located in the city of Kashihara, Nara, Japan. It is operated by West Japan Railway Company (JR West).

== Lines ==
Although the station is on the Sakurai Line as rail infrastructure, it has been served by the Man-yō Mahoroba Line since 2010 in terms of passenger train services. It is 27.3 kilometers from the starting point of the line at Nara.

== Layout ==
Kanahashi Station is an above-ground station with one side platform serving a single bi-directional track. There is a station building on the right side when facing towards Takada. The station is unattended.

== History ==
Kanahashi Station opened on 21 April 1913. With the privatization of the Japan National Railways (JNR) on April 1, 1987, the station came under the control of West Japan Railway Company (JR West).

== Passenger statistics ==
The average daily passenger traffic in fiscal 2022 was 577 passengers.

== Surrounding area ==
- Japan National Route 24

== See also ==
- List of railway stations in Japan
