= Kyōbate Station =

Railway station in Nara, Nara Prefecture, Japan

Kyōbate Station 京終駅
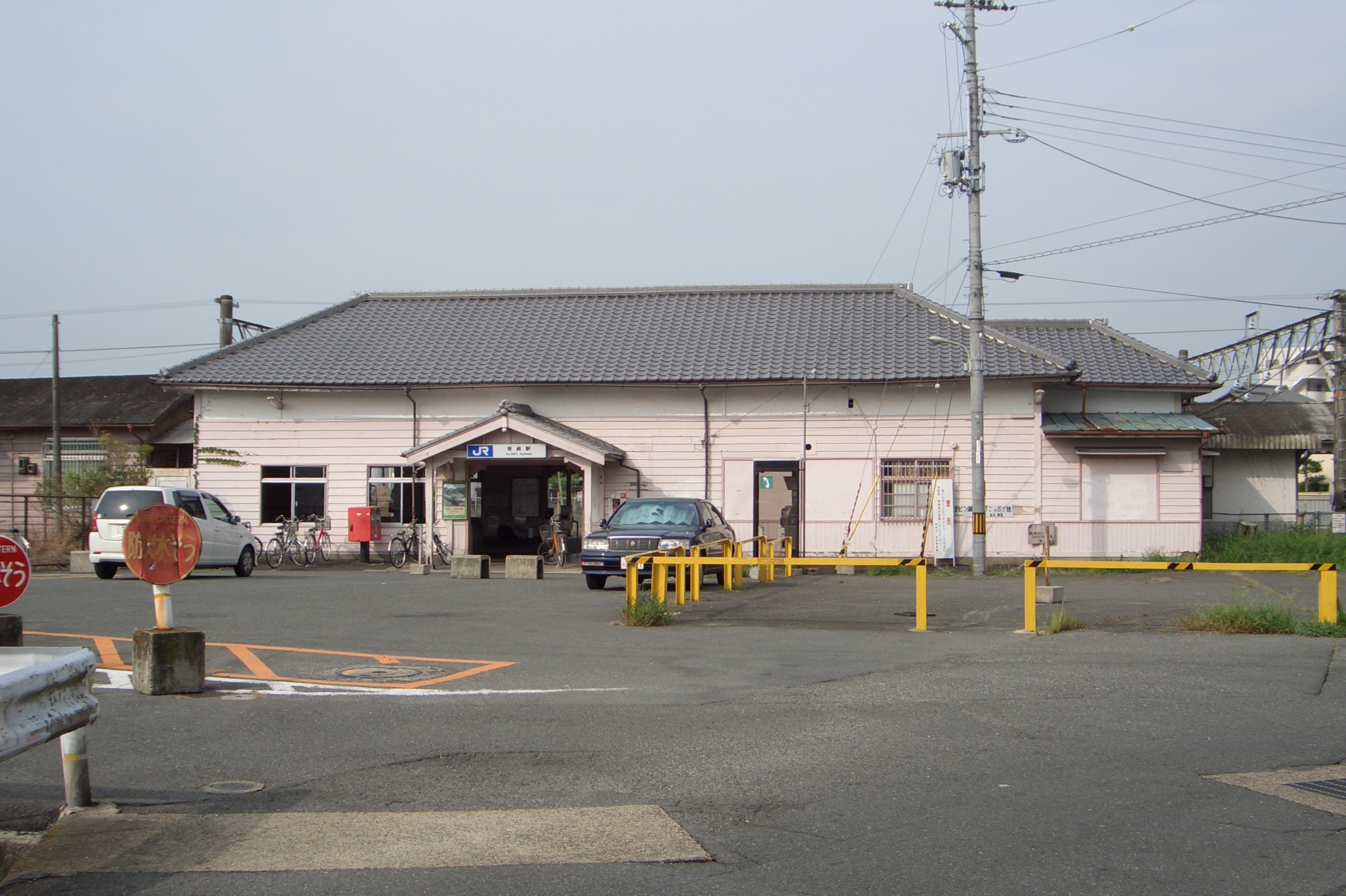
- Kyōbate Station—August 2008

General information
- Location: 211 Minamikyōbatechō, Nara City; Nara Prefecture; Japan
- Coordinates: 34°40′11″N 135°49′44″E
- Operator: Logo of the West Railway Company (JR West)
- Line: U Man-yō Mahoroba Line (Sakurai Line)
- Distance: 1.9 km (1.2 miles) from Nara
- Platforms: 2 side platforms
- Tracks: 2
- Connections: None

Construction
- Structure type: At grade
- Parking: None
- Cycle facilities: Available
- Accessible: None

Other information
- Website: Official website

History
- Opened: 11 May 1898; 128 years ago

Passengers
- 2019: 740 daily (boarding only)

Services
| Preceding station | JR West | Following station |
|---|---|---|
| Obitoke towards Takada | Man-yō Mahoroba Line (Sakurai Line) Local | Nara Terminus |
| Obitoke towards Takada | Man-yō Mahoroba Line (Sakurai Line) Rapid | Nara One-way operation |
Location
- Location within Nara Prefecture Location within Kansai region Location within Japan

Kyōbate Station (京終駅, Kyōbate-eki) is a train station of West Japan Railway Company (JR-West) in the city of Nara, Japan. Although the station is on the Sakurai Line as rail infrastructure, it has been served by the Man-yō Mahoroba Line since 2010 in terms of passenger train services.

In 2026, the Kyōbate Station was one of the JR West stations where special measures were implemented to prevent station visitors from becoming victims of fraud.

== Lines ==
- JR West
  - U Man-yō Mahoroba Line (Sakurai Line)

== Layout ==
=== Platforms ===
| 1 | ■ Man-yō Mahoroba Line—Local | for Nara |
| 2 | ■ Man-yō Mahoroba Line—Local | for Wakayama, Ōji, Takada, and Sakurai |
| 2 | ■ Man-yō Mahoroba Line—Rapid Service | for JR Namba |
