= Namba Station (disambiguation) =

Namba Station is a name shared by two railway stations in the Namba district of Chūō-ku, Osaka, Japan.

Namba Station (難波駅) may also refer to:

- JR Namba Station, a railway station in Namba, Naniwa Ward, Osaka, Japan
- Ōsaka Namba Station, a railway station on the Kintetsu Namba Line and Hanshin Namba Line in the Namba district of Chūō-ku, Osaka, Japan
