= Sakurai Line =

Railway line in Nara prefecture, Japan

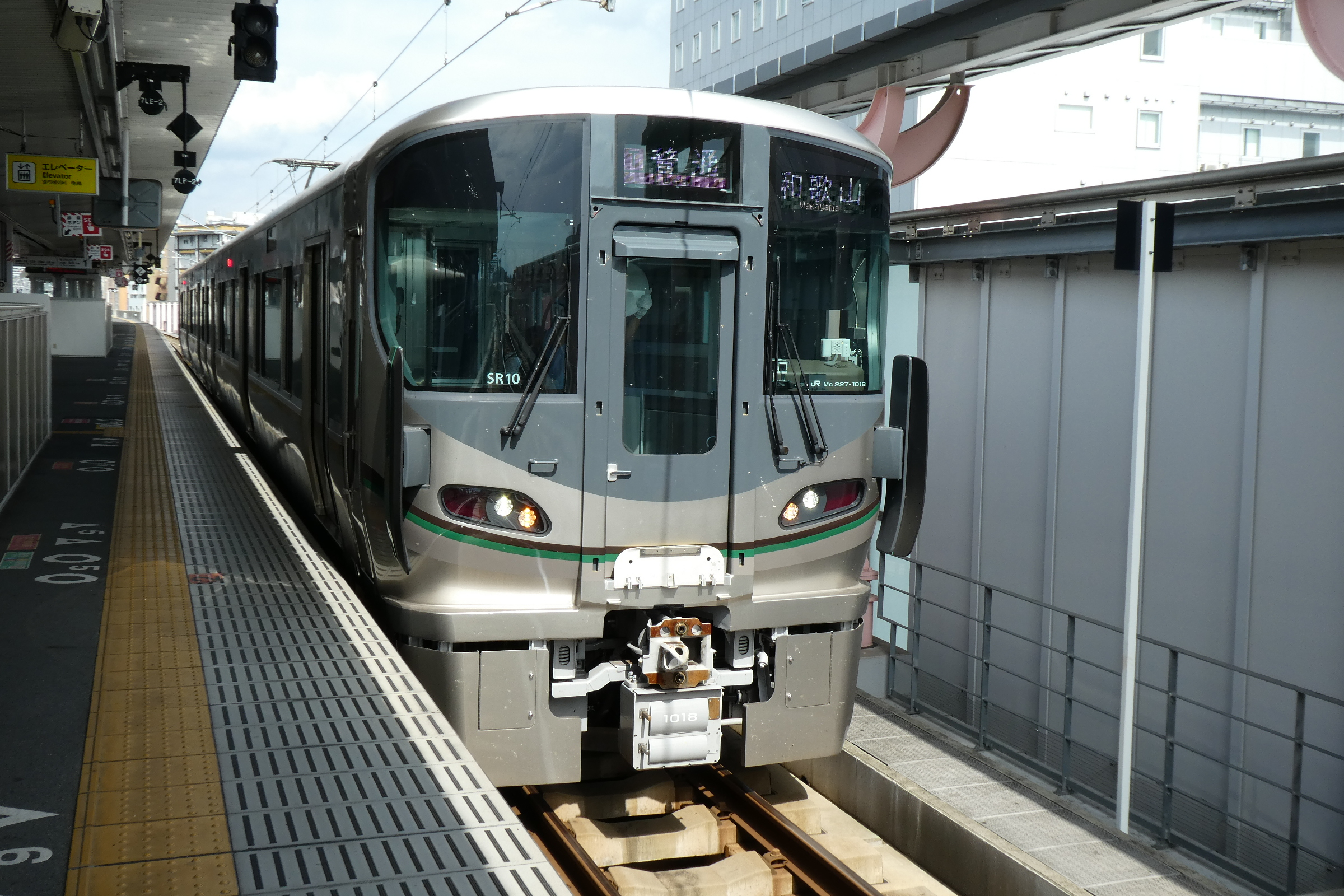
- 227-1000 series at Nara Station

Overview
- Other name: Man-yō Mahoroba Line
- Owner: JR West
- Locale: Nara Prefecture
- Termini: Nara; Takada
- Stations: 14

Service
- Type: Regional rail
- System: Urban Network
- Rolling stock: 103 series EMU, 201 series EMU, 221 series EMU, 227-1000 series EMU

History
- Opened: 1893; 133 years ago

Technical
- Line length: 29.4 km (18.3 mi)
- Track gauge: 1,067 mm (3 ft 6 in)
- Electrification: 1,500 V DC, overhead lines
- Operating speed: 85 km/h (53 mph)

The Sakurai Line (桜井線, Sakurai-sen), also referred to with the official nickname Man-yō Mahoroba Line (万葉まほろば線, Man'yō Mahoroba-sen), is a railway line operated by West Japan Railway Company (JR West) in Nara Prefecture. It connects Nara on the Yamatoji Line to Takada on the Wakayama Line, with some services continuing on the Wakayama Line to Ōji Station, and then to JR Namba on the Yamatoji Line. Since March 13, 2010, the line has also been called the "Man-yō Mahoroba Line", a name that references the large number of ancient landmarks along the line's route. "Man-yō" refers to the Man'yōshū and mahoroba refers to Nara.

== History ==
The Osaka Railway Co. opened the Takada - Sakurai section in 1893, and the Nara Railway Co. opened the Sakurai - Kyobate section in 1898, extending the line to Nara the following year.

In 1900 the Osaka Railway Co. merged with the Kansai Railway Co., and the Nara Railway Co. did likewise in 1905. In 1907 the Kansai Railway Co. was nationalised.

CTC signalling was commissioned in 1979, and the line was electrified in 1980. Freight services ceased in 1983.

=== Former connecting lines ===
- Sakurai station -

The Osaka Electric Railway Co. operated a 6km line to Hatsuse between 1909 and 1938.

The Yamoto Railway Co. line from Oji connected between 1923 and 1944, when that line closed beyond Tawaramoto station.

- Unebi station - The Kintetsu Railway Osa line connected here between 1924 and 1945.

== Stations ==
Station	Japanese	distance (km)	Transfers	Location	
Nara	奈良	0.0	Q Yamatoji Line (Q36); D Nara Line (D21)	Nara	Nara Prefecture
Kyōbate	京終	1.9		Nara	Nara Prefecture
Obitoke	帯解	4.8		Nara	Nara Prefecture
Ichinomoto	櫟本	7.3		Tenri	Nara Prefecture
Tenri	天理	9.6	H Kintetsu Tenri Line (H35)	Tenri	Nara Prefecture
Nagara	長柄	12.6		Tenri	Nara Prefecture
Yanagimoto	柳本	14.3		Tenri	Nara Prefecture
Makimuku	巻向	15.9		Sakurai	Nara Prefecture
Miwa	三輪	18.0		Sakurai	Nara Prefecture
Sakurai	桜井	19.7	D Kintetsu Osaka Line (D42)	Sakurai	Nara Prefecture
Kaguyama	香久山	21.7		Kashihara	Nara Prefecture
Unebi	畝傍	24.7	Kintetsu Kashihara Line (Yagi-nishiguchi Station)	Kashihara	Nara Prefecture
Kanahashi	金橋	27.3		Kashihara	Nara Prefecture
Takada	高田	29.4	T Wakayama Line; D Kintetsu Osaka Line (D25:Yamato-Takada Station)	Yamatotakada	Nara Prefecture
Through service on the Wakayama Line to Ōji and Gojō

== Rolling stock ==
- 103 series
- 221 series
- 227-1000 series (from Spring 2019)

=== Former ===
- 105 series (until 2020)
- 113 series
- 201 series (until 2023)

== See also ==
- List of railway lines in Japan
