= Yanagimoto =

Yanagimoto (written: 柳本) is a Japanese surname. Notable people with the surname include:

- Hiroshige Yanagimoto (柳本 啓成, born 1972), Japanese footballer
- Ryusaku Yanagimoto (柳本 柳作, 1894–1942), Imperial Japanese Navy admiral
- Shoichi Yanagimoto (柳本 晶一, born 1951), Japanese volleyball player
- Takuji Yanagimoto (柳本 卓治, born 1944), Japanese politician

== See also ==
- Yanagimoto Domain, a Japanese domain of the Edo period
- Yanagimoto Station, a railway station in Tenri, Nara Prefecture, Japan
