= Daifuku Station =

Railway station in Sakurai, Nara prefecture, Japan

Daifuku Station 大福駅
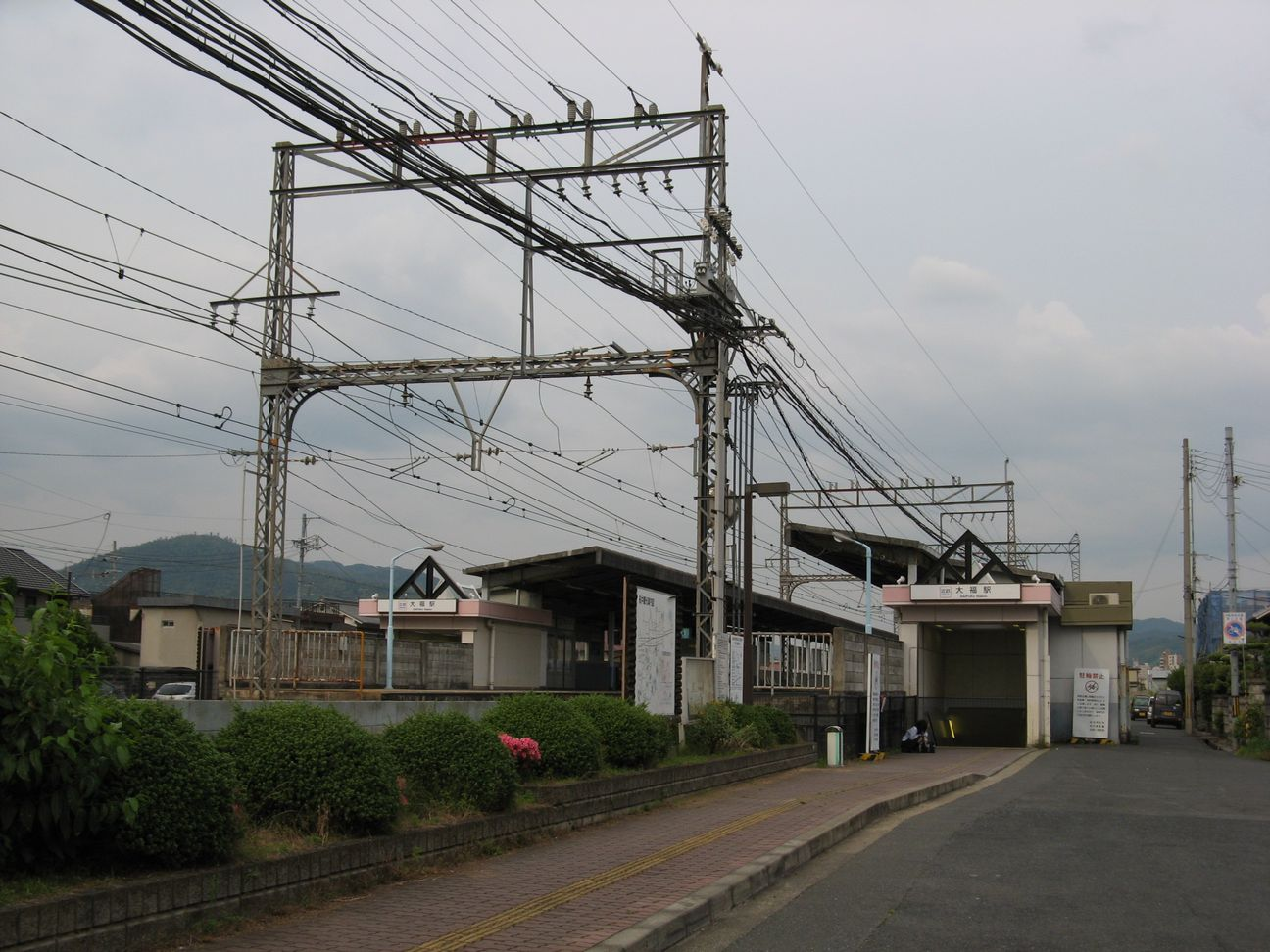
- Daifuku Station, June 2007

General information
- Location: Daifuku, Sakurai-shi, Nara-ken 633-0067; Japan
- Coordinates: 34.5129°N 135.8298°E
- System: Kintetsu Railway commuter rail station
- Owner: Kintetsu Railway
- Operator: Kintetsu Railway
- Line: D Osaka Line
- Distance: 38.2 km (23.7 miles) from Ōsaka Uehommachi
- Platforms: 2 side platforms
- Tracks: 2
- Train operators: Kintetsu Railway

Construction
- Structure type: At grade

Other information
- Station code: D41
- Website: Official website

History
- Opened: 5 January 1929

Passengers
- 2019: 797 daily

Services
Preceding station	Kintetsu Railway	Following station
Terminus	Osaka Line Local Semi-Express left=Miminashi	Sakurai towards Ise-Nakagawa
Location
- Location within Nara Prefecture Location within Japan

Daifuku Station (大福駅, Daifuku-eki) is a passenger railway station located in the city of Sakurai, Nara Prefecture, Japan. It is operated by the private transportation company, Kintetsu Railway.

== Line ==
Daifuku Station is served by the Osaka Line and is 38.2 kilometers from the starting point of the line at Ōsaka Uehommachi.

== Layout ==
The station is an above-ground station with two side platforms and two tracks. The ticket gates and concourse are underground, and the platforms are above ground. The effective length of the platform is six cars. There is only one ticket gate. There is one entrance to the ground on each side. The station is unattended.

=== Platforms ===
1	■ Osaka Line	for Haibara and Nabari
2	■ Osaka Line	for Yamato-Yagi and Osaka Uehommachi

== History ==
Daifuku Station opened on 5 January 1929 on the Osaka Electric Tramway Sakurai Line opened between Daiki Yagi and Sakurai. On 15 March 1941, the line merged with the Sangu Express Railway and became the Kansai Express Railway's Osaka Line. This line was merged with the Nankai Electric Railway on 1 June 1944 to form Kintetsu. On 26 December 1990 the station was converted to an underground station.

== Passenger statistics ==
In fiscal 2019, the station was used by an average of 797 passengers daily (boarding passengers only).

== Surrounding area ==
The west and south sides of the station are residential areas. The east and north sides of the station are fields, but there are houses and apartments near the station.

== See also ==
- List of railway stations in Japan
