= Aoyamachō Station =

Railway station in Iga, Mie Prefecture, Japan

Aoyamachō Station 青山町駅
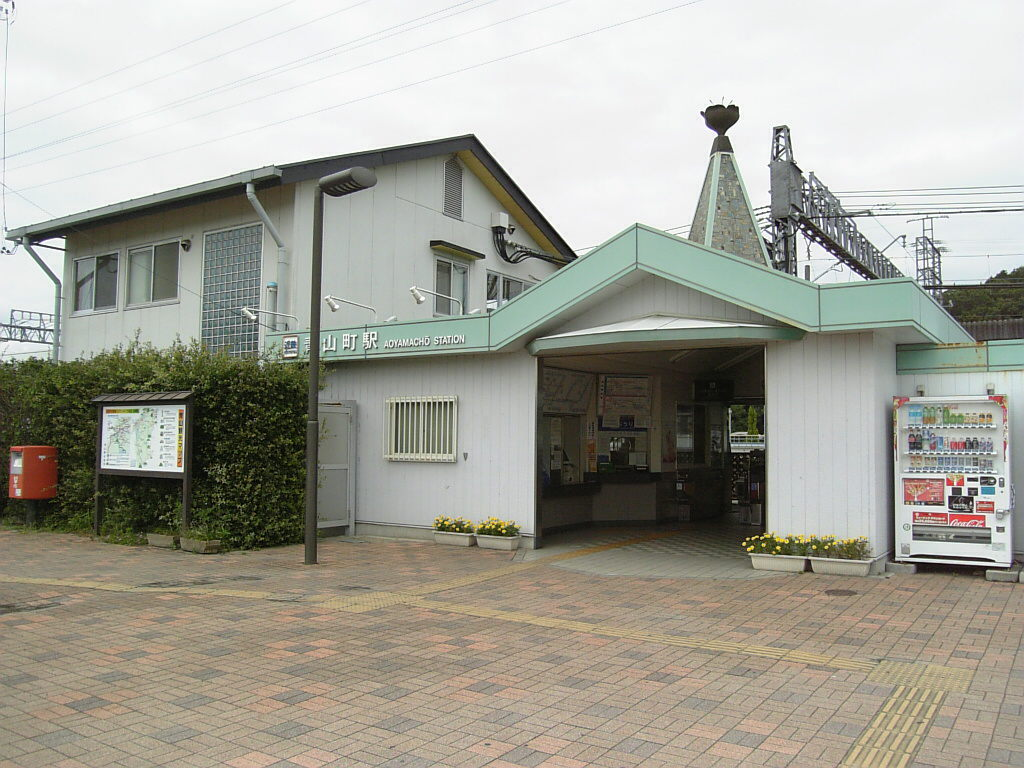
- Aoyamachō Station in August 2007

General information
- Location: 405 Ao, Iga-shi, Mie-ken 518-0226; Japan
- Coordinates: 34°40′22″N 136°10′40″E
- Operator: Kintetsu Railway
- Line: Osaka Line
- Distance: 77.9 km from Ōsaka Uehommachi
- Platforms: 2 island platforms

Other information
- Station code: D53
- Website: Official website

History
- Opened: November 19, 1930
- Former names: Ao (until 1970)

Passengers
- FY2019: 940 daily

Services
Preceding station	Kintetsu Railway	Following station
Iga-Kambe towards Osaka Uehommachi	Osaka Line Local Express	Iga-Kōzu towards Ise-Nakagawa
Iga-Kambe towards Osaka Uehommachi	Osaka Line Rapid Express	Sakakibara-Onsenguchi towards Ise-Nakagawa
Location
- Location within Mie Prefecture Location within Japan

Aoyamachō Station (青山町駅, Aoyamachō-eki) is a passenger railway station in located in the city of Iga, Mie Prefecture, Japan, operated by the private railway operator Kintetsu Railway.

== Lines ==
Aoyamachō Station is served by the Osaka Line, and is located 77.9 rail kilometers from the starting point of the line at Ōsaka Uehommachi Station.

== Station layout ==
The station consists of two island platforms, connected by an underground passage.

=== Platforms ===
1, 2	■ Osaka Line	for Ise-Nakagawa , Ujiyamada , Kashikojima and Nagoya
3, 4	■ Osaka Line	for Nabari, Yamato-Yagi and Osaka Uehommachi

== History ==
Aoyamachō Station opened on November 19, 1930, as Ao Station (阿保駅, Ao-eki) on the Sangu Express Electric Railway. After merging with Osaka Electric Kido on March 15, 1941, the line became the Kansai Express Railway's Osaka Line. This line was merged with the Nankai Electric Railway on June 1, 1944, to form Kintetsu. The station was renamed to its present name on March 1, 1970.

== Passenger statistics ==
In fiscal 2019, the station was used by an average of 940 passengers daily (boarding passengers only).

== Surrounding area ==
- Sakuragaoka Junior & Senior High School

== See also ==
- List of railway stations in Japan
