= Sakurai Station (Nara) =

Railway station in Sakurai, Nara Prefecture, Japan

Sakurai Station 桜井駅
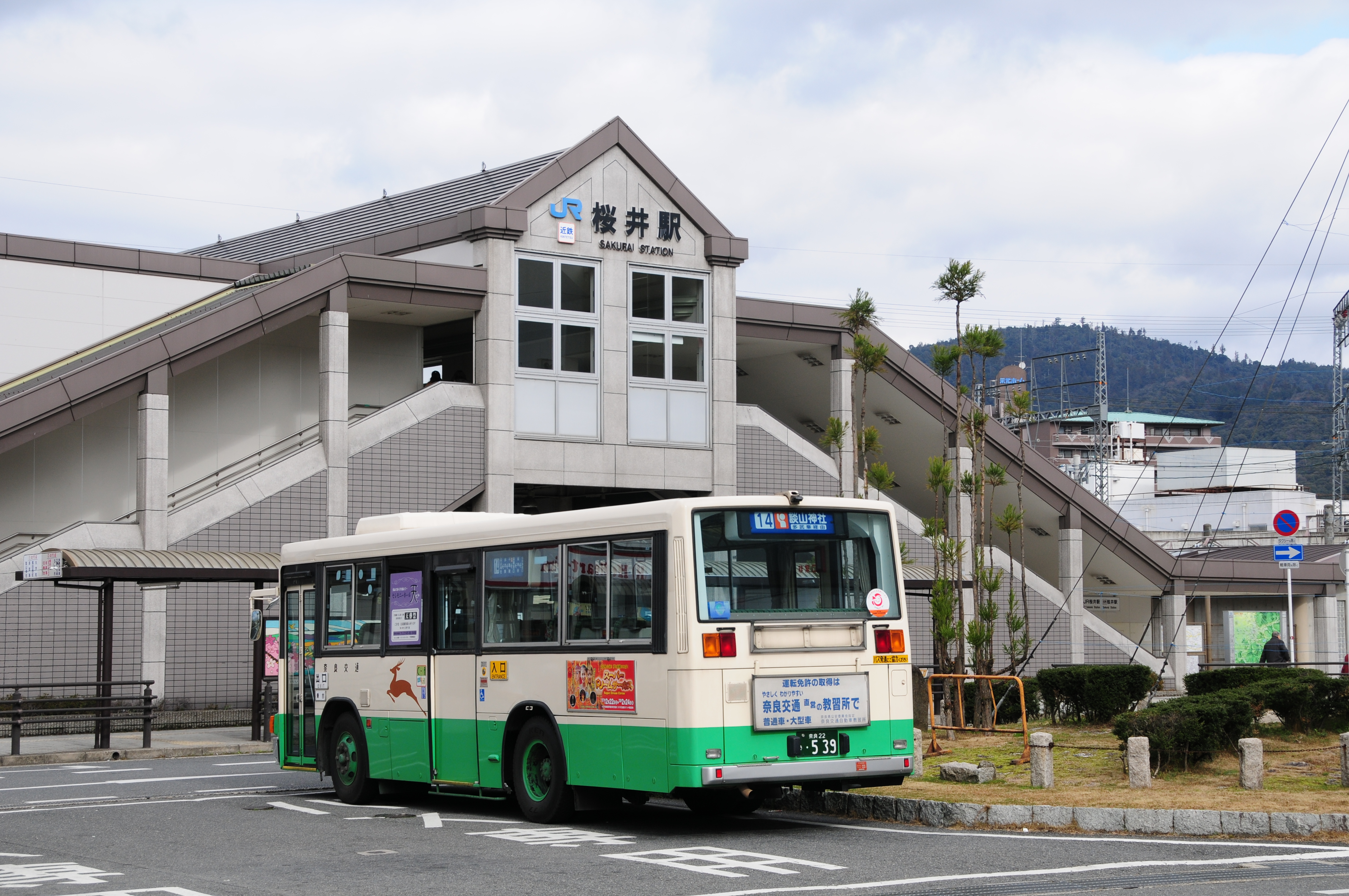
- The south entrance of Sakurai Station in January 2008

General information
- Location: JR-West: 191-1, Sakurai, Sakurai-shi, Nara-ken （奈良県桜井市桜井191-1番地）; Kintetsu: 190-2, Sakurai, Sakurai-shi, Nara-ken （奈良県桜井市桜井190-2）; Japan
- Coordinates: 34°30′47″N 135°50′48″E
- System: commuter rail station
- Owner: West Japan Railway Company (JR-West); Kintetsu Railway
- Operator: JR West Koutsu Service; Kintetsu Railway
- Lines: U Man-yō Mahoroba Line; D Osaka Line
- Distance: JR-West: 19.7 km (12.2 miles) from Nara; Kintetsu Railway: 39.8 km (24.7 miles) from Ōsaka-Uehonmachi
- Platforms: JR-West: 1 side platform and 1 island platform; Kintetsu Railway: 2 side platforms
- Tracks: JR-West: 3; Kintetsu Railway: 2
- Train operators: JR-West; Kintetsu Railway
- Bus stands: 4
- Connections: Kanto Bus / Nara Kotsu Bus Lines: Yamato-gō Shinjuku—Gojō Route at Sakurai-eki (North Exit); Kansai Airport Transportation Enterprise / Nara Kotsu Bus Lines: Airport Limousine Kansai Airport—Yamato-Yagi / Takada Route at Sakurai-eki (North Exit); Nara Kotsu Bus Lines: 60, 62, and 63 at Sakurai-eki (North Exit); 37 and 71 at Sakurai-eki (South Exit); Sakurai City Community Bus: Hase / Asakuradai Route, Northwestern Circular Route, North Circular Route at Sakurai-eki (North Exit); South Circular Route, Tōnomine Route at Sakurai-eki (South Exit)

Construction
- Structure type: JR-West: At grade; Kintetsu Railway: Elevated
- Parking: Available
- Cycle facilities: Available
- Accessible: JR-West: Yes (1 elevator and 1 escalator for the ticket gate, 1 elevator for each platform, and 1 accessible bathroom); Kintetsu Railway: Yes (1 elevator and 1 escalator for each platform, 1 accessible bathroom, and equipped wheelchairs)

Other information
- Station code: D42
- Website: JR West website Kintetsu website

History
- Opened: JR-West: 23 May 1893; Kintetsu Railway: 5 January 1929
- Rebuilt: 1995
- Electrified: JR-West: 1980

Passengers
- 2016: JR-West: 2,043 daily; Kintetsu Railway: 17,738 daily
Services
Preceding station	JRW	Following station
U Man-yō Mahoroba Line
Kaguyama toward Wakayama, Ōji, and Takada		Miwa toward Nara
Kaguyama toward JR Namba	Rapid Service	Miwa; One-way
Preceding station	Kintetsu Railway	Following station
	D Osaka Line	
Daifuku toward Osaka Uehommachi, Takayasu, and Yamato-Yagi	Local	Yamato-Asakura toward Nabari and Haibara
Daifuku toward Osaka Uehommachi	Suburban Semi-Express	Yamato-Asakura toward Nabari and Haibara
Daifuku toward Osaka Uehommachi	Semi-Express	Yamato-Asakura toward Nabari and Haibara
Yamato-Yagi toward Osaka Uehommachi	Express	Yamato-Asakura toward Isuzugawa, Ujiyamada, Aoyamachō, and Nabari
Yamato-Yagi toward Osaka Uehommachi	Rapid Express	Haibara toward Isuzugawa, Matsusaka, and Aoyamachō
Location
- Location within Nara Prefecture Location within Japan

Sakurai Station (桜井駅, Sakurai-eki) is a passenger railway station located in the city of Sakurai, Nara Prefecture, Japan. Although the station is on the Sakurai Line as rail infrastructure, it has been served by the Man-yō Mahoroba Line since 2010 in terms of passenger train services. Sakurai Station is also served by the Osaka Line of the Kintetsu Railway.

Contactless smart cards including ICOCA (JR-West) and PiTaPa (Surutto KANSAI) are available on both rail systems.

== Lines ==
- JR-West
  - U Man-yō Mahoroba Line
- Kintetsu Railway
  - D Osaka Line

== Layout ==
The elevated Kintetsu Osaka Line and the ground JR-West Sakurai Line are connected by a footbridge.

=== JR-West platforms ===
The JR-West station has one side platform and one island platform serving three tracks. The station has a Midori on Madoguchi staffed ticket office.

1	■ Man-yō Mahoroba Line	for Ōji, and Takada

2	■ Man-yō Mahoroba Line	for Nara

3	■ Man-yō Mahoroba Line	for Nara

=== Kintetsu Railway platforms ===
The Kintetsu station has two side platforms serving one track each.

1	■ Osaka Line	for Haibara and Nabari
2	■ Osaka Line	for Osaka Uehommachi

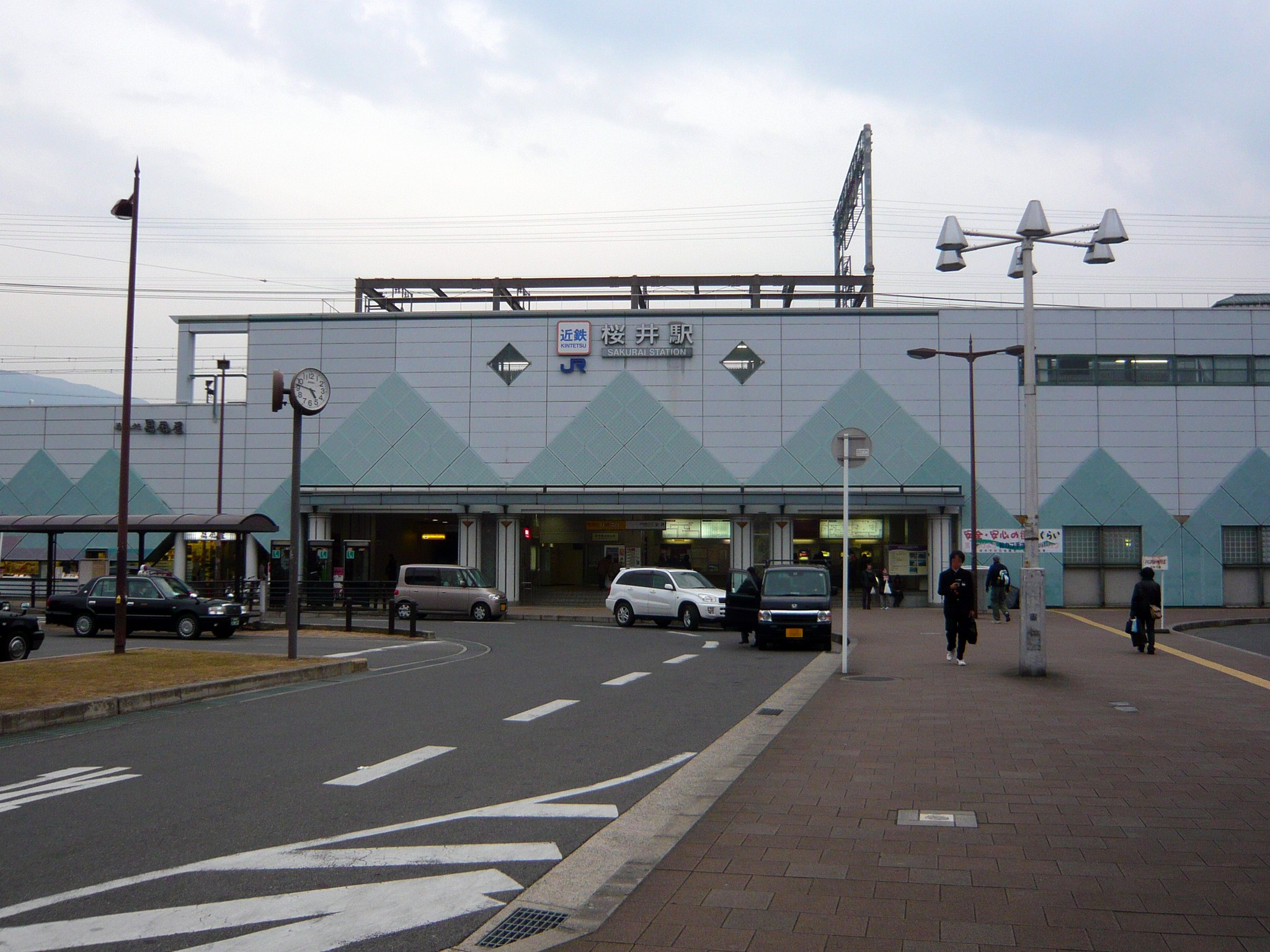
Sakurai Station north entrance in February 2011

== History ==
Sakurai Station opened on 23 May 1893 as the terminus of the Osaka Railway from Takada Station. The Nara Railway connected to the station on 11 May 1898. In 1900 the Osaka Railway was acquired by the Kansai Railway, and the Nara Railway was likewise acquired by the Kansai Railway in 1905. The Kansai Railway was nationalized in 1907. On 11 December 1909, the Hatsuse Tramway opens between Sakurai Station and Hatsuse Station; this line was renamed the Hatsuse Railway in 1912 and the Hase Railway in 1915. On 8 January 1928, the Hase Railway was acquired by the Osaka Electric Tramway, which merged with the Sangu Express Railway in 1941 to become the Kansai Express Railway. In 1944, the Kansai Express Railway became part of the Kintetsu Railway. With the privatisation of the JNR on 1 April 1987, the what is now the JR portion of the station became parts of the West Japan Railway Company (JR West). A new station building was completed on 10 March 1995, at which the exit gates for the JR and Kintetsu portions of the station were separated. With the privatization of the Japan National Railways (JNR) on April 1, 1987, the station came under the control of West Japan Railway Company (JR West).

== Passenger statistics ==
The average daily passenger traffic for the JR portion of the station in fiscal 2020 was 1995 passengers. During discal 2019, the Kintetsu portion of the station was used by 8,435 passengers daily.

== Surrounding area ==
- Sakurai City Hall
- Nara Prefectural Sakurai High School
- Nara Prefectural Commercial High School

== See also ==
- List of railway stations in Japan
