= Nara Station =

Railway station in Nara, Nara Prefecture, Japan

Nara Station 奈良駅
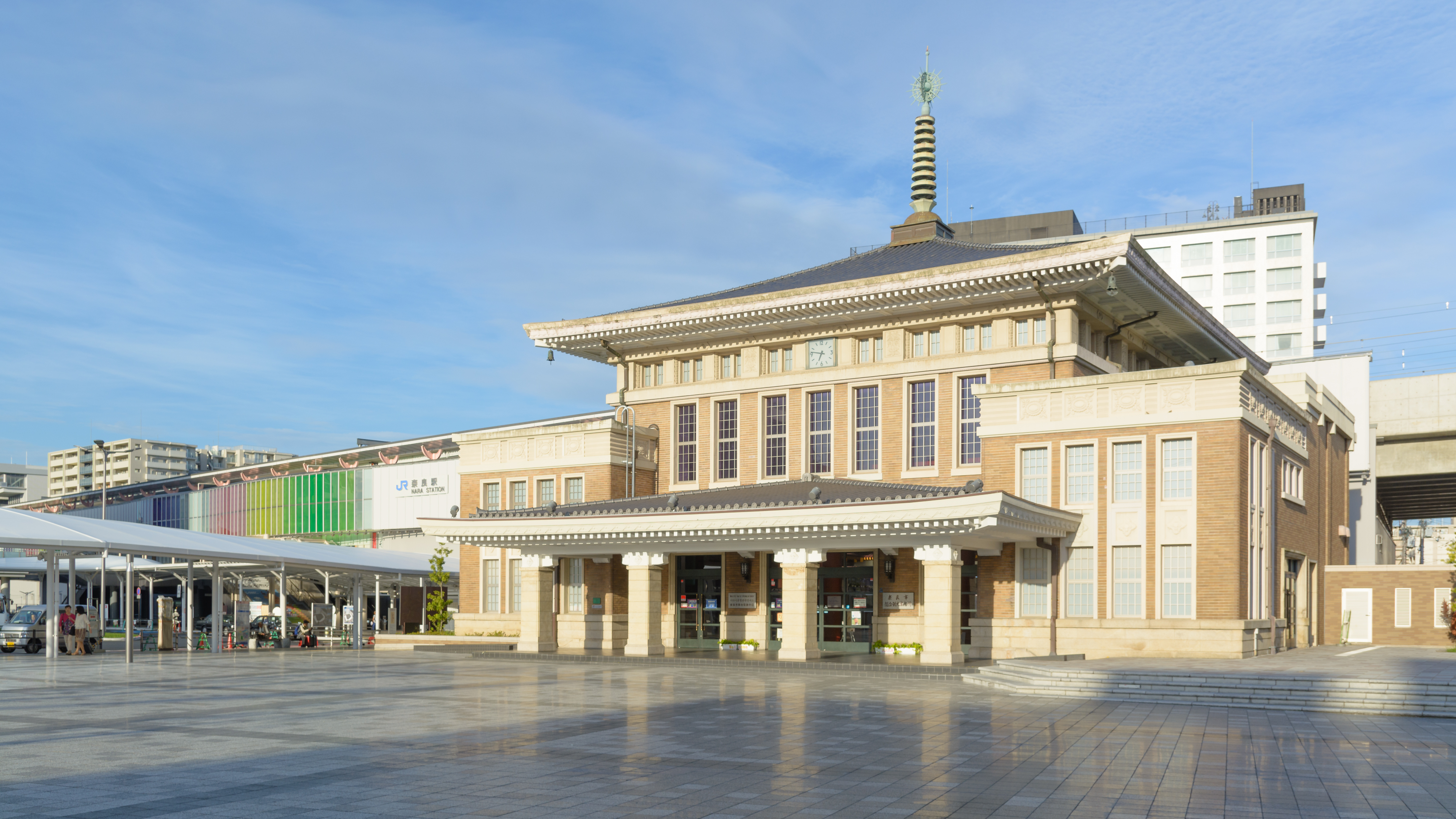
- Nara Station building in September 2014

General information
- Location: 1-1, Sanjo-Hommachi, Nara City; Nara Prefecture; Japan
- Coordinates: 34°40′50.38″N 135°49′8.48″E
- Operator: JR West
- Lines: Q Kansai Main Line (Yamatoji Line); D Nara Line; U Sakurai Line (Man-yō Mahoroba Line)
- Platforms: 3 island platforms
- Tracks: 5
- Connections: Bus terminal

Construction
- Structure type: Elevated

Other information
- Station code: JR-Q36; JR-D21
- Website: Official website

History
- Opened: 27 December 1890; 135 years ago

Passengers
- FY 2023: 33,820 daily

Services
| Preceding station | JR West | Following station |
|---|---|---|
| Narayama towards Kyoto | Nara Line | Terminus |
| Kōriyama towards JR Namba | Yamatoji Line | Narayama towards Kamo |
| Kyōbate towards Takada | Man-yō Mahoroba Line (Sakurai Line) | Terminus |
Track layout
Location
- Location within Nara Prefecture Location within Kansai region Location within Japan

Nara Station (奈良駅, Nara-eki) is a railway station located in Nara, Japan. Operated by West Japan Railway Company (JR West), it is the main stop in the city of Nara on the Kansai Main Line (Yamatoji Line), the terminus for the Sakurai Line (Man-yō Mahoroba Line), and Nara Line trains for Kyoto begin here and run on the Kansai Line to Kizu before diverging. Also, a limited number of Gakkentoshi Line trains terminate here via Kizu during early mornings and late nights.

Yamatoji Line trains from Ōsaka and JR Namba continue past here to Kamo.

== Overview ==
It is the central station of JR in the city of Nara, with many trains departing for Kyoto and Tennoji.

== Layout ==
This station has three elevated island platforms serving five tracks.

=== Platforms ===
| 1 | ■ Man-yō Mahoroba Line | for Tenri, Sakurai, and Takada |
| 1 | ■ Yamatoji Line | for Horyuji, Oji, Tennoji, JR Namba, and Osaka (only in the early morning) |
| no number | ■ Yamatoji Line | for Horyuji, Oji, Tennoji, JR Namba, and Osaka (able to change to the Man-yō Mahoroba Line) |
| 2 | ■ Yamatoji Line | for Horyuji, Oji, Tennoji, JR Namba, and Osaka |
| 3 | ■ Yamatoji Line | for Horyuji, Oji, Tennoji, JR Namba, and Osaka for Kizu and Kamo in the early morning |
| 3 | ■ Nara Line | part of trains for Uji and Kyoto |
| 4 | ■ Gakkentoshi Line | for Doshisha-mae and Shijonawate in the early morning |
| 4, 5 | ■ Yamatoji Line | for Kizu and Kamo |
| 4, 5 | ■ Nara Line | for Uji and Kyoto |

== Passenger statistics ==
According to the "Statistical Yearbook of Nara Prefecture", the average number of passengers per day is as follows.

| Year | Passengers |
|---|---|
| 1993 | 19,894 |
| 1994 | 19,748 |
| 1995 | 20,310 |
| 1996 | 20,796 |
| 1997 | 20,218 |
| 1998 | 20,434 |
| 1999 | 20,332 |
| 2000 | 20,023 |
| 2001 | 20,052 |
| 2002 | 19,574 |
| 2003 | 19,201 |
| 2004 | 18,973 |
| 2005 | 18,700 |
| 2006 | 18,548 |
| 2007 | 18,371 |
| 2008 | 18,362 |
| 2009 | 17,829 |
| 2010 | 18,161 |
| 2011 | 17,250 |
| 2012 | 17,469 |
| 2013 | 17,543 |
| 2014 | 17,486 |
| 2015 | 18,071 |
| 2016 | 18,152 |

== Adjacent stations ==
| « | Service | » |
JR West
Kansai Main Line (Yamatoji Line) including through trains to and from the Gakkentoshi Line
| Narayama | Local | Kōriyama |
| Narayama | Regional Rapid Service (Yamatoji Line) | Kōriyama |
| Narayama | Regional Rapid Service (Gakkentoshi Line) | Terminus |
| Narayama | Rapid Service (Yamatoji Line) | Kōriyama |
| Narayama | Rapid Service (Gakkentoshi Line) | Terminus |
| Narayama | Yamatoji Rapid Service | Kōriyama |
| Terminus | Direct Rapid Service | Kōriyama |
| Terminus | Limited express Mahoroba | Shin-Osaka |

== Bus terminals ==
=== highway buses ===
- Yamato; For Shinjuku Station and Keio Plaza Hotel
- Yamato; For Hon-Atsugi Station, Yokohama Station, Keisei Ueno Station, Tokyo Skytree, Tokyo Disney Resort, Nishi-Funabashi Station, and Kaihimmakuhari Station
- Premium Dream / Seishun Eco Dream; For Shinjuku Station, Tokyo Station, and Shin-Kiba Station
- For Nagoya Station
- Airport Limousine; For Kansai International Airport
- Airport Limousine; For Osaka International Airport

== Gallery ==
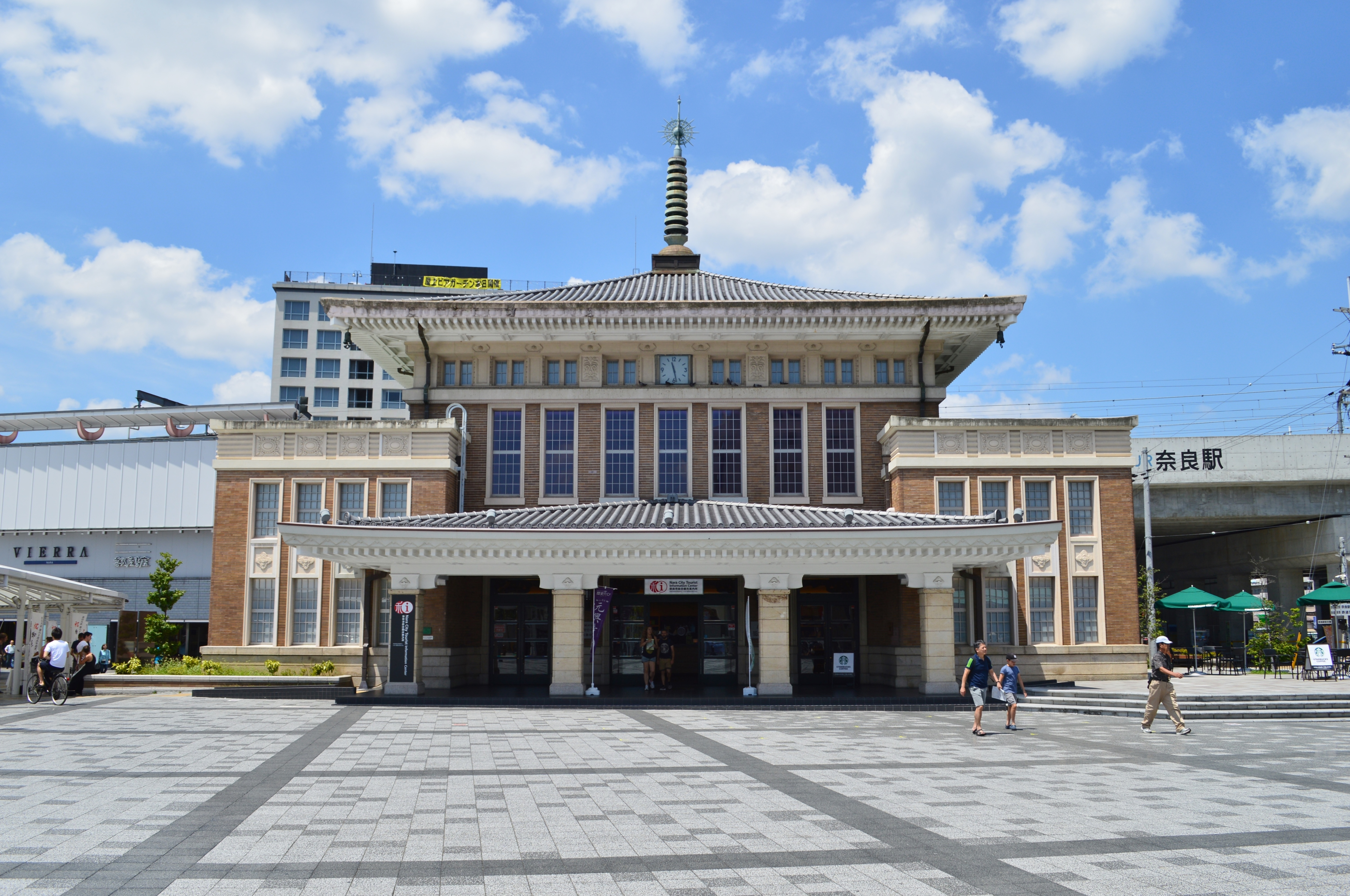
Old building of Nara station, August 2016

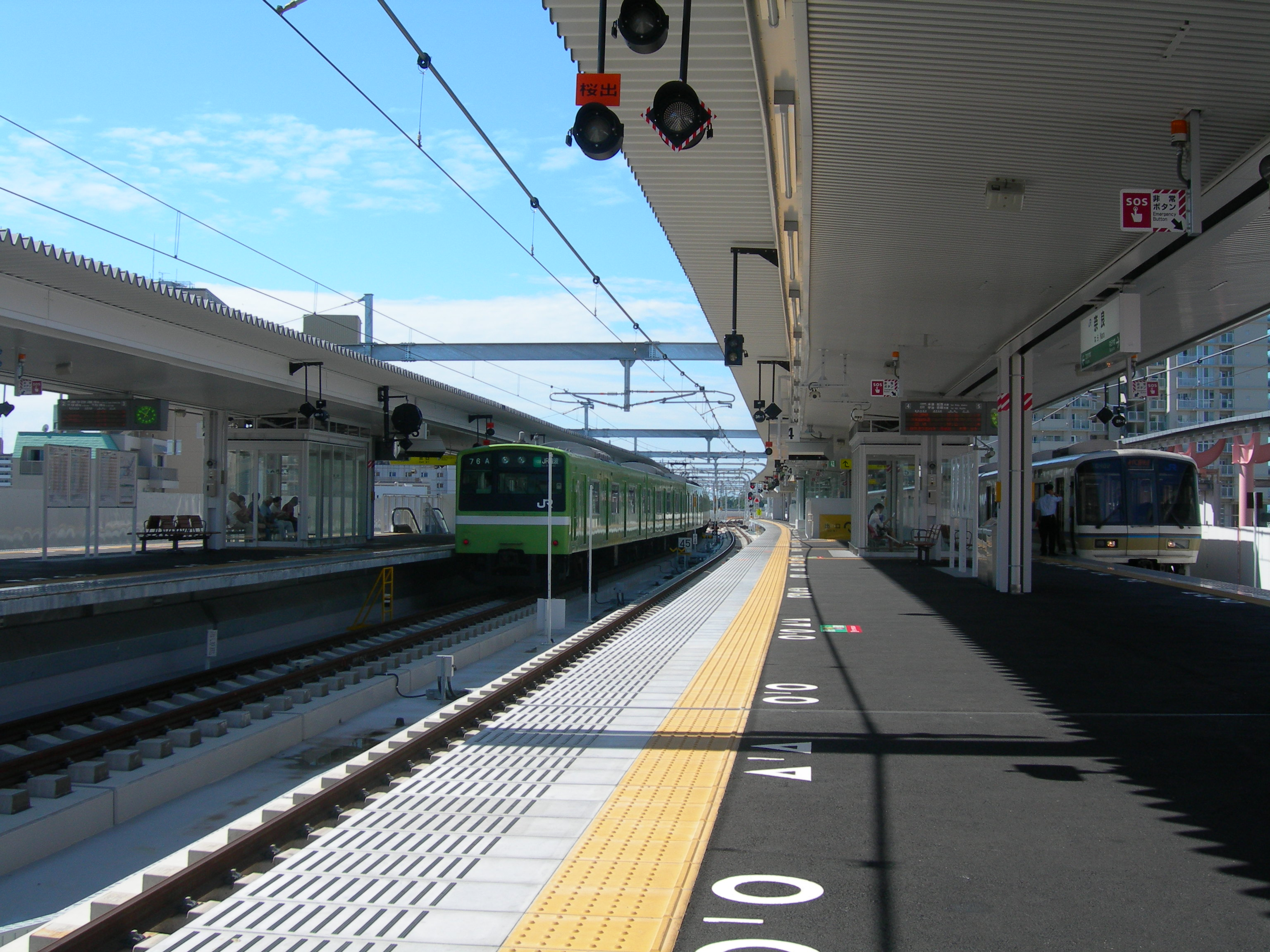
Platforms 4 and 5, August 2008

== See also ==
- Kintetsu Nara Station
- List of railway stations in Japan
