= Takada Station (Nara) =

Railway station in Yamatotakada, Nara Prefecture, Japan

Takada Station 高田駅
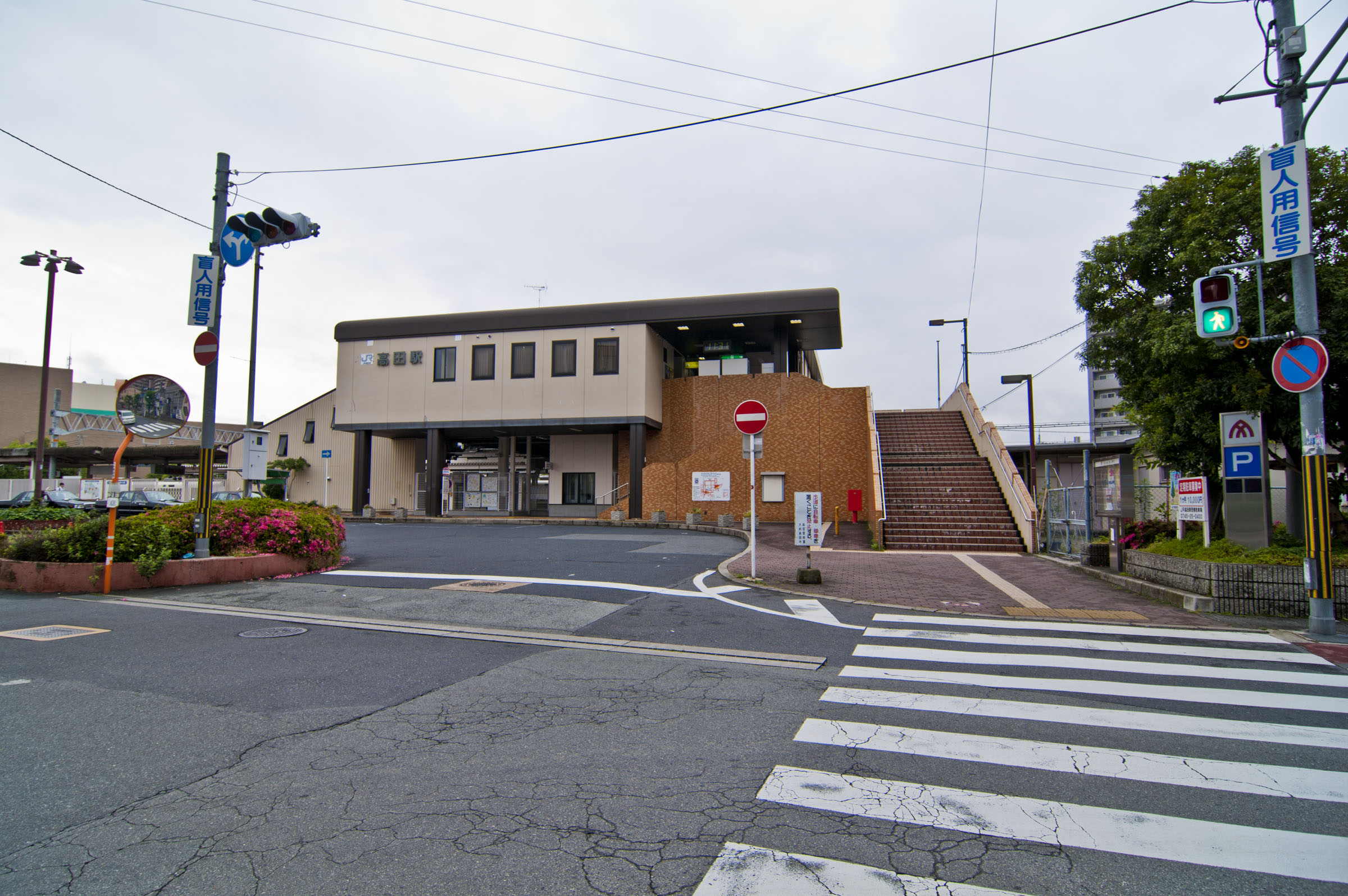
- The west entrance of Takada Station

General information
- Location: 1-1, Takasagochō, Yamatotakada-shi, Nara-ken 635-0081; Japan
- Coordinates: 34°30′58″N 135°44′41″E
- Operator: JR West
- Lines: U Man-yō Mahoroba Line (Sakurai Line); T Wakayama Line
- Distance: Wakayama Line: 11.5 km (7.1 miles) from Ōji; Man-yō Mahoroba Line: 29.4 km (18.3 miles) from Nara via Sakurai
- Platforms: 1 side + 1 island
- Tracks: 3
- Bus stands: 1
- Connections: D Osaka Line (Yamato-Takada); Yamato Takada City Community Bus: Kibō-gō Eastern Route, Southern Route, and Western Route at JR Takada-eki (West Exit); Nara Kotsu: 8, 12, 13, 55, 60, 62, 63, 66, 70, and 76 at Takasagochō / Tenjinbashi

Construction
- Structure type: At grade
- Parking: Available
- Cycle facilities: Available
- Accessible: Yes (2 elevators for the ticket gate, 3 for each platform, and 1 accessible bathroom)

Other information
- Website: Official website

History
- Opened: 1 March 1891; 135 years ago
- Rebuilt: 1984
- Electrified: 1980

Passengers
- FY2020: 1771 daily
Services
| Preceding station | JR West | Following station |
|---|---|---|
| through to Wakayama Line | Man-yō Mahoroba Line (Sakurai Line) Local Rapid | Kanahashi towards Nara |
| Terminus | Man-yō Mahoroba Line (Sakurai Line) Local | Kanahashi towards Nara |
| Yamato-Shinjō towards Ōji | Wakayama Line Local Rapid | JR Goidō towards Wakayama |
| Yamato-Shinjō towards Ōji | Wakayama Line Local | through to Man-yō Mahoroba Line (Sakurai Line) |
Location
- Location within Nara Prefecture Location within Kansai region Location within Japan

Takada Station (高田駅, Takada-eki) is a passenger railway station located in the city of Yamatotakada, Nara, Japan. It is operated by West Japan Railway Company (JR West). There is a transfer to Yamato-Takada Station on the Osaka Line of Kintetsu Railway.

== Lines ==
Although the station is on the Sakurai Line as rail infrastructure, it has been served by the Man-yō Mahoroba Line since 2010 in terms of passenger train services. It is 29.4 kilometers from the starting point of the line at Nara. The station is also served by the Wakayama Line, and is 11.2 kilometers from the starting point of the line at Ōji .

== Layout ==
Takada Station is an above-ground station with two platforms and three tracks, one side platform and one island platform with two tracks, connected by an elevated station building. Platform 1 is mainly used in the mornings and evenings. It can accommodate trains with up to six cars. The station has a Midori no Madoguchi staffed ticket office.

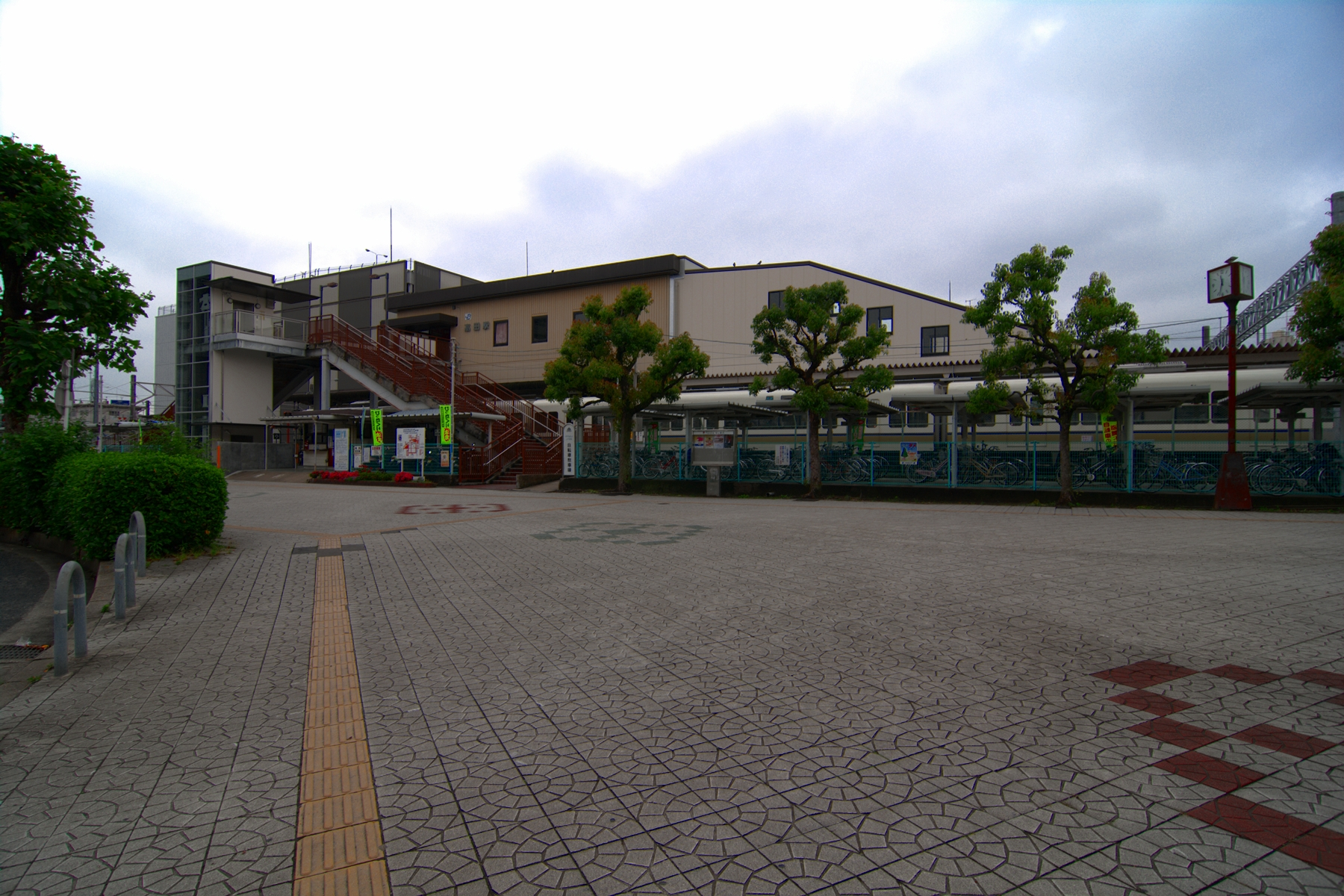
View from the east

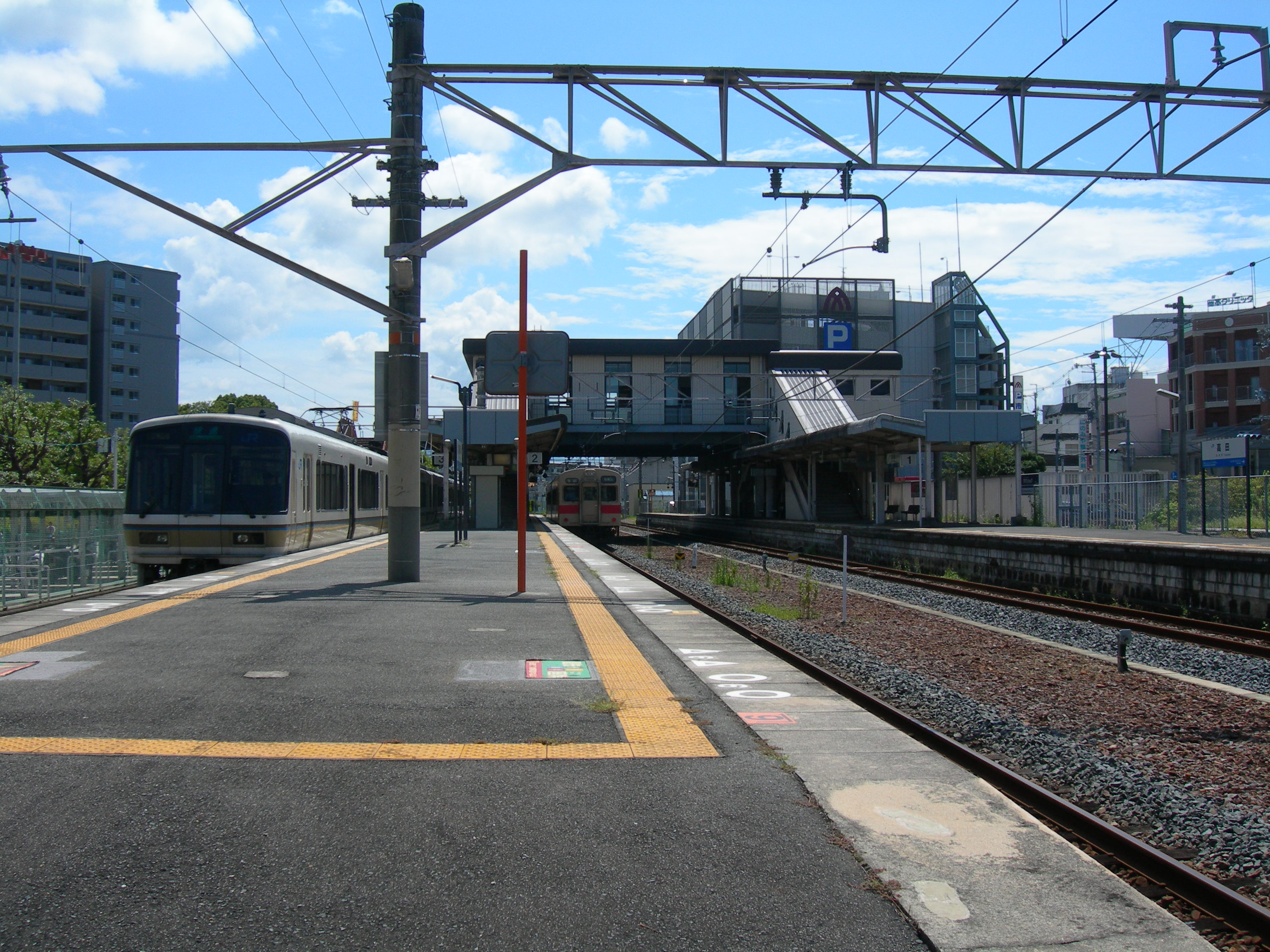
Platforms

=== Platforms ===
| 1 | ■ Wakayama Line—Local | for JR Namba and Ōji |
| 1 | ■ Wakayama Line—Rapid Service | for JR Namba |
| 2 | ■ Wakayama Line—Local | for Wakayama, Kokawa, and Gojō |
| 2 | ■ Wakayama Line—Regional Rapid Service | for Gojō |
| 2 | ■ Wakayama Line—Yamatoji Rapid Service | for Gojō |
| 2 | ■ Man-yō Mahoroba Line—Local | for Nara |
| 3 | ■ Wakayama Line—Local | for Ōji |
| 3 | ■ Wakayama Line—Rapid Service | for JR Namba |
| 3 | ■ Man-yō Mahoroba Line—Local | for Nara |

== History ==
Takada Station was opened on 1 March 1891 as a terminal station on the Osaka Railway. The line was extended to Sakurai on 23 May 1893. On 10 May 1896, the Nanwa Railway began operations from this station to Kuzu Station (now Yoshinoguchi. On 6 June 1900 the Kansai Railway took over the Osaka Railway, followed by the Nanwa Railway on 9 December 1904. The Kansai Railway itself was nationalized on 1 October 1907. On 12 October 1909, the section between Oji Station and Wakayamashi Station, including this station, became the Wakayama Line, and the section from this station to Sakurai Station became the Sakurai Line. The current station building was completed on 1 August 1984. With the privatization of the Japan National Railways (JNR) on 1 April 1987, the station was transferred to JR West.

== Passenger statistics ==
The average daily passenger traffic in fiscal 2020 was 1771 passengers.。

== Surrounding area ==
- Yamatotakada City Hall
- Yamatotakada Municipal Hospital

== See also ==
- List of railway stations in Japan
