= JR Namba Station =

Railway station in Osaka, Japan

JR Namba Station JR難波駅
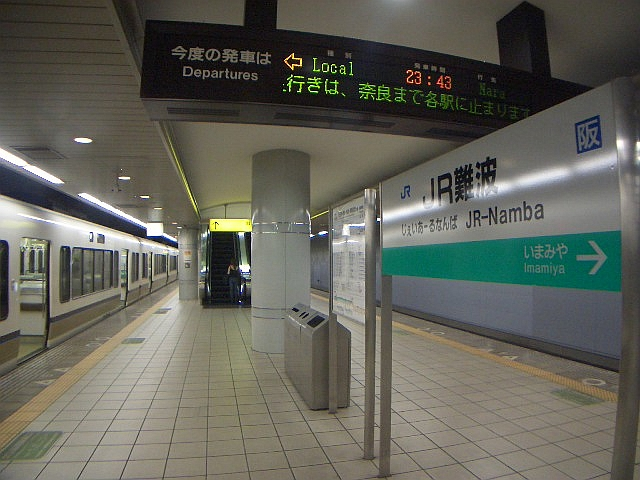
- Underground platform

General information
- Location: 1-4-1 Minatomachi, Naniwa Ward, Osaka City; Osaka Prefecture; Japan
- Coordinates: 34°39′59.1″N 135°29′43.2″E
- Operator: JR West
- Line: Q Yamatoji Line
- Platforms: 2 island platforms
- Tracks: 4
- Connections: Bus terminal

Construction
- Structure type: Underground

Other information
- Station code: JR-Q17

History
- Opened: 14 May 1889; 137 years ago
- Former names: Minatomachi (until 1994)

Services
Preceding station	JR West	Following station
Terminus	Yamatoji Line Local	Imamiya towards Kamo
Terminus	Yamatoji Line Rapid Service	Shin-Imamiya towards Kamo
Location
- Location within Osaka Prefecture Location within Kansai region Location within Japan

JR Namba Station (JR難波駅, Jeiāru-Nanba-eki) is a railway station in Namba, Naniwa Ward, Osaka, Japan, adjacent to Namba Station (Nankai Railway, Osaka Subway) and Ōsaka Namba Station (Kintetsu, Hanshin Railway) operated by the West Japan Railway Company (JR West).

JR Namba is the western terminus of the Kansai Main Line (Yamatoji Line).

== Layout ==
The station has two underground island platforms serving four tracks.

=== Platforms ===
1-4	Q Yamatoji Line	for Tennoji, Oji, Nara, Kamo, and Takada

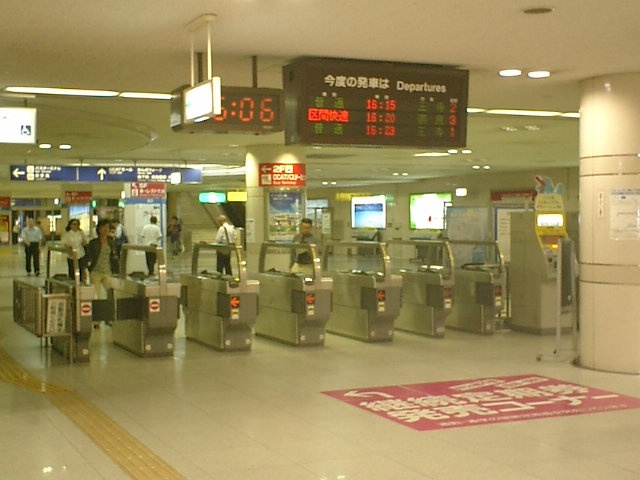
The ticket barriers

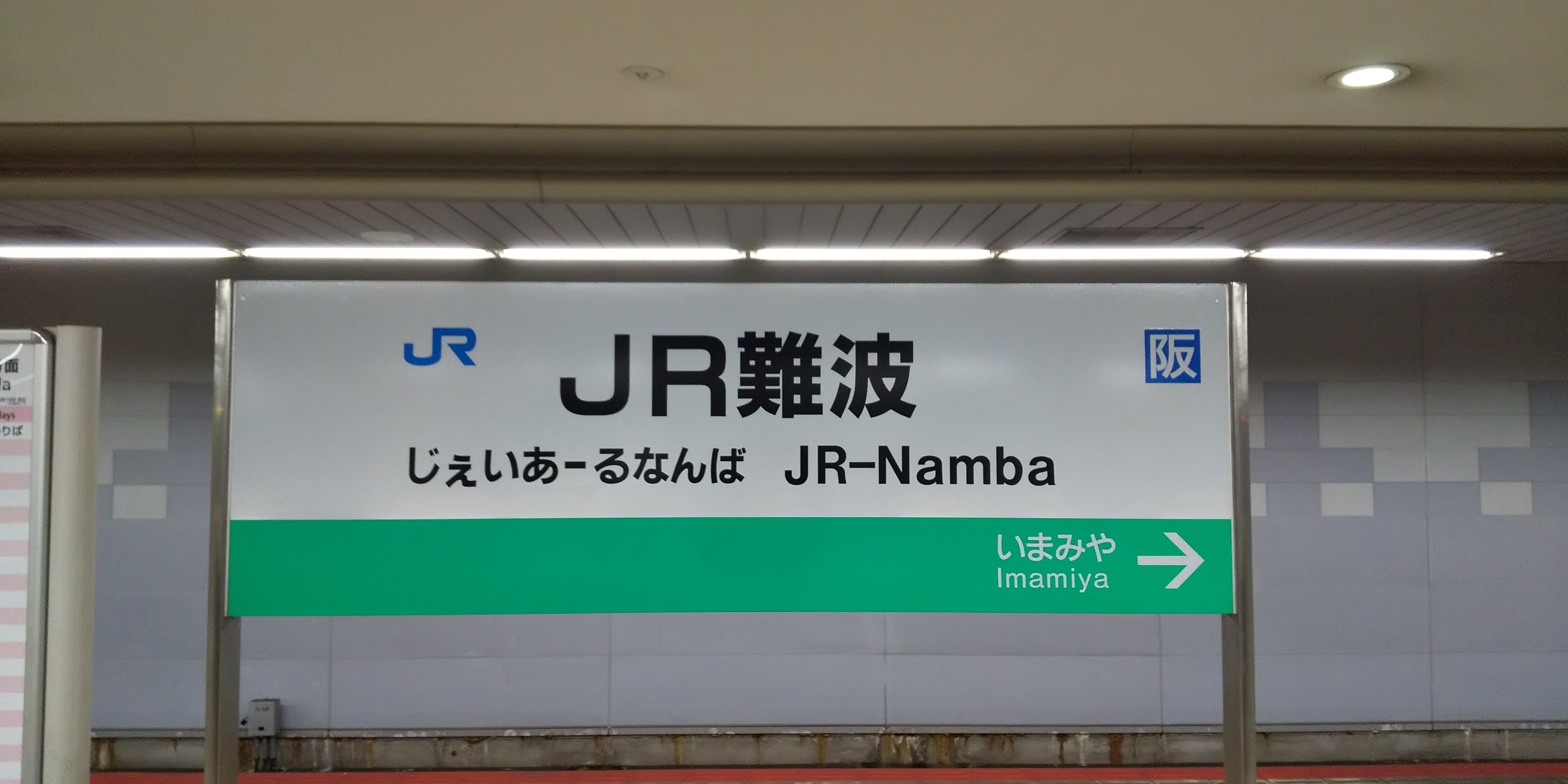
Station sign, January 2020

== History ==
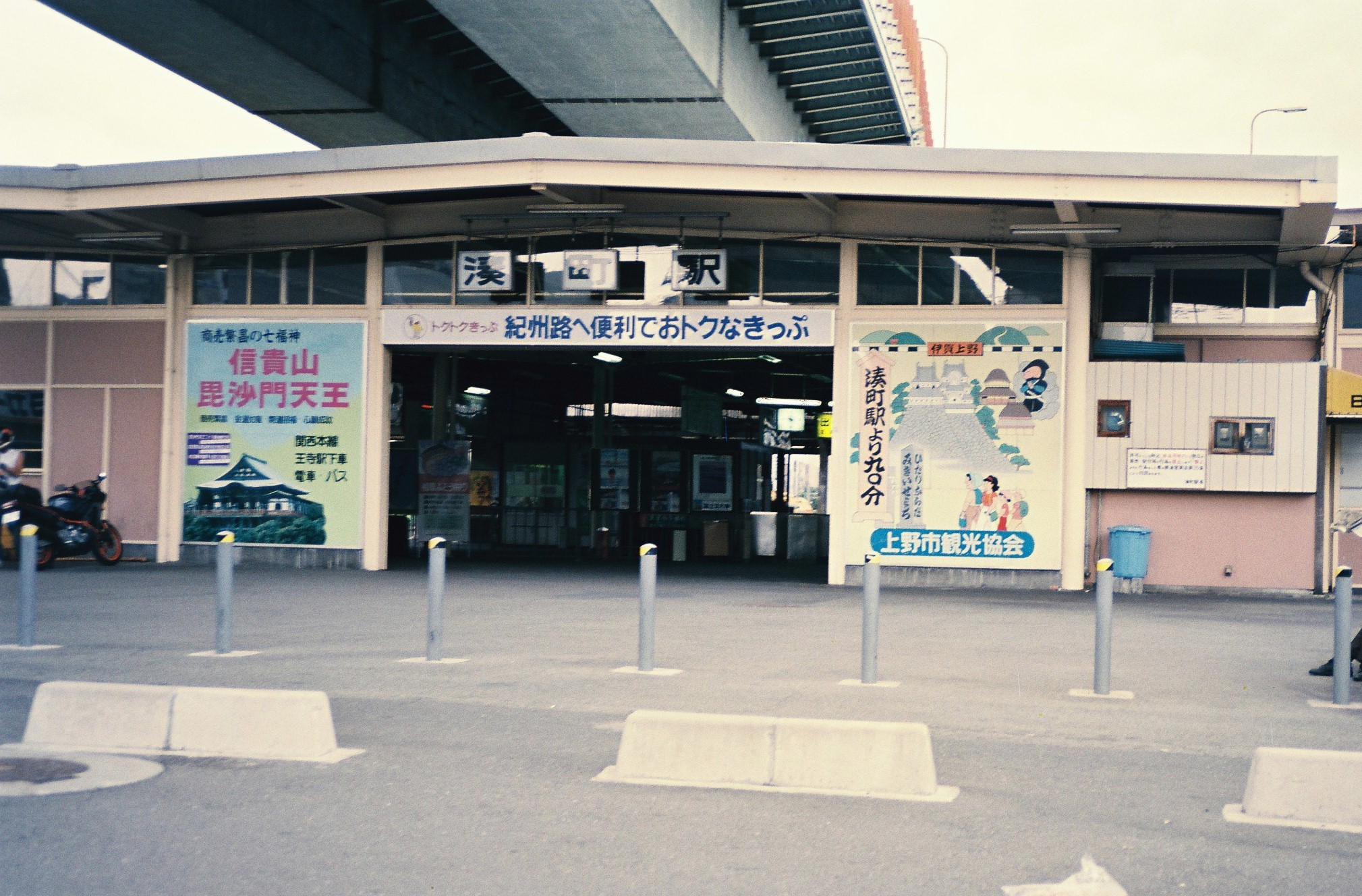
Minatomachi Station in 1987

The station opened as Minatomachi Station (湊町駅) on March 1, 1899. It was renamed JR Namba on September 4, 1994, in collaboration with the opening of Kansai International Airport. New underground facilities opened on March 22, 1996, and replaced the former above-ground station.

=== Future plans ===
The tracks from the Kansai Main Line are expected to be extended north from this station by 2031 with the completion of the Naniwasuji Line. The new line is to be routed through central Osaka and will terminate at new underground platforms at Osaka Station.

== Surrounding area ==
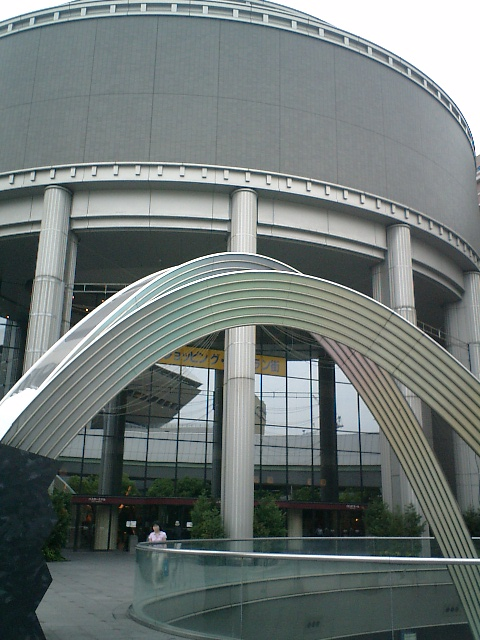
The OCAT building above the station

- Osaka City Air Terminal (OCAT)
- Minatomachi River Place
  - FM Osaka
- Sankei Shimbun Osaka Head Office

=== Bus stops ===
- Osaka City Air Terminal (OCAT)
- JR Namba ekimae (Osaka City Bus)

== See also ==
- List of railway stations in Japan
