= Goidō Station =

Railway station in Kashiba, Nara Prefecture, Japan

Goidō Station 五位堂駅
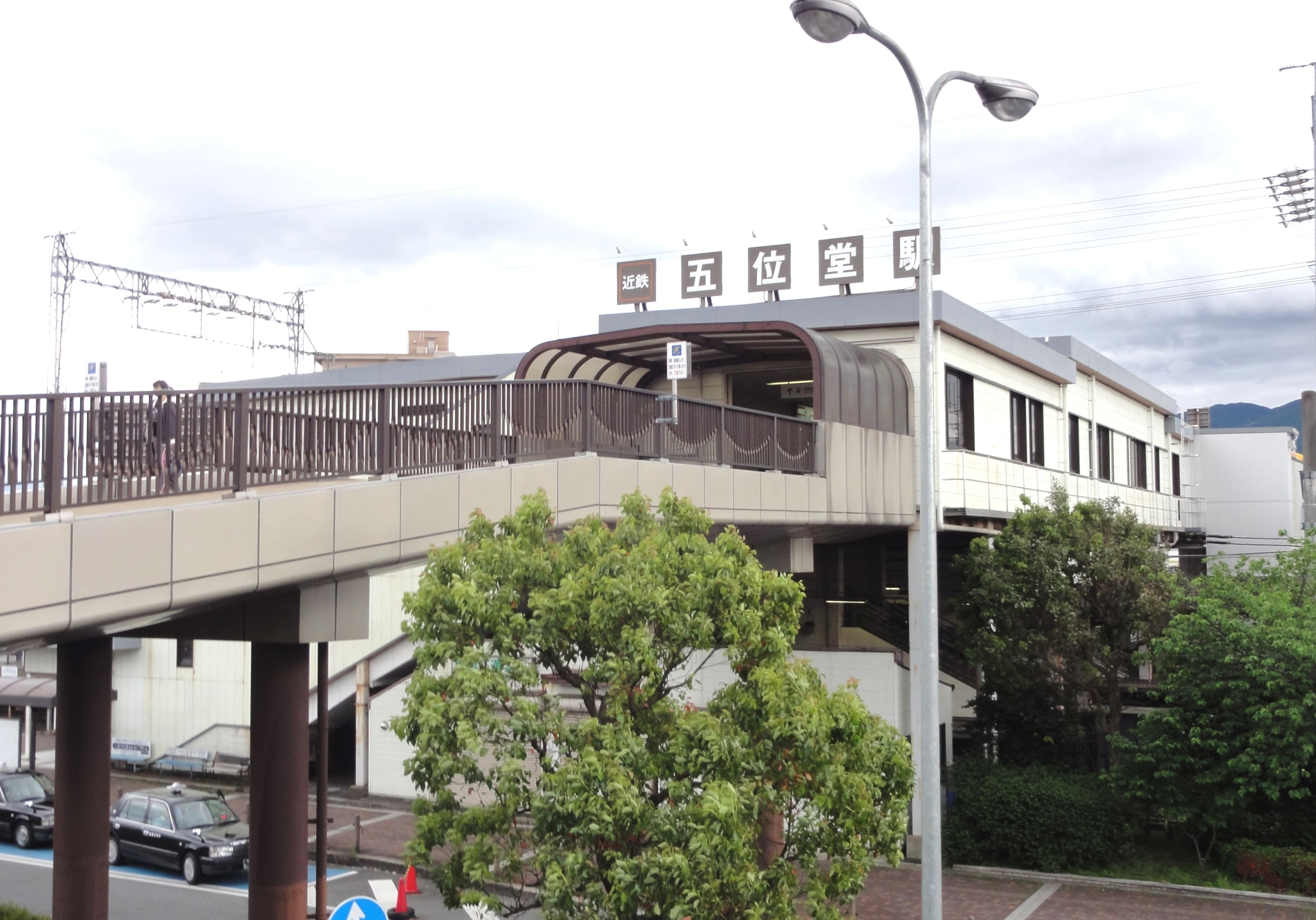
- Sekiya Station in 2012

General information
- Location: 268, Kawaraguchi, Kashiba-shi, Nara-ken 639-0225; Japan
- Coordinates: 34°32′5.18″N 135°43′5.32″E
- System: Kintetsu Railway commuter rail station
- Owner: Kintetsu Railway
- Operator: Kintetsu Railway
- Line: D Osaka Line
- Distance: 27.1 km (16.8 miles) from Osaka Uehommachi
- Platforms: 2 island platforms
- Tracks: 4
- Train operators: Kintetsu Railway
- Connections: Bus terminal

Construction
- Cycle facilities: Available
- Accessible: Yes

Other information
- Station code: D23
- Website: www.kintetsu.co.jp/station/station_info/station02025.html

History
- Opened: 1 July 1927

Passengers
- FY2019: 14185 daily

Services
Preceding station	Kintetsu Railway	Following station
Kintetsu Shimoda towards Osaka Uehommachi	Osaka Line Local Semi-Express	Tsukiyama towards Ise-Nakagawa
Kawachi-Kokubu towards Osaka Uehommachi	Osaka Line Express	Yamato-Takada towards Ise-Nakagawa
Tsuruhashi towards Osaka Uehommachi	Osaka Line Rapid Express	Yamato-Takada towards Ise-Nakagawa
Location

Goidō Station (五位堂駅, Goidō-eki) is a passenger railway station located in the city of Kashiba, Nara Prefecture, Japan. It is operated by the private transportation company, Kintetsu Railway. It is the central station in the eastern area of the city.

== Line ==
Goidō Station is served by the Osaka Line and is 27.1 kilometers from the starting point of the line at Ōsaka Uehommachi.

== Layout ==
The station is an above-ground station with two island platforms and four tracks, and an elevated station building. The effective length of the platform was increased to 215 meters in 1987, and it can accommodate 10 carriage length trains. There are three entrances and exits, located in the north, northeast, and southwest, but there is only one ticket gate. The station is staffed.

== Platforms ==
1, 2	■ D Osaka Line	for Yamato-Yagi, and Nabari
3, 4	■ D Osaka Line	for Kawachi-Kokubu, and Osaka Uehommachi

== History ==
Goidō Station was opened 1 July 1927 as a station on the Osaka Electric Tramway Yagi Line. It became a Kansai Express Railway station due to a company merger with Sangu Express Railway on 15 March 1941, and through a subsequent merger became a station on the Kintetsu Railway on 1 July 1944.

== Passenger statistics ==
In fiscal 2019 the station was used by an average of 14,185 passengers daily (boarding passengers only).

== Surrounding area ==
- Kio University
- Nara Prefectural Kashiba High School
- Kashiba City Kashiba East Junior High School
- JR Goido Station (JR West Wakayama Line)

== See also ==
- List of railway stations in Japan
