= Tsukiyama Station =

Railway station in Yamatotakada, Nara Prefecture, Japan

Tsukiyama Station 築山駅
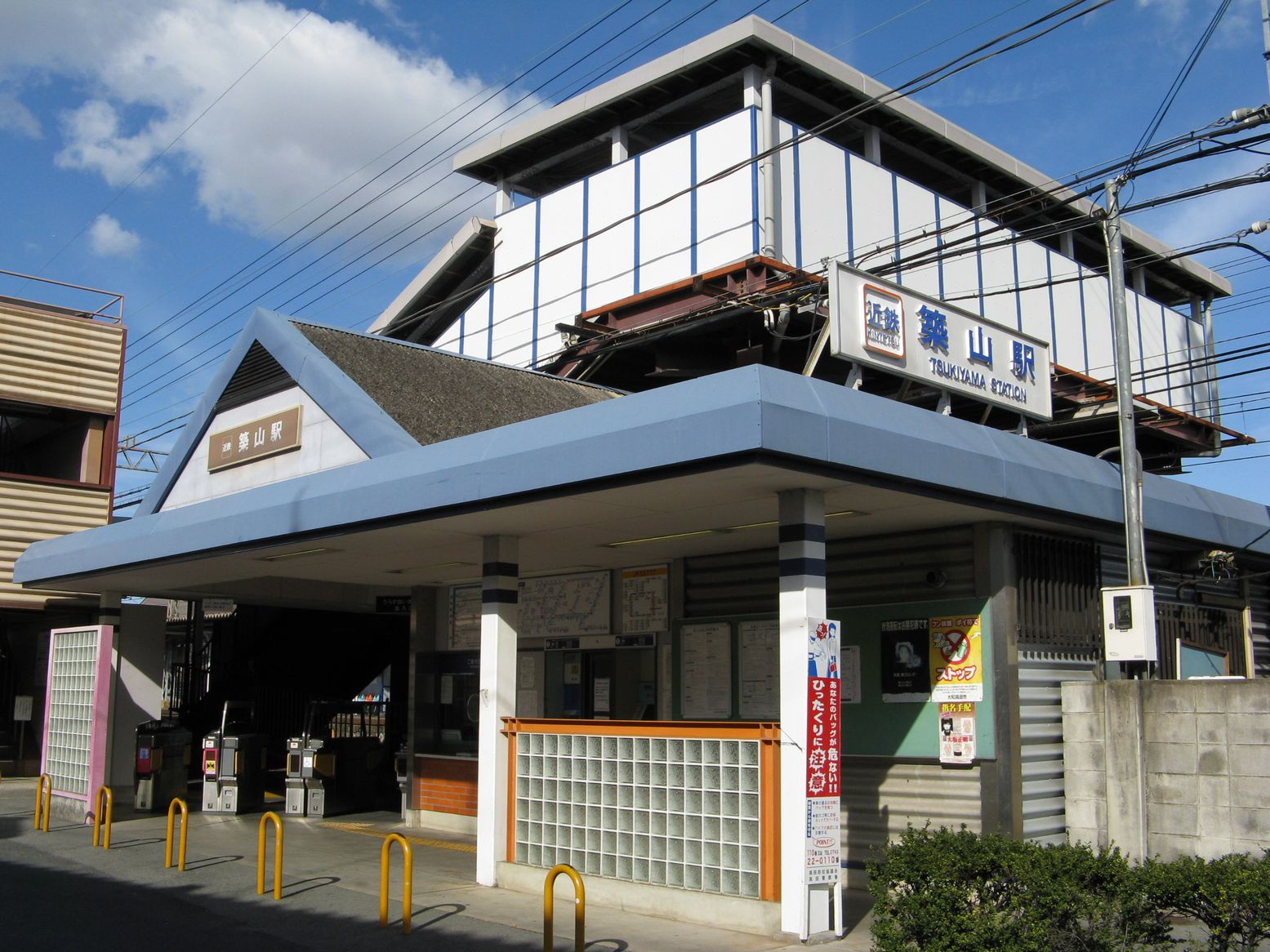
- Tsukiyama Station in December 2008

General information
- Location: Tsukiyama, Yamatotakada-shi, Nara-ken 635-0071; Japan
- Coordinates: 34.5259°N 135.7330°E
- Operator: Kintetsu Railway
- Line: D Osaka Line
- Distance: 28.8 km from Osaka-Uehommachi
- Platforms: 2 side platforms
- Tracks: 2

Other information
- Status: Unattended
- Station code: D24
- Website: Official website

History
- Opened: 1 July 1927

Passengers
- FY2019: 1408 daily

Services
Preceding station	Kintetsu Railway	Following station
Goidō towards Osaka Uehommachi	Osaka Line Local Semi-Express	Yamato-Takada towards Ise-Nakagawa
Location
- Location within Nara Prefecture Location within Japan

Tsukiyama Station (築山駅, Tsukiyama-eki) is a passenger railway station located in the city of Yamatotakada, Nara Prefecture, Japan. It is operated by the private transportation company, Kintetsu Railway.

== Line ==
Tsukiyama Station is served by the Osaka Line and is 28.8 kilometers from the starting point of the line at Osaka-Uehommachi.

== Layout ==
The station has two side platforms on the ground, serving one track each. The station building (ticket gates) are on the platform 2 side, and are connected to platform 1 by a footbridge. The effective length of the platform is six cars. The station is unattended.

=== Platforms ===
1	■ Osaka Line	for Yamato-Takada, Yamato-Yagi, Haibara, and Nabari
2	■ Osaka Line	for Goido, Fuse, and Osaka Uehommachi

== History ==
Tsukiyama Station opened on 1 July 1927 on the Osaka Electric Tramway Yagi Line (now the Osaka Line) between Onji and Takada (now Yamatotakada). On 15 March 1941, the line merged with the Sangu Express Railway and became the Kansai Express Railway's Osaka Line. This line was merged with the Nankai Electric Railway on 1 June 1944 to form Kintetsu.

== Passenger statistics ==
In fiscal 2019, the station was used by an average of 1408 passengers daily (boarding passengers only).

== Surrounding area ==
- Otani Park, built around a small ancient burial mound and with a fountain and pond
- Tsukiyama Children's Park, which is also built on a burial mount and is next to the much larger Tsukiyama burial mound, which is not accessible to the public.

== See also ==
- List of railway stations in Japan
