= Yamato-Takada Station =

Railway station in Yamatotakada, Nara Prefecture, Japan

Yamato-Takada Station 大和高田駅
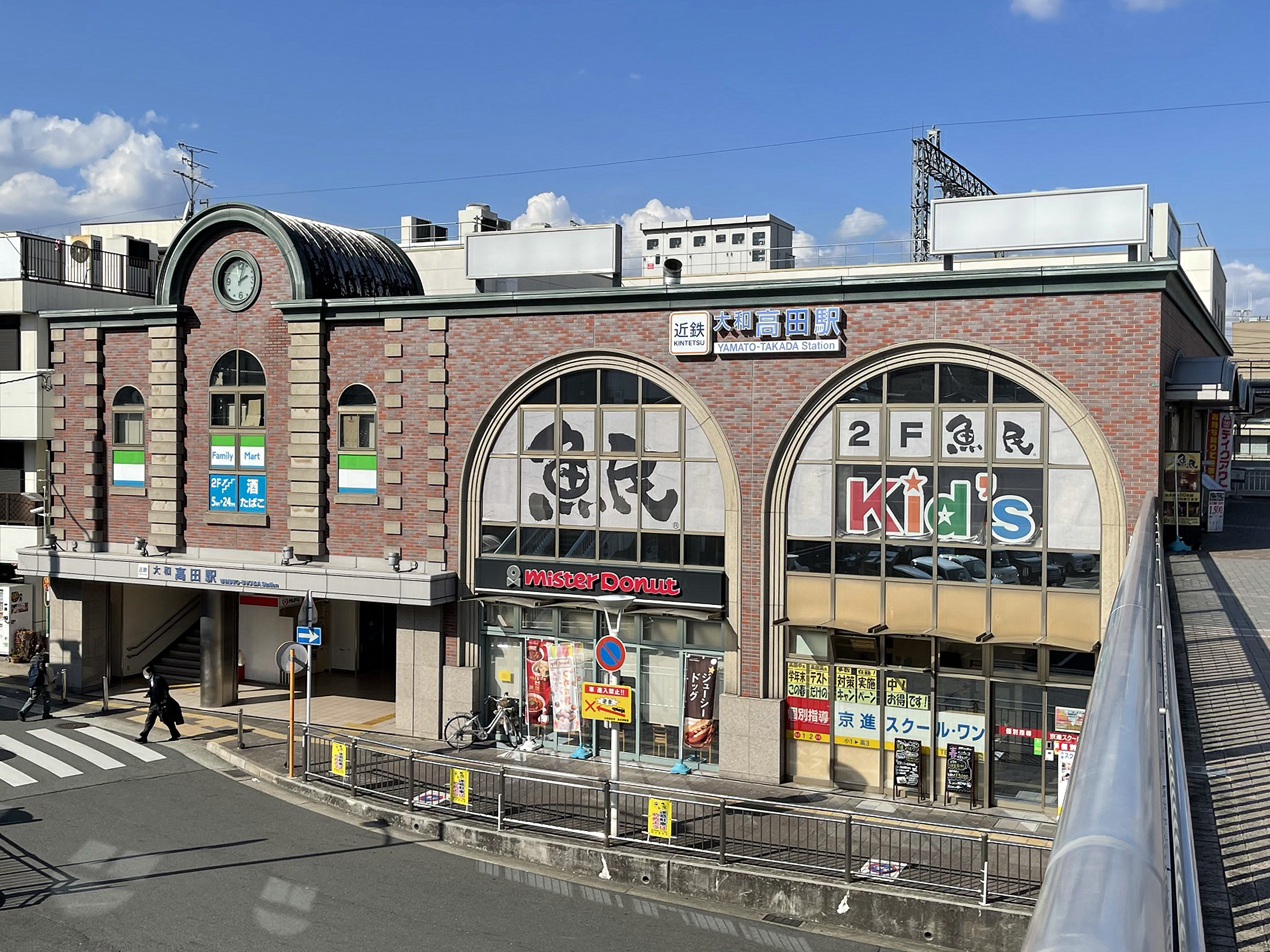
- Yamato-Takada Station in 2021

General information
- Location: 14 Kitahonmachi, Yamatotakada-shi, Nara-ken 635-0097; Japan
- Coordinates: 34°31′11.52″N 135°44′32.49″E
- Operator: Kintetsu Railway
- Line: D Osaka Line
- Distance: 29.9 km from Osaka-Uehommachi
- Platforms: 2 side platforms
- Tracks: 2

Other information
- Status: Staffed
- Station code: D25
- Website: Official website

History
- Opened: 1 March 1925
- Former names: Takada (to 1928); Daiki-Takada (to 1941)

Passengers
- FY2019: 8223 daily

Services
Preceding station	Kintetsu Railway	Following station
Tsukiyama towards Osaka Uehommachi	Osaka Line Local Semi-Express	Matsuzuka towards Ise-Nakagawa
Goidō towards Osaka Uehommachi	Osaka Line Express Rapid Express	Yamato-Yagi towards Ise-Nakagawa
Location
- Location within Nara Prefecture Location within Japan

Yamato-Takada Station (大和高田駅, Yamato-Takada-eki) is a passenger railway station located in the city of Yamatotakada, Nara Prefecture, Japan. It is operated by the private transportation company, Kintetsu Railway.

== Line ==
Yamato-Takada Station is served by the Osaka Line and is 29.9 kilometers from the starting point of the line at Osaka-Uehommachi.

== Layout ==
The station has two side platforms on the ground, serving one track each. The concourse is on the first floor of the station building, and the platforms are on the second floor. There is one ticket gate on the first floor, and another ticket gate on the second floor that leads directly to platform 2. The effective length of the platform is 10 cars.. The station is staffed.

=== Platforms ===
1	■ Osaka Line	for Yamato-Yagi,, Nabari, and Kashikojima
2	■ Osaka Line	for Goido, Kawachi-Kokubu,Osaka Uehommachi, and Osaka Namba

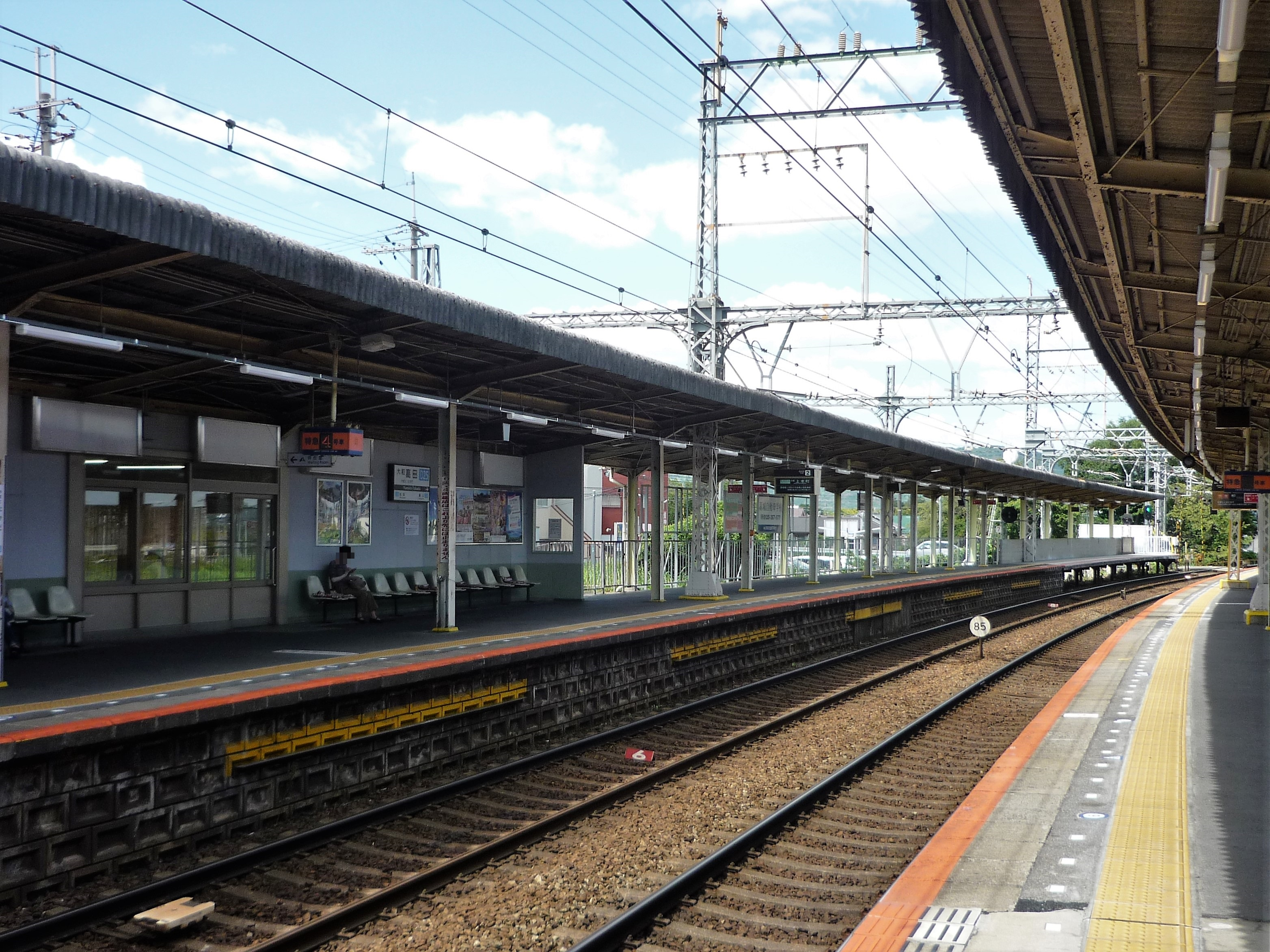
Platforms

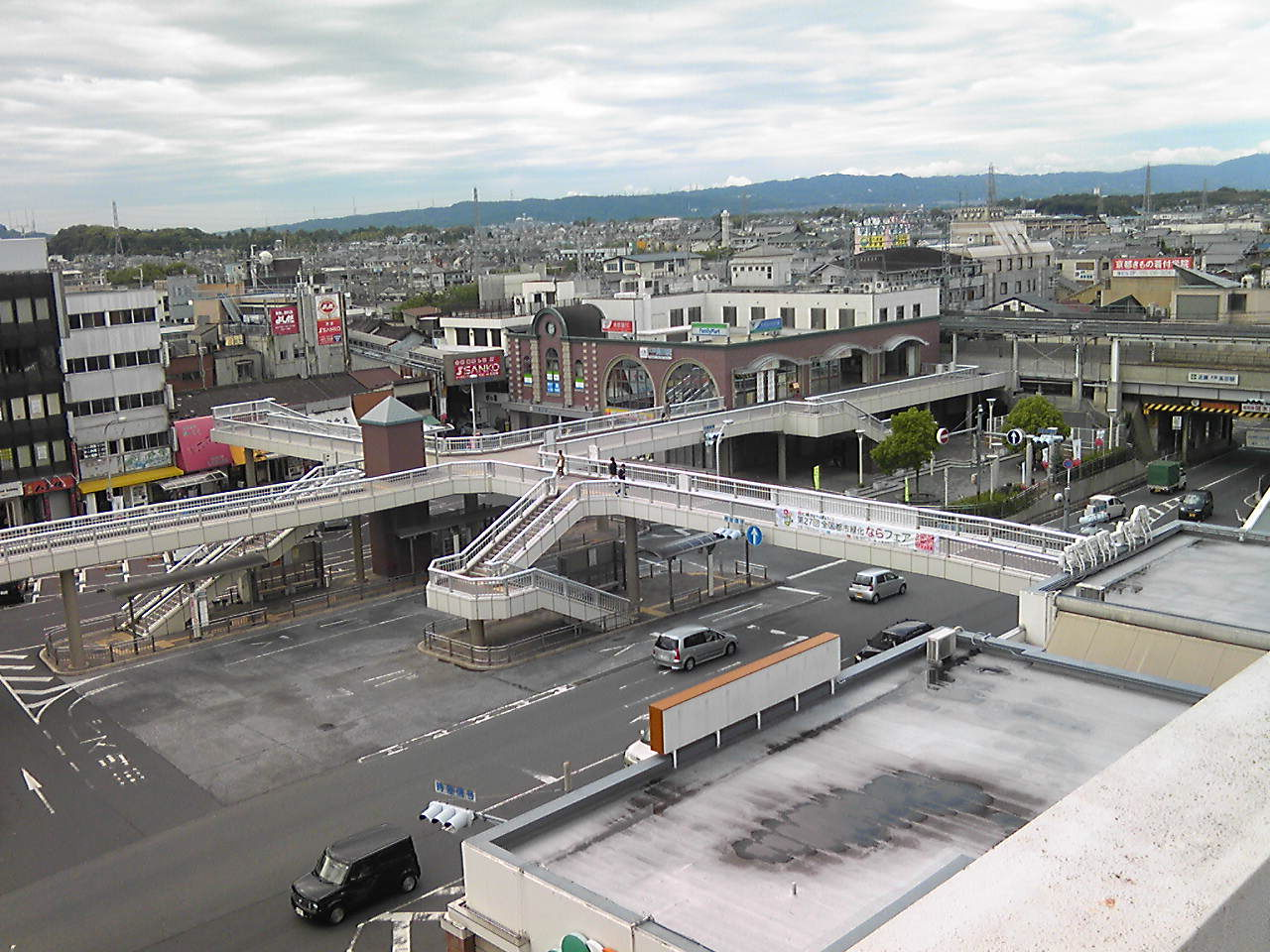
Station plaza

== History ==
Yamato-Takada Station opened on 21 March 1925 as Takada Station as the terminus of the Osaka Electric Tramway Yagi Line (now the Osaka Line) from Yamato-Yagi. In August 1928, the station was renamed Daiki Takada Station (大軌高田駅). On 15 March 1941, the line merged with the Sangu Express Railway and became the Kansai Express Railway's Osaka Line, and the station was renamed Yamato-Takada Station. This line was merged with the Nankai Electric Railway on 1 June 1944 to form Kintetsu. The current station building was completed in 2001.

== Passenger statistics ==
In fiscal 2019, the station was used by an average of 8223 passengers daily (boarding passengers only).

== Surrounding area ==
It is the central station of Yamatotakada city, and the area in front of the station is a busy shopping district.

- Takada Station - West Japan Railway Company Wakayama Line/Sakurai Line (approximately 5 minutes on foot)
- Japan National Route 165

== See also ==
- List of railway stations in Japan
