= Bakuya Kofun =

Kofun period burial mound in Japan

- 牧野古墳 (Japanese)
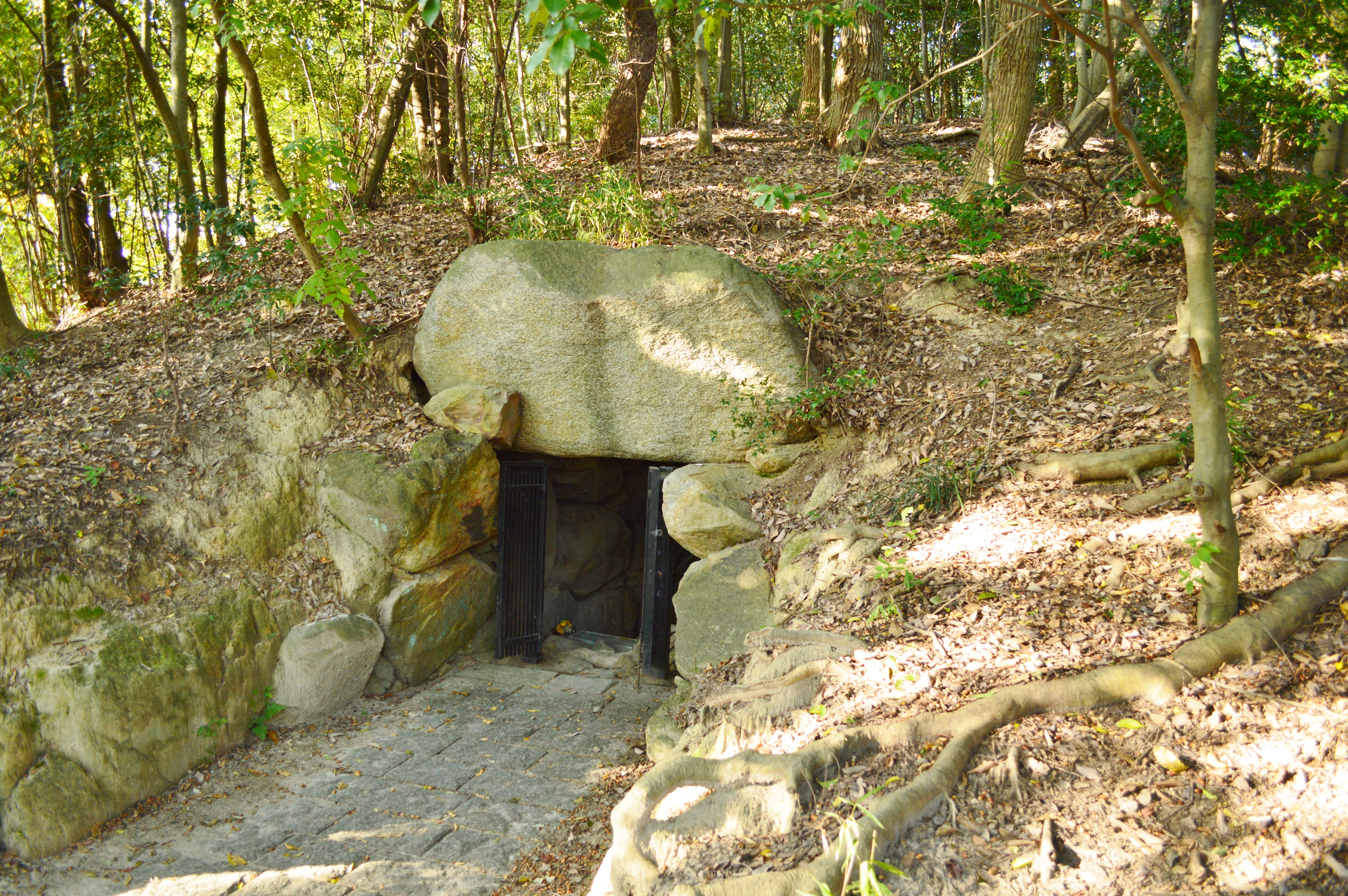
- Bakuya Kofun

- Bakuya Kofun Bakuya Kofun (Japan)
- 34°33′15.45″N 135°43′26.6″E
- Type: Kofun
- Periods: Kofun period
- Location: Kōryō, Nara, Japan
- Region: Kansai region

History
- Built: c.6th century

Site notes
- Public access: Yes (no facilities)
- National Historic Site of Japan

Bakuya Kofun (牧野古墳) is a burial mound, located in the Umamikita neighborhood of the town of Kōryō, Nara Prefecture in the Kansai region of Japan. The tumulus was designated a National Historic Site of Japan in 1983. It is one of the burial mounds that make up the Umami Kofun cluster.

== Overview ==
The Bakuya Kofun is an enpun (円墳)-style circular burial mound built on the tip of a small ridge in the center of the Umami Hills in western Nara Prefecture. The mound measures 48 to 60 meters in diameter and is 13 meters high. The burial mound is built in three tiers, but only the top tier (the third tier) is completely circular due to the tiering. Although fragments of haniwa clay figurines have been found on the outside of the mound, none remain in their original position, and it is assumed that they were taken from other kofun for the purpose of dressing up the outside of the mound. The burial facility is a double-sided horizontal-entry stone burial chamber with an opening facing south. It is one of the largest stone chambers in Nara Prefecture, measuring 17.1 meters in total length. The stone used is huge granite monoliths, although the Umami Hills are clay mountains that produce no stone, but the largest stone weighs nearly 60 tons, making it the second largest in Nara Prefecture after the ceiling stone of the Ishibutai Kofun. Inside the burial chamber were one hollowed-out house-shaped stone coffin and one combined house-shaped stone coffin (not extant) are placed inside the chamber. Both stone coffins have been extensively damaged by robbers; however in archaeological excavations starting in 1983, over 20,000 items of grave goods were found in the ground around the stone coffins and in the passageways. Among the ornaments excavated were gold rings and various beads (gilt bronze gardenia beads, small glass beads, and millet beads), while horse equipment included two sets of gilt bronze-plated stirrups made of iron, a fence with metal rims, a heart-shaped mirror panel, and apricot leaves. Weapons included a silver-plated iron sword and nearly 400 iron arrowheads, and among the containers concentrated in the passageway was a gilt bronze-plated wooden container and 58 pieces of Sue ware pottery, which indicate that the tomb was built between the second half and the end of the 6th century, during the late Kofun period.

It is one of the few burial mounds in the Umami Kofun Group that has a horizontal entry burial chamber. The identity of the buried person is uncertain, but from the size of the mound, the size of the burial chamber, and the abundance of grave goods the most likely theory is that this is the grave of Prince Osasakahikohito, eldest son of Emperor Bidatsu. Currently, the site has been developed as Bakuya Historical Site Park, and access to the burial chamber is restricted, but it is open to the public for a certain period of the year. It is approximately three kilometers northeast of Kashiba Station on the JR West Wakayama Line.

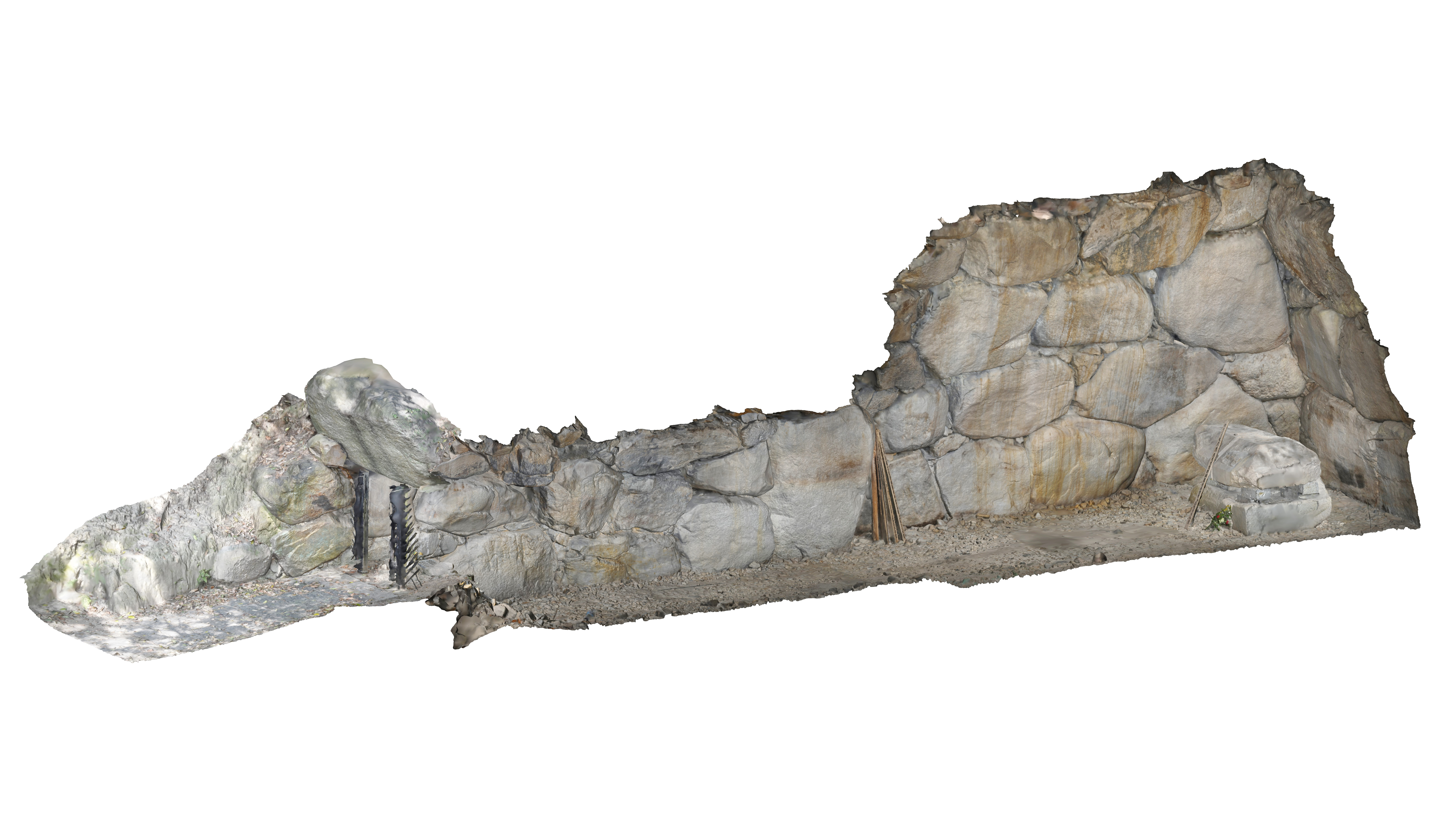
3D model of the Bakuya Kofun burial chamber

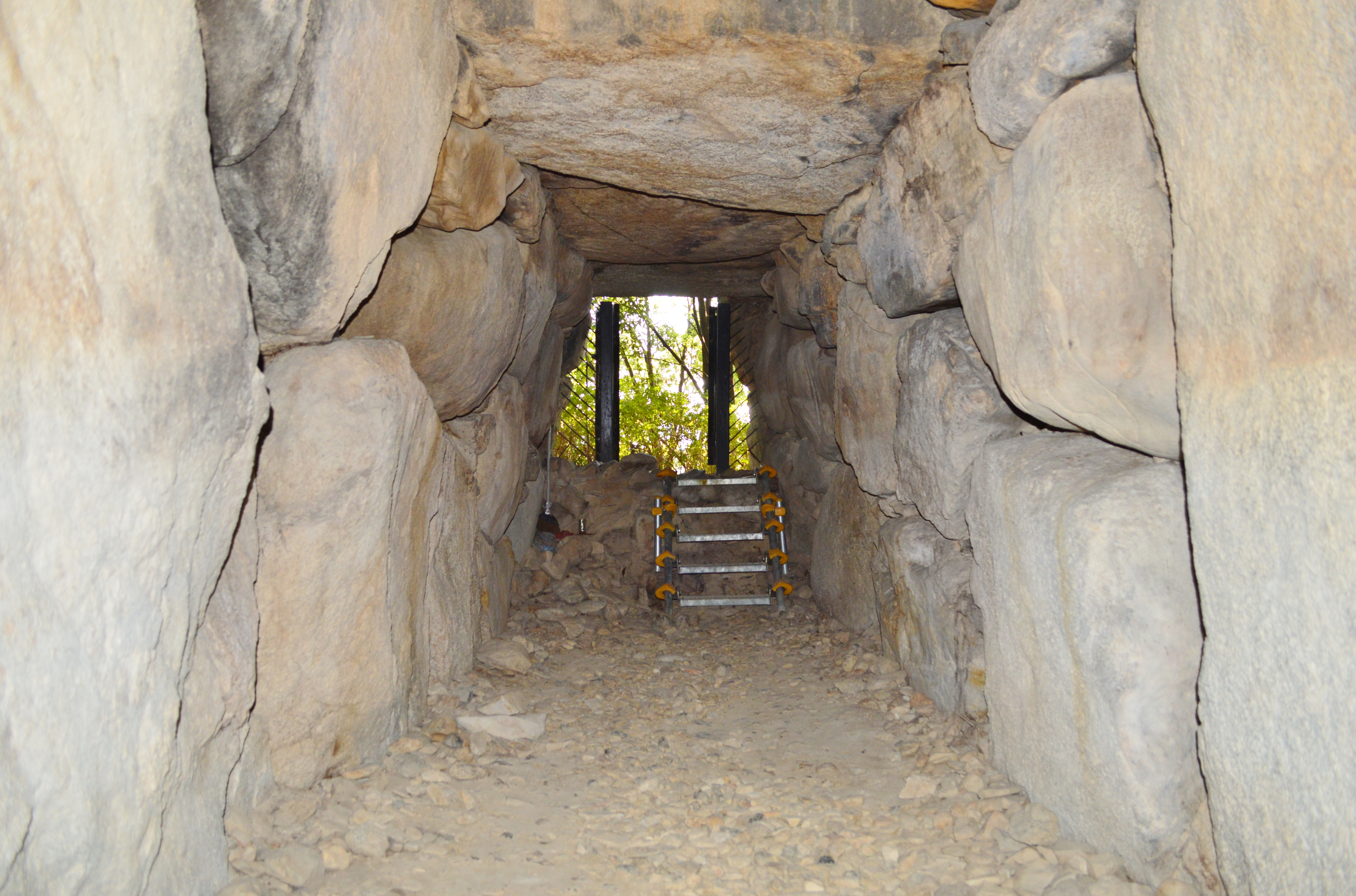
Passageway of Bakuya Kofun looking towards entry

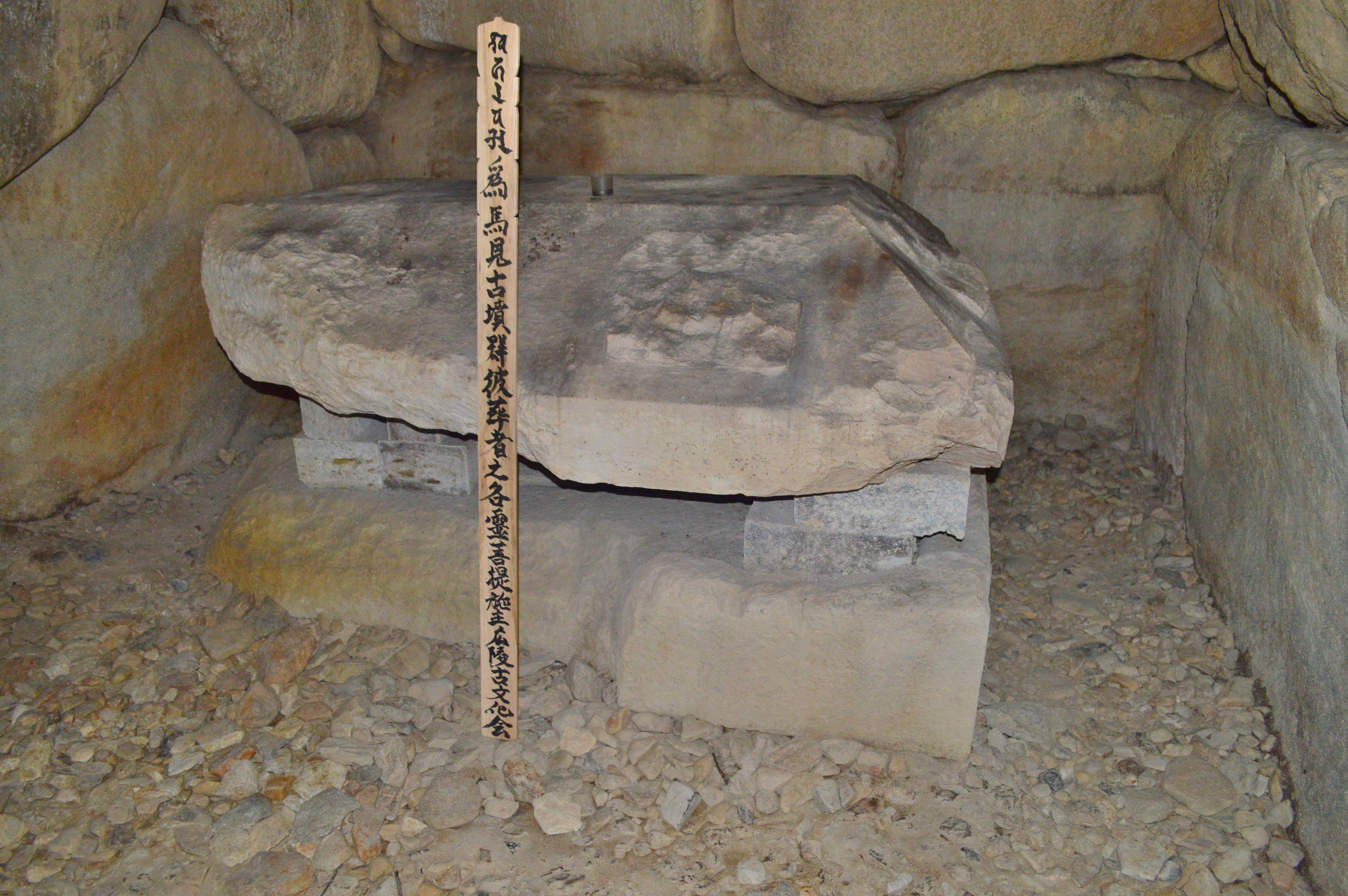
Inside the burial chamber of Bakuya Kofun with fragments of stone coffin

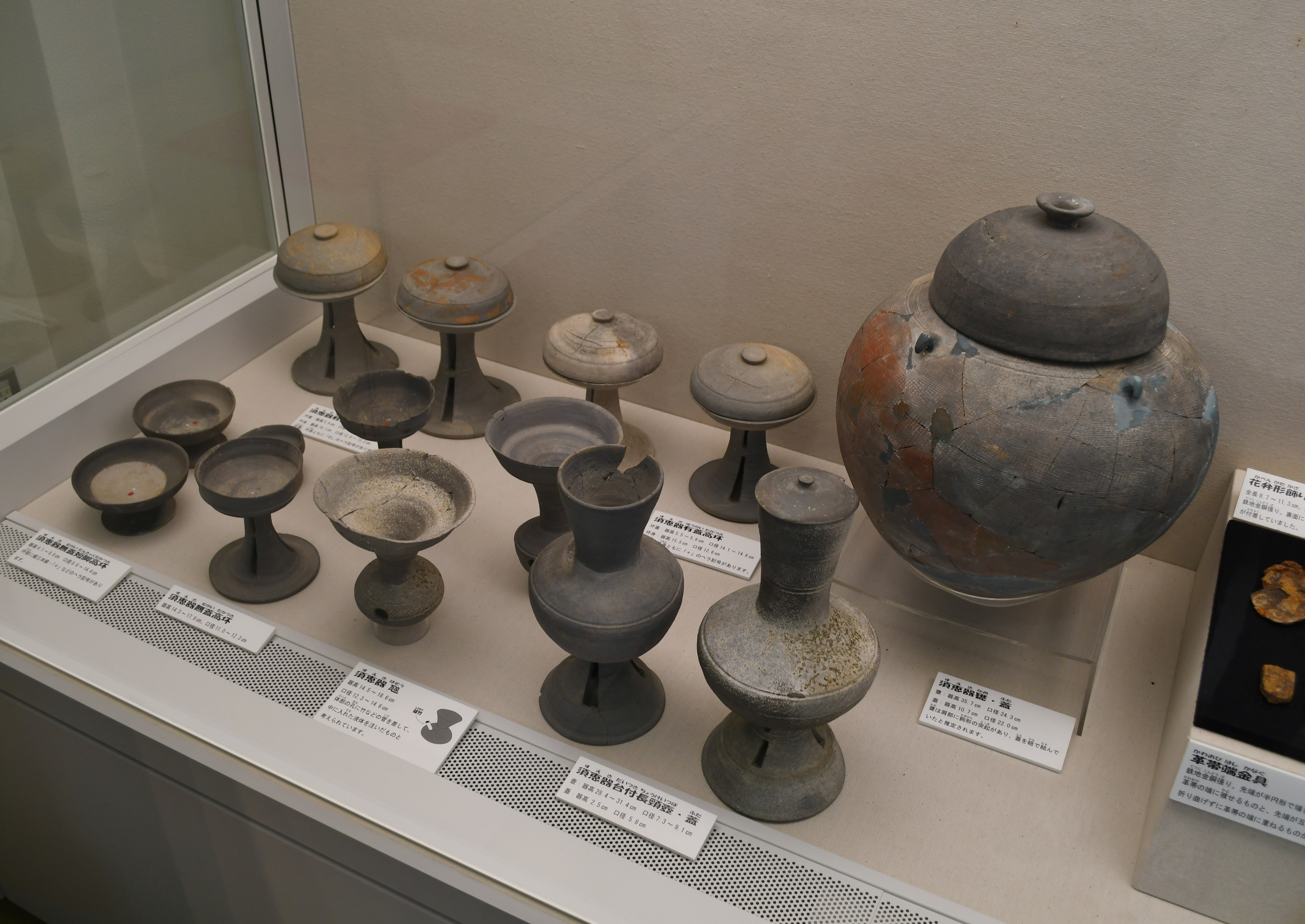
Sue ware excavated from Bakuya tumulus

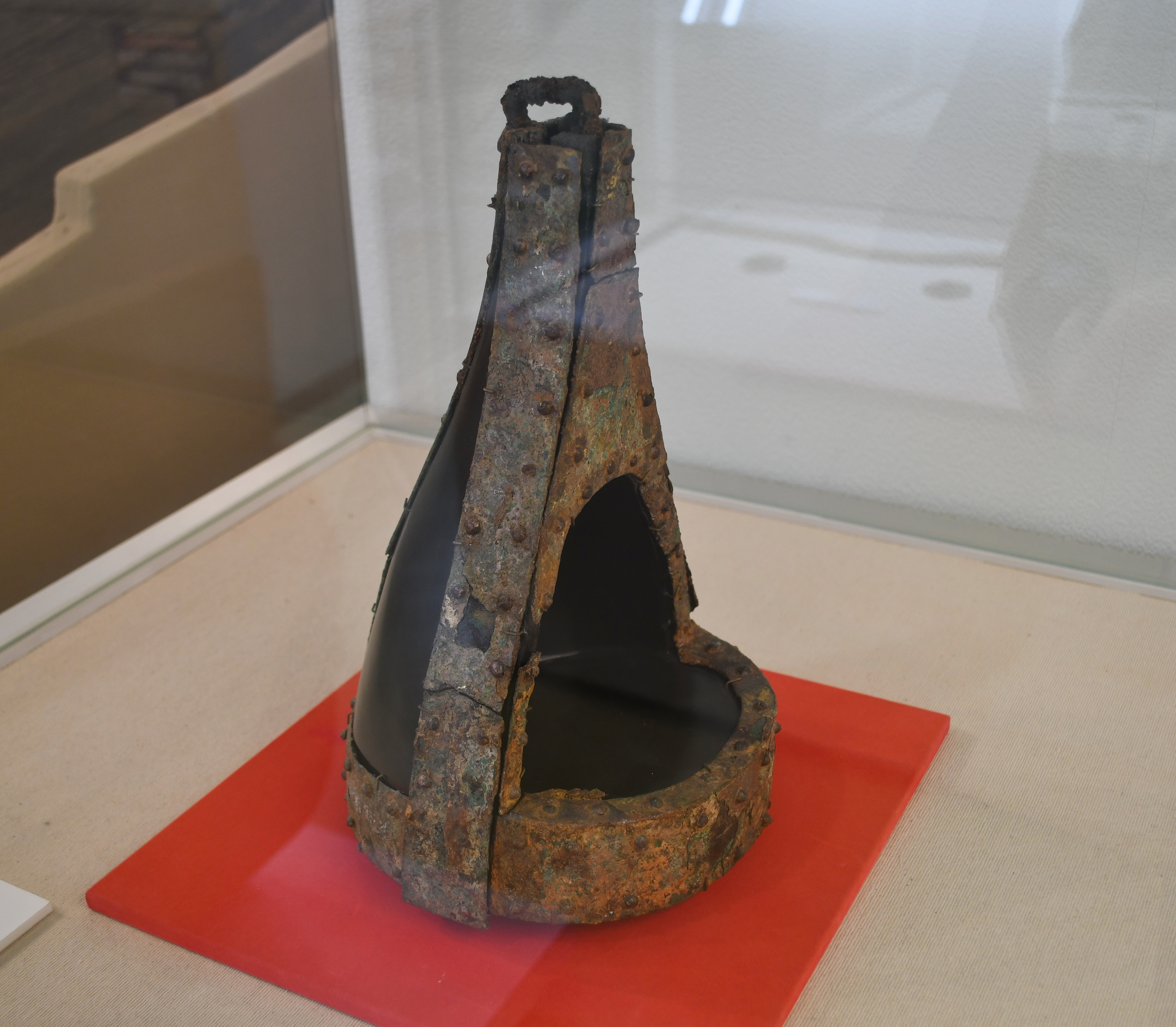
Stirrup excavated from Bakuya tumulus

== See also ==
- List of Historic Sites of Japan (Nara)
