= Unebigoryōmae Station =

Railway station in Kashihara, Nara Prefecture, Japan

Unebigoryōmae Station 畝傍御陵前駅
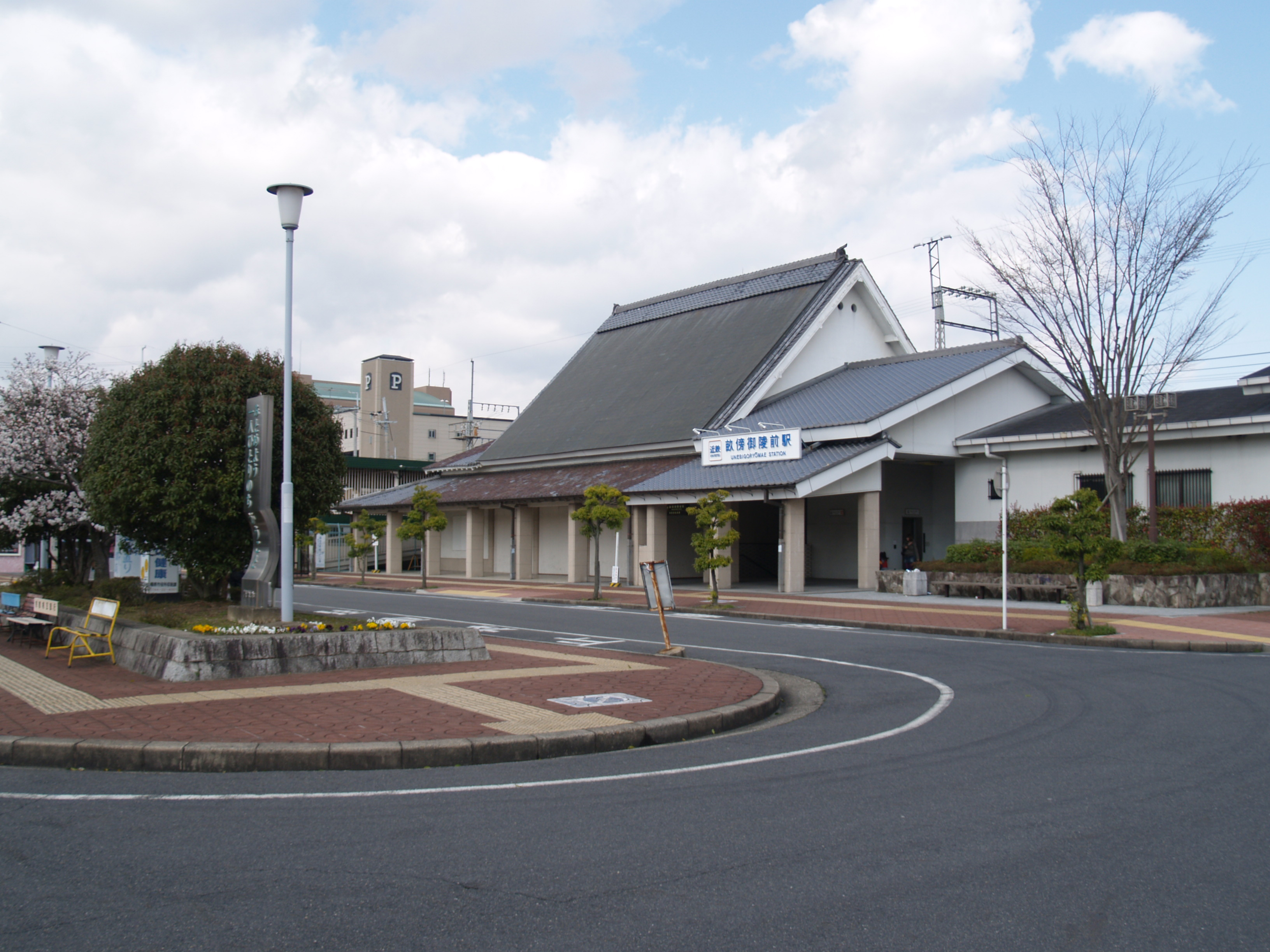
- The west entrance of Unebigoryōmae Station

General information
- Location: 455, Okubochō, Kashihara-shi, Nara-ken 634-0061; Japan
- Coordinates: 34°29′36″N 135°47′39″E
- System: Kintetsu Railway commuter rail station
- Owner: Kintetsu Railway
- Operator: Kintetsu Railway
- Line: B Kashihara Line
- Distance: 22.8 km (14.2 miles)
- Platforms: 2 side platforms
- Tracks: 2
- Train operators: Kintetsu Railway
- Connections: Nara Kotsu Bus Lines: 7・8・9・51・52・53 at Kidonoguchi

Construction
- Structure type: At grade
- Parking: None
- Cycle facilities: Available
- Accessible: Yes (2 elevators for the ticket gate and 2 for each platform)

Other information
- Station code: B42
- Website: Official website

History
- Opened: 21 March 1923
- Rebuilt: 1939 (relocated)
- Former names: Jimmugoryōmae (1937—1939); Unebiyama (1923—1937)

Passengers
- 2019: 2037
Services
Preceding station	Kintetsu Railway	Following station
B Kashihara Line
Yagi-nishiguchi towards Kyōto, Shin-Tanabe or Yamato-Saidaiji	Local	Kashiharajingū-mae Terminus
Yagi-nishiguchi towards Kyōto or Yamato-Saidaiji	Express	Kashiharajingū-mae Terminus
Location

Unebigoryōmae Station (畝傍御陵前駅, Unebigoryōmae eki) is a passenger railway station located in the city of Kashihara, Nara Prefecture, Japan. It is operated by the private transportation company, Kintetsu Railway. The station name refers to Unebi Goryō, the tomb of legendary Emperor Jimmu located about 700 meters west of the station.

== Line ==
Unebigoryōmae Station is served by the Kashihara Line and is 22.8 kilometers from the starting point of the line at Yamato-Saidaiji and 57.4 kilometers from Kyoto.

== Layout ==
The station is an above-ground station has two opposing side platforms and two tracks. The effective length of the platform is for six cars. The platforms for the up and down lines are slightly offset. The station building (ticket gates) are underground, and the platforms are above ground. There is only one ticket gate. There are entrances and exits on both the east and west sides.. The station is staffed.

== Platforms ==
1	■ B Kashihara Line	for Kashiharajingū-mae
2	■ B Kashihara Line	for Yamato Saidaiji and Kyoto

== History ==
Unebigoryōmae Station was opened 21 March 1923 as Unebiyama Station (畝火山駅) on the Osaka Electric Tramway Unebi Line. the kanji of the station name was changed to "畝傍山駅" in November 1924, and the station renamed Jinmu-Goryō-Mae Station (神武御陵前) in March 1937. The station was relocated and renamed to its present name on 28 July 1939. It became a Kansai Express Railway station due to a company merger with Sangu Express Railway on 15 March 1941, and through a subsequent merger became a station on the Kintetsu Railway on 1 July 1944.

== Passenger statistics ==
In fiscal 2019 the station was used by an average of 2037 passengers daily (boarding passengers only).

== Surrounding area ==
- National Route 169
- Mount Ameno-Kagu
- Mt. Unebi
- Kashihara Archaeological Institute, Nara prefectural (ja)
  - The Museum Kashihara Archaeological Institute, Nara prefecture
- Kashihara Park
  - Athletic Stadium
  - Baseball Stadium
- Kashihara Shrine
- Unebiyama-no Ushitora-no-sumi-no Misasagi (Unebi Goryō, tomb of Emperor Jimmu)

== See also ==
- List of railway stations in Japan
