= Kōryō, Nara =

Kōryō 広陵町
- Town
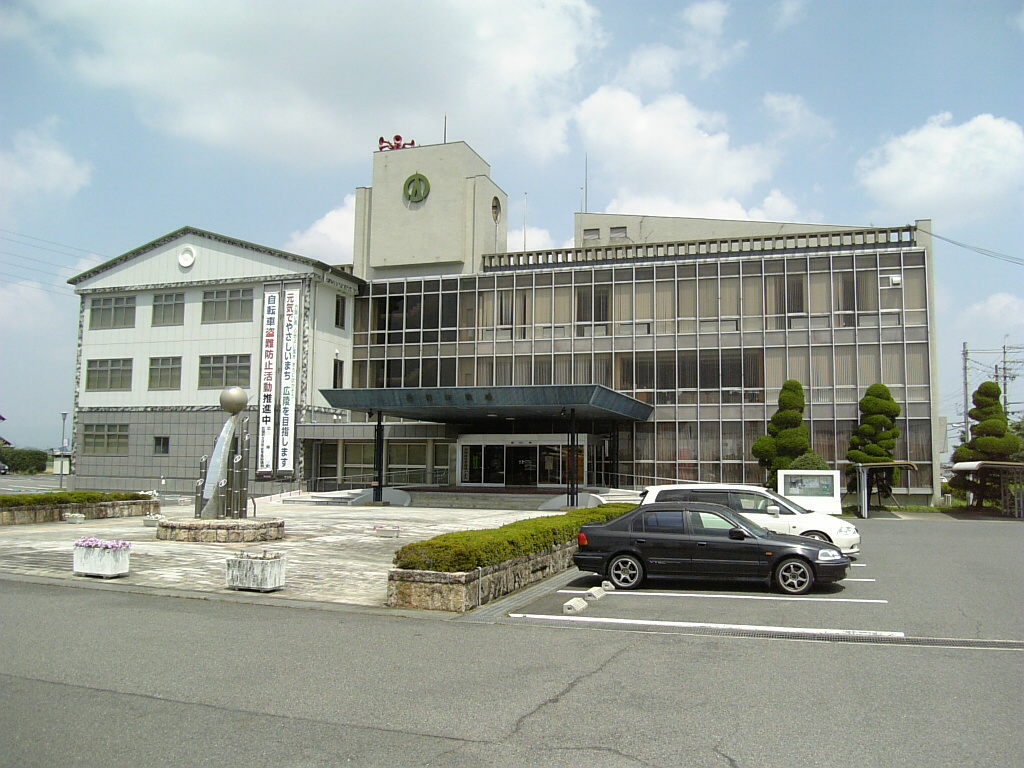
- Koryo Town Office

- Flag Emblem
- Interactive map of Kōryō
- Location in Japan
- Coordinates: 34°32′34″N 135°45′03″E
- Country: Japan
- Region: Kansai
- Prefecture: Nara
- District: Kitakatsuragi

Government
  - Mayor: Yoshiyuki Yamamura

Area
  - Total: 16.30 km^{2} (6.29 sq mi)

Population (November 30, 2024)
  - Total: 35,035
  - Density: 2,149/km^{2} (5,567/sq mi)
- Time zone: UTC+09:00 (JST)
- City hall address: 583-1 Nangō, Kōryō-chō, Kitakatsuragi-gun, Nara-ken 635-8515
- Website: Official website
- Symbols
- Flower: Sunflower
- Tree: Osmanthus fragrans

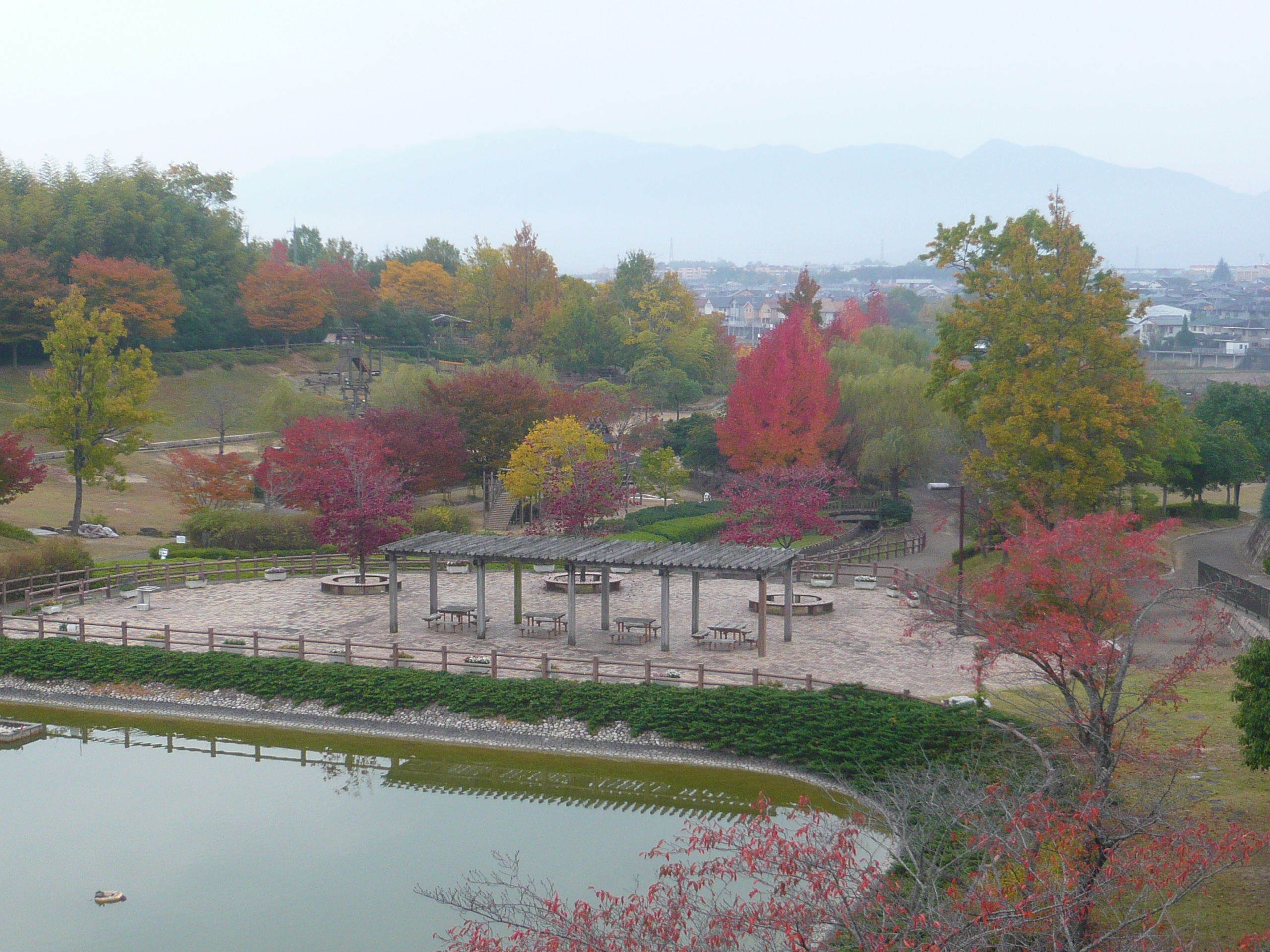
Taketori Park (竹取公園, Taketori kōen)

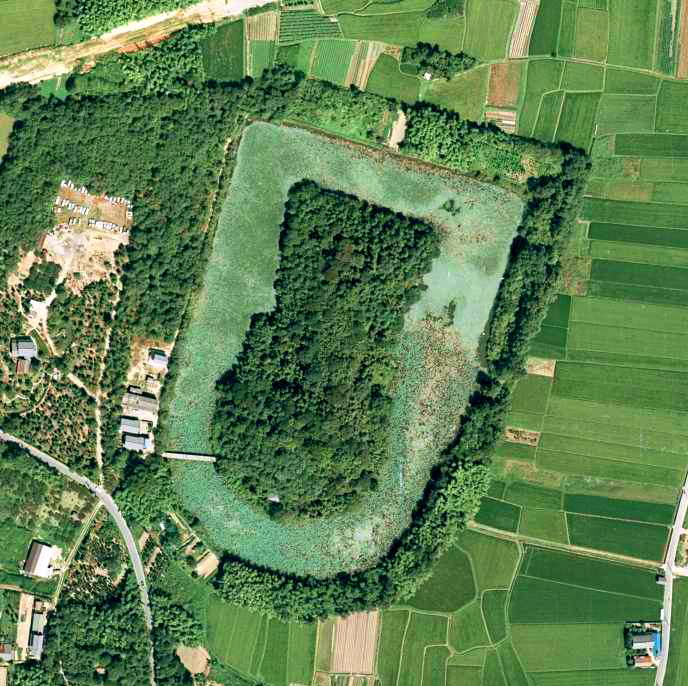
Suyama Kofun

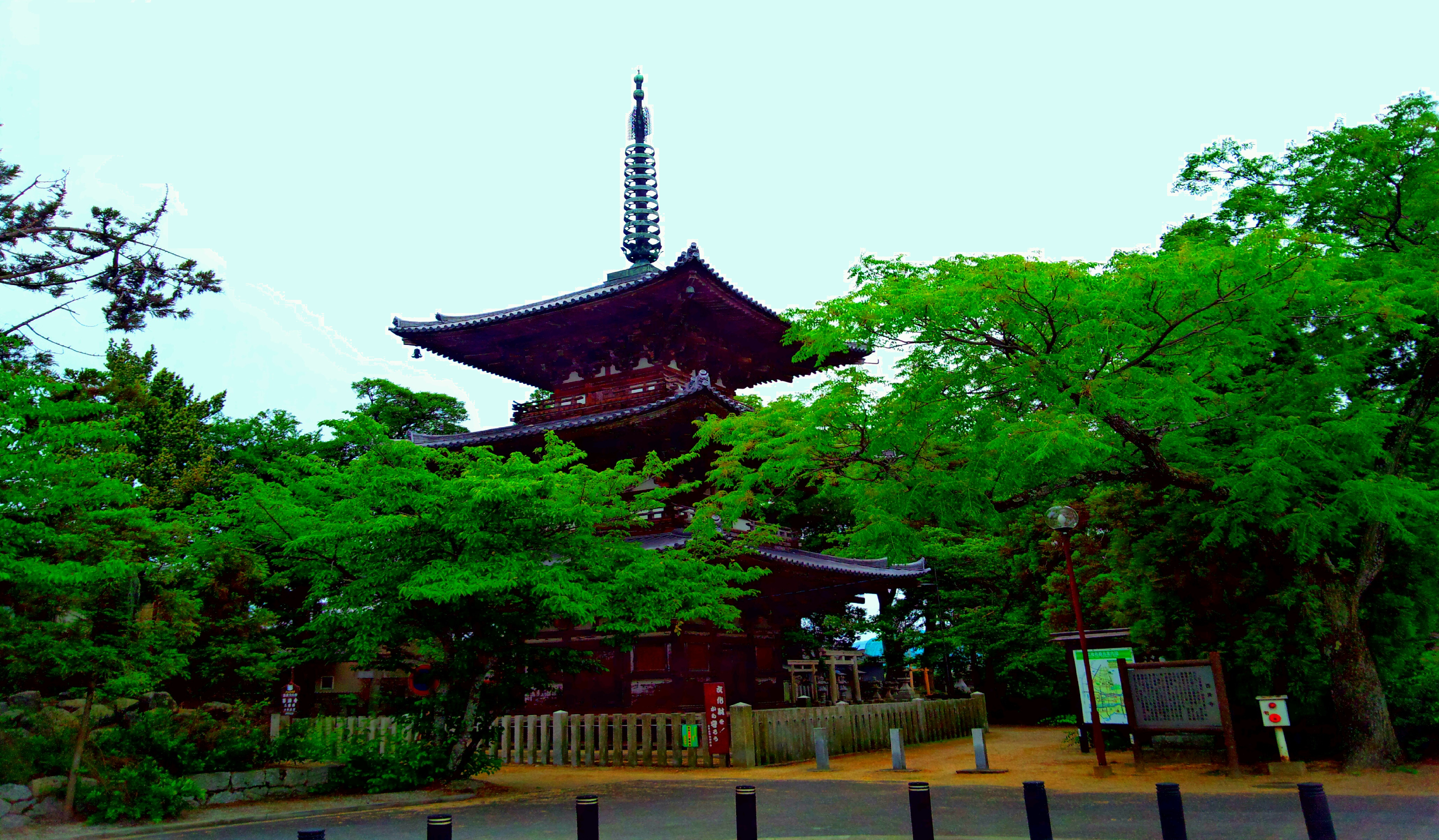
Kudara-ji (百済寺)

Kōryō (広陵町, Kōryō-chō) is a town located in Kitakatsuragi District, Nara Prefecture, Japan. As of 30 November 2024, the town had an estimated population of 35,035 in 14106 households, and a population density of 2100 persons per km^{2}. The total area of the town is 8.23 km^{2} (3.18 sq mi). Kōryō served as a temporary capital of Japan from 640 to 642 AD.

== Geography ==
Kōryō is located in the flatlands of northeast Nara Prefecture in the Nara Basin. The town has many rivers, including the Takada River and Katsuragi River, which flow north, and the Soga River, which runs along the eastern edge of the town. The eastern part of the town is flat, while the western part is hilly. Koryo has two distinct districts, Mamigaoka and Kasa. Mamigaoka is a relatively new neighborhood that houses many shops and restaurants. It is much more affluent than Kasa, which is sometimes referred to as 'Old Town'.

=== Surrounding municipalities ===
Nara Prefecture

- Kashihara
- Kanmaki
- Yamatotakada
- Kawai
- Kanmaki
- Tawaramoto
- Miyake
- Ando

=== Climate ===
Kōryō has a humid subtropical climate (Köppen Cfa) characterized by warm summers and cool winters with light to no snowfall. The average annual temperature in Kōryō is 14.2 °C. The average annual rainfall is 1636 mm with September as the wettest month. The temperatures are highest on average in August, at around 26.7 °C, and lowest in January, at around 2.8 °C.

=== Demographics ===
Per Japanese census data, the population of Kōryō is as shown below

Historical population
| Year | Pop. | ±% |
|---|---|---|
| 1960 | 15,598 | — |
| 1970 | 17,355 | +11.3% |
| 1980 | 18,427 | +6.2% |
| 1990 | 24,605 | +33.5% |
| 2000 | 31,444 | +27.8% |
| 2010 | 33,070 | +5.2% |
| 2020 | 33,810 | +2.2% |

== History ==
The area of Kōryō was part of ancient Yamato Province, and is the location of many kofun burial mounds. The Umami Kofun Group spreads out in the western part of the town. Among them, the Suyama Kofun, a Special National Historic Site, has unearthed a wooden product that appears to be a hearse used to transport the dead to the tumulus. The town is also home to Sanuki Shrine, associated with Taketori Monogatari. In the area between the Katsuragi River and the Soga River in the eastern part of the town, there was a Baekje settlement, and the three-story pagoda of Baekje Temple remains. In 640 the capital of Japan moved from Kashihara to Kōryō, with Kudara no Ohi Palace serving as the seat of power. In 642 the capital of Japan was relocated from Kōryō to Asuka. From the 11th to the 14th century, the area was a shōen landed estate controlled by the temple of Tōdai-ji.

The villages of Mami, Senan and Kudara were established on April 1, 1889 with the creation of the modern municipalities system. Mami was elevated to town status on May 1 1955. The town of Kōryō was established by the merger of Mami with Senan and Kudara on April 15, 1955. The town annexed neighboring Hashio on September 1, 1956.

=== Etymology ===
Kudara is a reference to the ancient Korean kingdom of Baekje and "Kōryō" is a reference to Korea. However, the kanji making up the town's name literally translate to 'many tombs', as the town has one of the highest concentrations of kofun in Japan.

== Government ==
Kōryō has a mayor-council form of government with a directly elected mayor and a unicameral town council of 14 members. Kōryō, collectively with the other municipalities of Kitakatsuragi District, contributes three members to the Nara Prefectural Assembly. In terms of national politics, the town is part of the Nara 2nd district of the lower house of the Diet of Japan.

== Economy ==
The local economy is based on agriculture (strawberries, eggplants) and light manufacturing. The town was traditionally known for its production of textiles, notably socks.

== Education ==
Kōryō has five public elementary schools and two public junior high school operated by the town government and one public high school operated by the Nara Prefectural Board of Education. The private Kio University and associated Kio Junior College are located in Kōryō.

== Transportation ==
=== Railways ===
Kintetsu Railway - Tawaramoto Line

Hashio

=== Highways ===
Kōryō is not on any national expressway or national highway.

== Local attractions ==
- Suyama Kofun
- Kudara-ji
- Sanuki Jinja
- Umami Kofun cluster
- Bakuya Kofun

== Notable residents ==
- Tadahiro Nomura, judoka
- Toyokazu Nomura, retired judoka
