= Kanmaki, Nara =

Town in Nara Prefecture, Japan

Kanmaki 上牧町
- Town
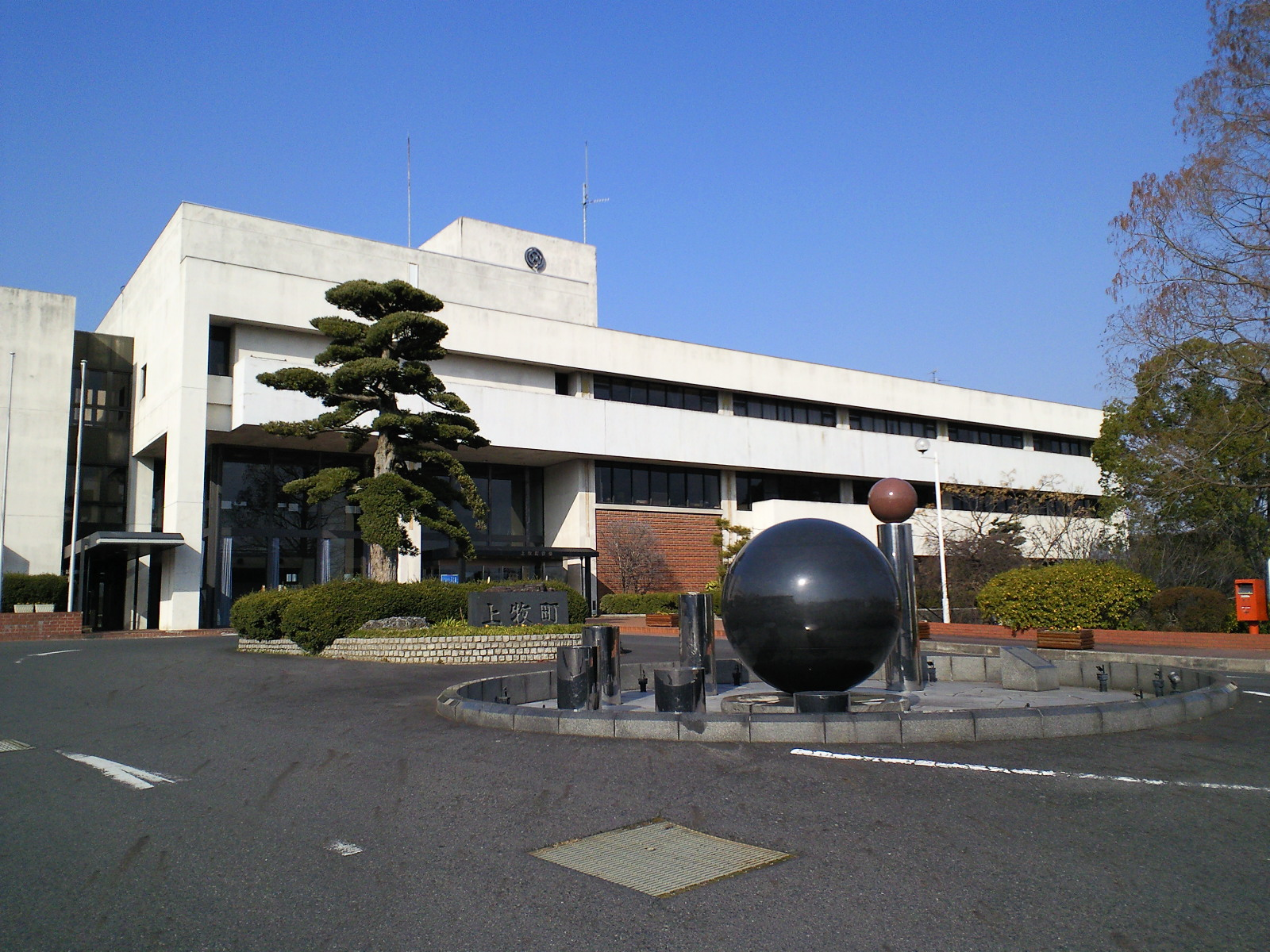
- Kanmaki Town Office

- Flag Chapter
- Interactive map of Kanmaki
- Location in Japan
- Coordinates: 34°33′46″N 135°43′00″E
- Country: Japan
- Region: Kansai
- Prefecture: Nara
- District: Kitakatsuragi

Area
  - Total: 6.14 km^{2} (2.37 sq mi)

Population (November 30, 2024)
  - Total: 21,147
  - Density: 3,440/km^{2} (8,920/sq mi)
- Time zone: UTC+09:00 (JST)
- City hall address: 3350 Kanmaki, Kanmaki-chō, Nara-ken 639-0293
- Website: Official website
- Symbols
- Flower: Lilium
- Tree: Maki

Kanmaki (上牧町, Kanmaki-chō) is a town located in Kitakatsuragi District, Nara Prefecture, Japan. As of 30 September 2024, the town had an estimated population of 21,147 in 10075 households, and a population density of 3400 persons per km^{2}. The total area of the city is 6.14 km^{2} (2.37 sq mi).

== Geography ==
Kanmaki is located in the western part of the Nara Basin, almost in the center of the Umami Hills. It is about 20 kilometers northeast of Nara City and about 25 kilometers from Osaka.

=== Surrounding municipalities ===
Nara Prefecture

- Kashiba
- Ōji
- Kawai
- Kōryō

=== Climate ===
Kanmaki has a humid subtropical climate (Köppen Cfa) characterized by warm summers and cool winters with light to no snowfall. The average annual temperature in Kanmaki is 14.6 °C. The average annual rainfall is 1636 mm with September as the wettest month. The temperatures are highest on average in August, at around 26.7 °C, and lowest in January, at around 3.1 °C.

=== Demographics ===
Per Japanese census data, the population of Kanmaki is as shown below

Historical population
Year	Pop.	±%
1940	3,331	—
1950	4,331	+30.0%
1960	4,134	−4.5%
1970	4,483	+8.4%
1980	16,452	+267.0%
1990	21,336	+29.7%
2000	24,005	+12.5%
2010	23,728	−1.2%
2020	21,714	−8.5%

== History ==
The area of Kanmaki was part of ancient Yamato Province. During most of the Edo period, it was part of the holdings of Kōriyama Domain, and was a river port with connections to Osaka and was noted for footwear production. The village of Kanmaki was established on April 1, 1889, with the creation of the modern municipalities system. It was elevated to town status on December 1, 1972.

== Government ==
Kanmaki has a mayor-council form of government with a directly elected mayor and a unicameral town council of 12 members. Kamanmaki, collectively with the other municipalities of Kitakatsuragi District, contributes three members to the Nara Prefectural Assembly. In terms of national politics, the town is part of the Nara 2nd district of the lower house of the Diet of Japan.

== Economy ==
The local economy is based on agriculture and light manufacturing; however, with new town developments starting in the 1960s, and with the opening of the Nishi-Meihan Expressway, the town is now largely a commuter town for the greater Osaka metropolis.

== Education ==
Kanmaki has three public elementary schools and two public junior high school operated by the town government and one public high school operated by the Nara Prefectural Board of Education. The prefecture also operates a special education school for the handicapped.

== Transportation ==
=== Railways ===
Kanmaki does not have any passenger railway services. The nearest train station is Shizumi Station on the JR West Wakayama Line.

=== Highways ===
- Nishi-Meihan Expressway
