= Suyama Kofun =

Kofun period burial mound in Japan

- 巣山古墳 (Japanese)
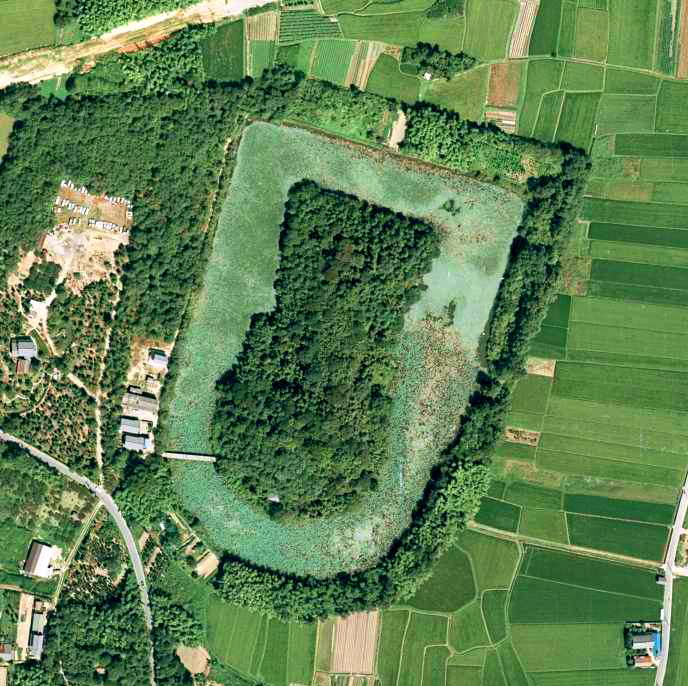
- Suyama Kofun

- Suyama Kofun Suyama Kofun (Japan)
- Interactive map of Suyama Kofun
- 34°33′23″N 135°44′27″E
- Type: Kofun
- Periods: Kofun period
- Location: Kōryō, Nara, Japan
- Region: Kansai region

History
- Built: c.4th - 5th century

Site notes
- Public access: Yes (no facilities)

Suyama Kofun (巣山古墳) is a burial mound from the Kofun period, located on the border of the Miyoshi neighborhood of the town of Kōryō, Nara Prefecture in the Kansai region of Japan. It is designated as a national Special Historic Site. The tumulus was designated a National Historic Site of Japan in 1927, with its status elevated to that of a Special National Historic Site in 1952. It the central tumulus of the burial mounds that make up the Umami Kofun cluster and is estimated to have been built between the end of the 4th century and the beginning of the 5th century.

== Overview ==
The Suyama Kofun is a zenpō-kōen-fun (前方後円墳), which is shaped like a keyhole, having one square end and one circular end, when viewed from above. It is facing north, but its central axis faces slightly northeast. A wide moat surrounds the mound, which is completely filled with water. The mound is built of earth in three tiers, and the slope of each tier steeper than the one before it. The slopes are covered with fukiishi consisting of andesite-based gravel and broken stones. Traces of rows of cylindrical haniwa clay figures have been found. Square projections are attached to the narrow part connecting the anterior and posterior sections. The total length of the tumulus is 202 meters, making it one of a small handful of kofun tombs over 200 meters in length which were not administered by the Imperial Household Agency. Subsequent archaeological excavations evealed a base stone 8 meters wide outside the base of the mound, revising its total length to 220 meters. The posterior circular mound has a diameter of 130 meters, and height of 25 meters; the anterior rectangular portion has a width of 112 meters, and height of 21 meters. The top of the circular mound is flat with a diameter of 45 meters. The moat is shield-shaped, and the width is 33 meters at the circular mound side, 37 meters at the front, and 57 meters around the narrow part. The outer bank of the moat is 27 meters wide at its widest point, and is built on parts of the south, east, and north sides, and is particularly high and wide on the east and northeast sides. Two pit-style stone burial chambers parallel to the main axis of the circular mound were excavated in the circular section, but they were looted during the Meiji period, and most of the many grave goods are now lost.

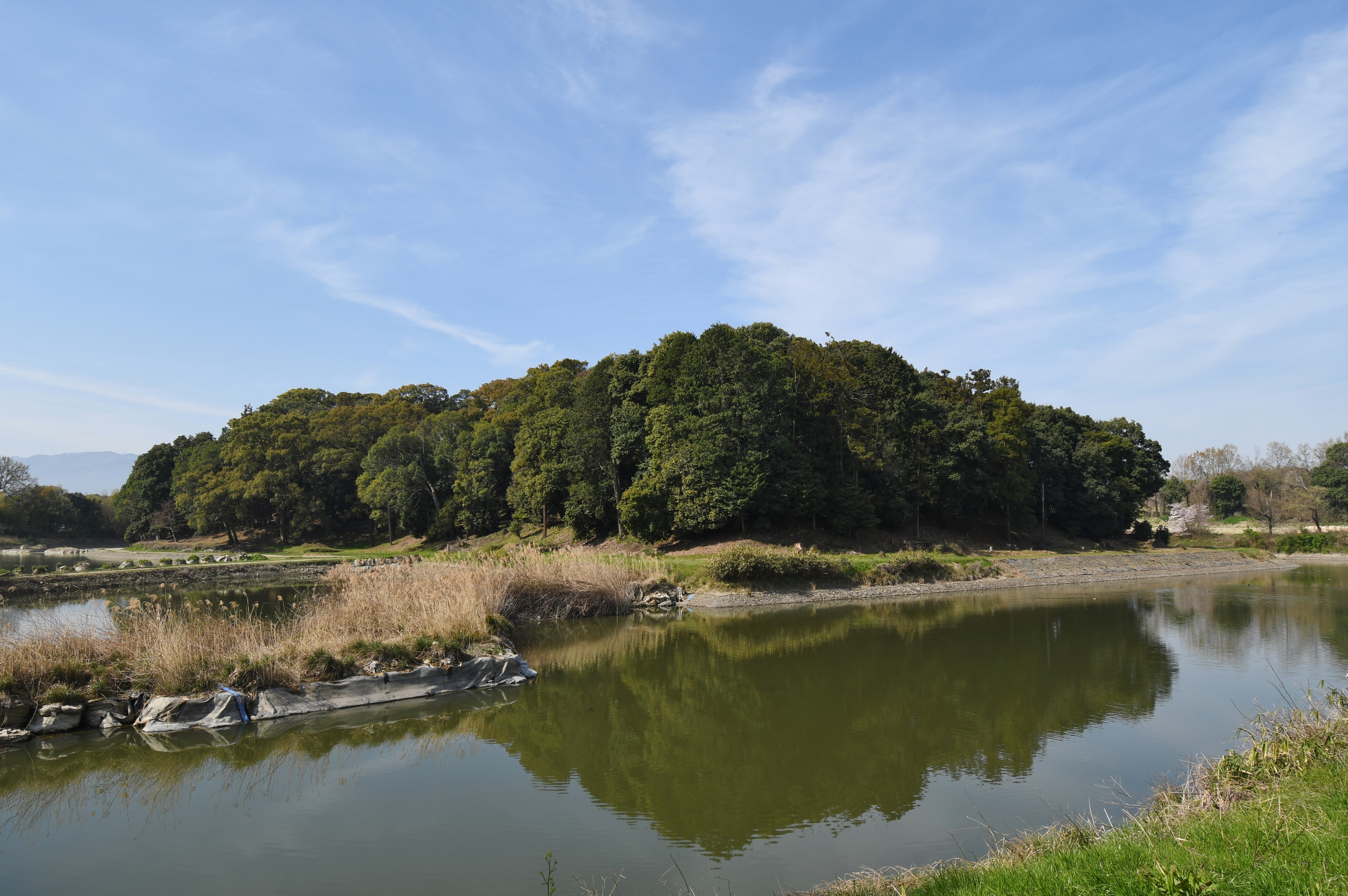
Suyama Kofun

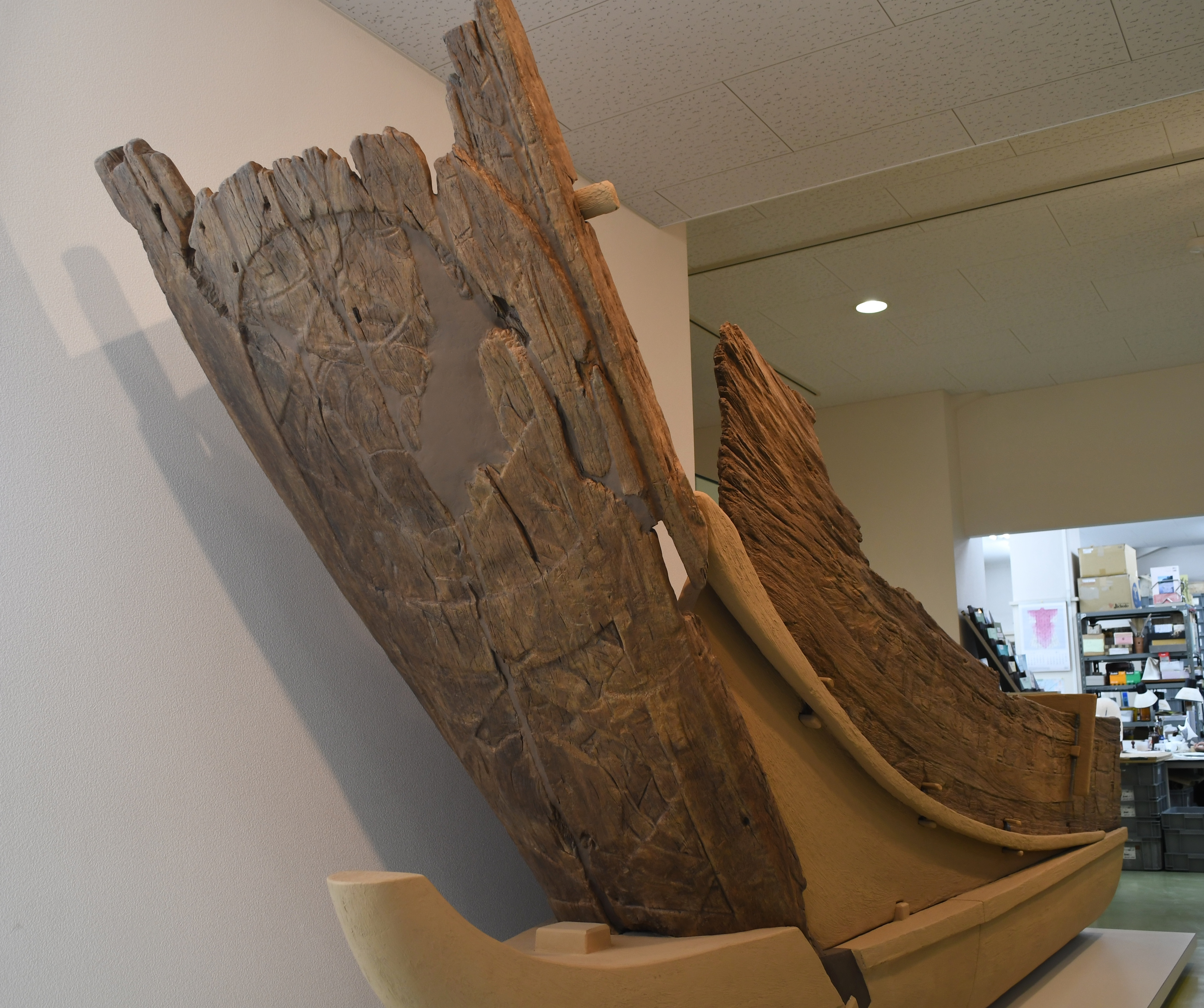
Mourning ship excavated from Suyama Tomb

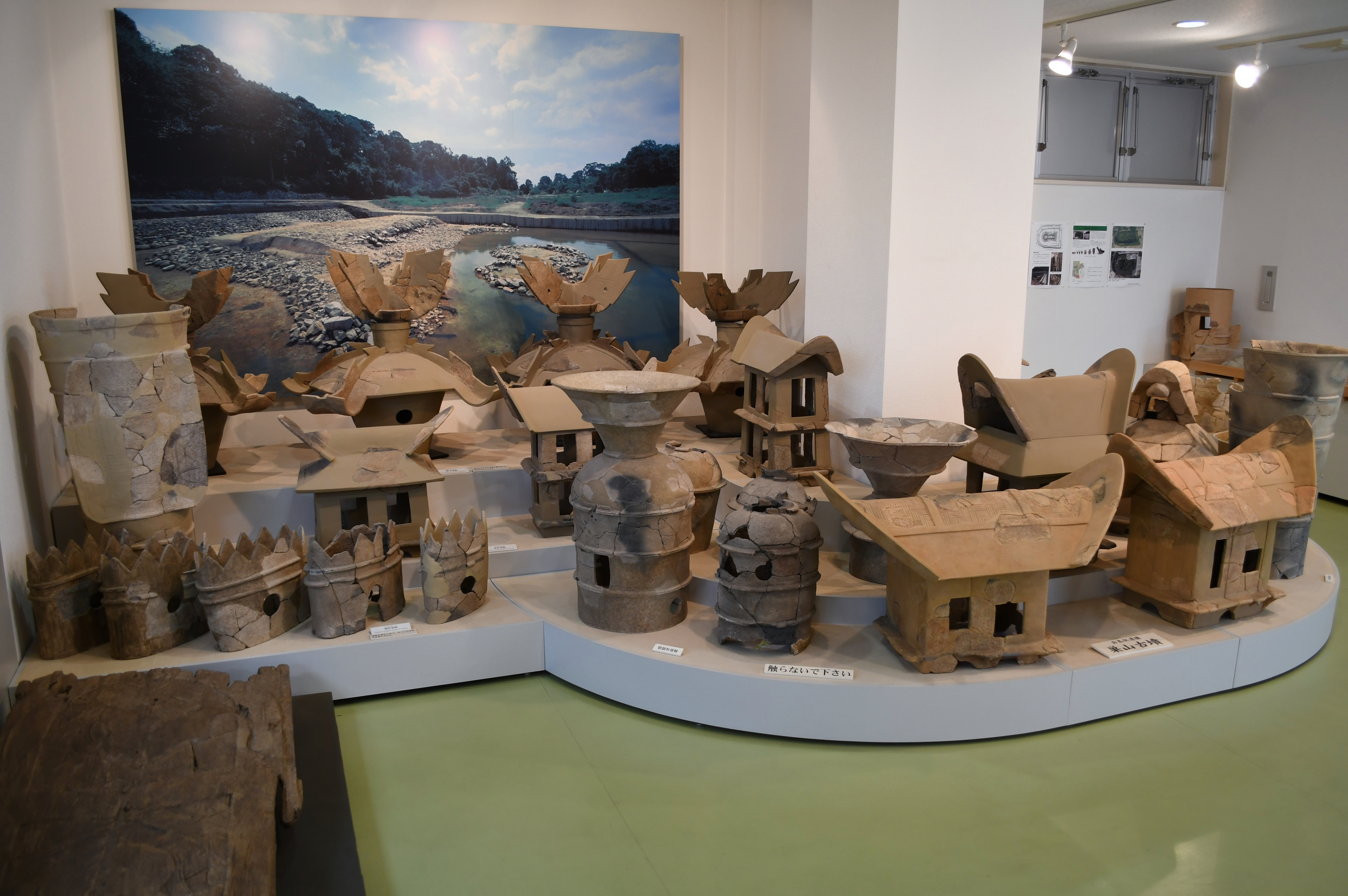
Group of excavated haniwa

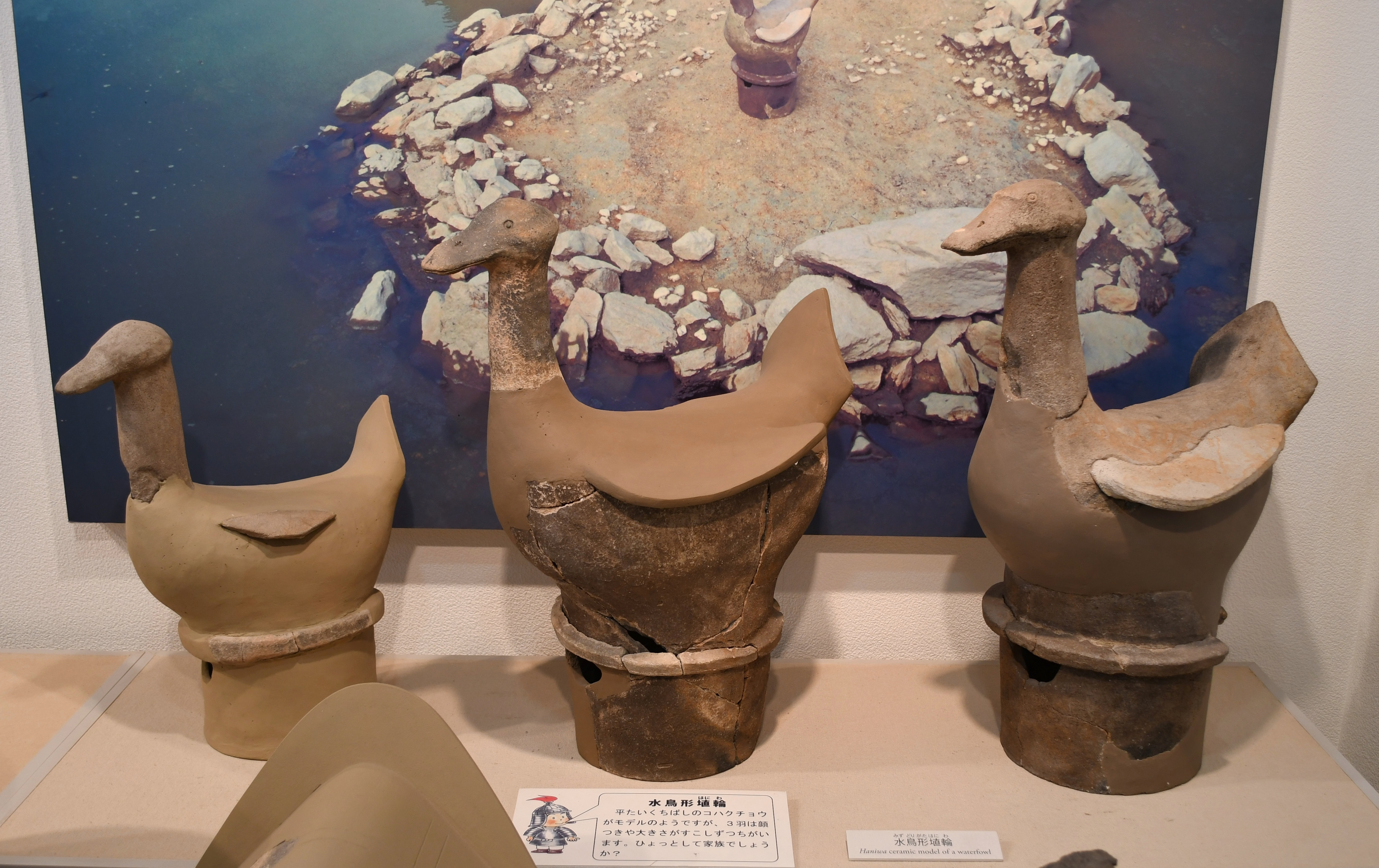
waterfowl-shaped haniwa

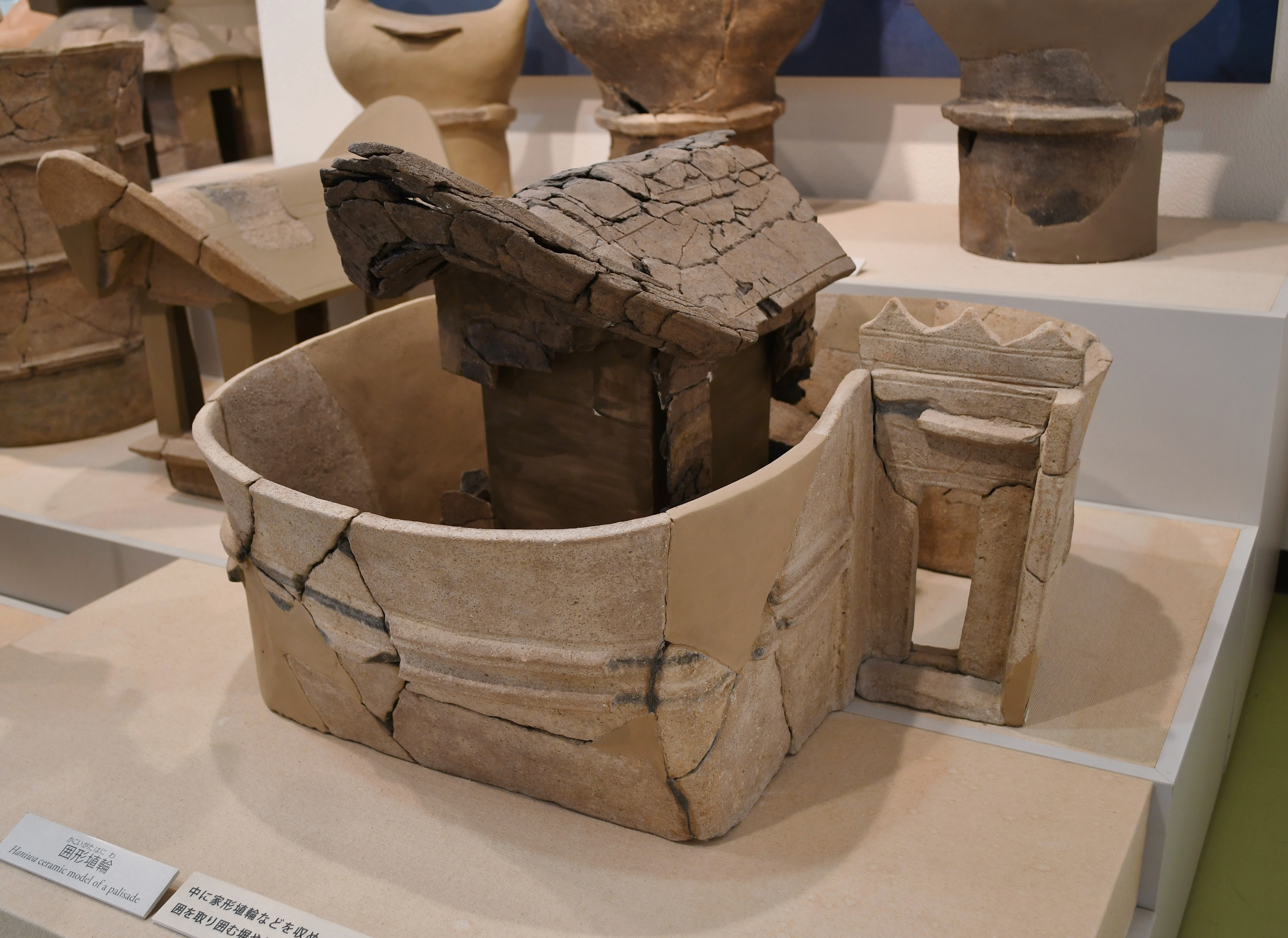
Enclosure-shaped haniwa

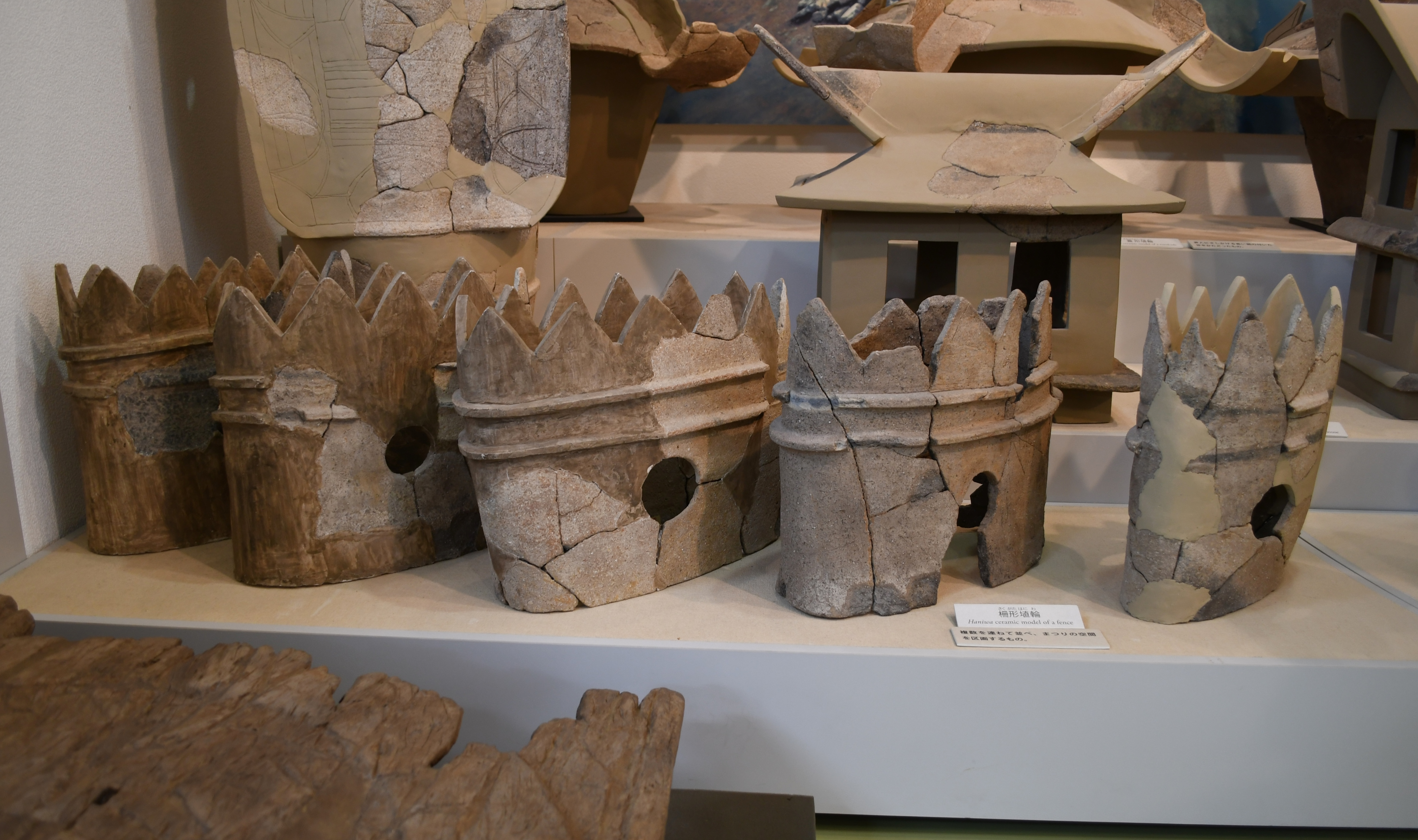
Fence-shaped haniwa

The Suyama Kofun is approximately four kilometers southwest of Hashio Station on the Kintetsu Railway Tawaramoto Line.

== See also ==
- List of Historic Sites of Japan (Nara)
