= Yagi-nishiguchi Station =

Railway station in Kashihara, Nara Prefecture, Japan

Yagi-nishiguchi Station 八木西口駅
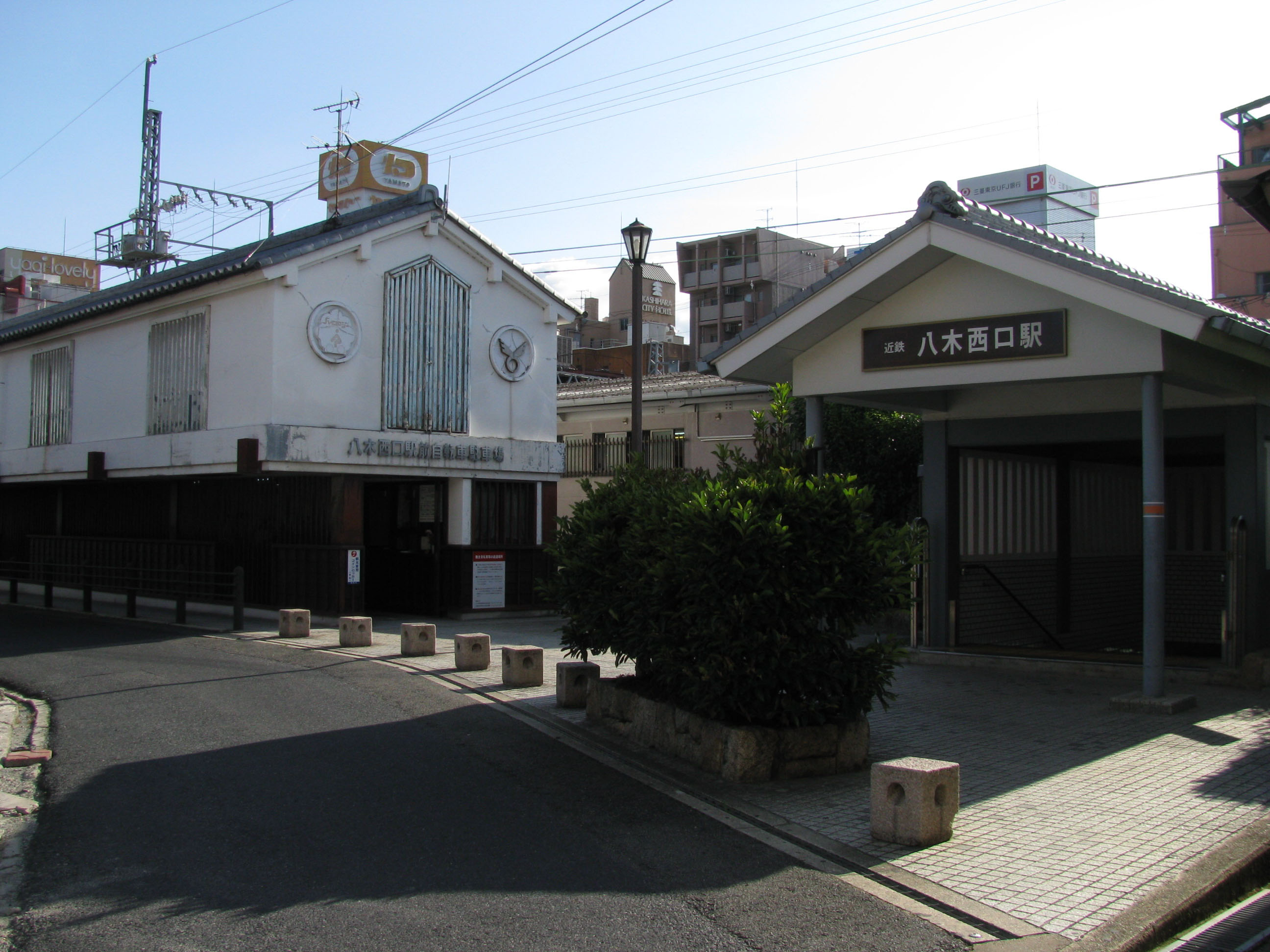
- The station building of Yagi-nishiguchi Station

General information
- Location: 18-32, Yagichō 1-chōme, Kashihara; Nara: Japan; （奈良県橿原市八木町一丁目8-32）
- Coordinates: 34°30′33″N 135°47′27″E
- System: Kintetsu Railway commuter rail station
- Owner: Kintetsu Railway
- Operator: Kintetsu Railway
- Line: B Kashihara Line
- Distance: 20.5 km (12.7 miles)
- Platforms: 2 side platforms
- Tracks: 2
- Train operators: Kintetsu Railway
- Connections: None

Construction
- Structure type: At grade
- Parking: None
- Cycle facilities: Available
- Accessible: Yes (2 elevators for the ticket gate and 2 for each platform)

Other information
- Station code: B40
- Website: Official website

History
- Opened: 21 March 1923
- Former names: Daiki Yagi (1928—1929); Yagi (1923—1928)
Services
Preceding station	Kintetsu Railway	Following station
B Kashihara Line
Yamato-Yagi towards Kyōto, Shin-Tanabe or Yamato-Saidaiji	Local	Unebigoryōmae towards Kashiharajingū-mae
Yamato-Yagi towards Kyōto or Yamato-Saidaiji	Express	Unebigoryōmae towards Kashiharajingū-mae
Location

Yagi-nishiguchi Station (八木西口駅, Yagi-nishiguchi-eki) is a railway station on the Kintetsu Kashihara Line, located in Kashihara, Nara, Japan. It is a typical small station, but has a unique status as a non-independent station. For a historical reason, the station is a part of Yamato-Yagi Station, a large intersection station located about 300 meters north of the station.

== History ==
The station is the original site of Yamato-Yagi Station which opened here in 1923 and moved to the present location in 1929 when the railway company did not remove the original platforms of the station and continued the service with the old facilities as well as the new Yamato-Yagi Station. Yagi-nishiguchi Station is therefore treated as the same station as Yamato-Yagi Station on some occasions, such as the calculation of distance-based fares. However, travel between Yagi-nishiguchi Station and Yamato-Yagi Station costs 150 yen, even though it is a mere move within the station, and walking the distance will take no longer than 5 minutes.

== Lines ==
- Kintetsu Railway
  - B Kashihara Line

== Platforms and tracks ==
1	■ Kashihara Line	for Kashihara-Jingumae
2	■ Kashihara Line	for Yamato-Yagi Yamato-Saidaiji and Kyoto
