= Miminashi Station =

Railway station in Kashihara, Nara Prefecture, Japan

Miminashi Station 耳成駅
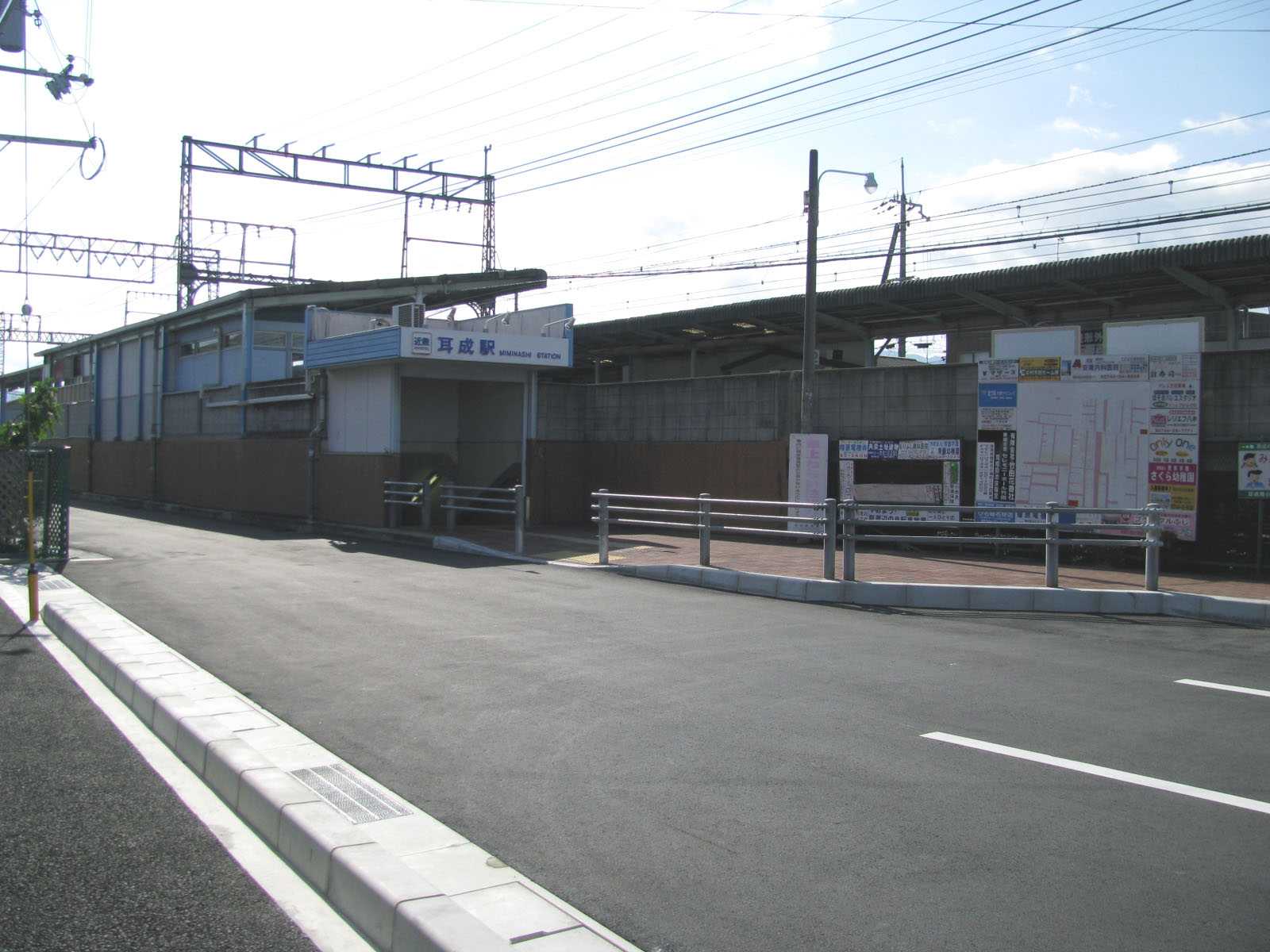
- Miminashi Statio

General information
- Location: 208-2 Ishiharadacho, Kashihara-shi, Nara-ken 634-0014; Japan
- Coordinates: 34°30′44.3″N 135°48′53.48″E
- System: Kintetsu Railway commuter rail station
- Owner: Kintetsu Railway
- Operator: Kintetsu Railway
- Line: D Osaka Line
- Distance: 26.9 km (16.7 miles) from Osaka Uehommachi
- Platforms: 2 side platforms
- Tracks: 2
- Train operators: Kintetsu Railway
- Connections: Bus terminal

Construction
- Cycle facilities: Available
- Accessible: Yes

Other information
- Station code: D40
- Website: www.kintetsu.co.jp/station/station_info/station02031.html

History
- Opened: 5 January 1929

Passengers
- FY2019: 2032 daily

Services
Preceding station	Kintetsu Railway	Following station
Yamato-Yagi towards Osaka Uehommachi	Osaka Line Local Semi-Express	Daifuku towards Ise-Nakagawa
Location

Miminashi Station (耳成駅, Miminashi-eki) is a passenger railway station located in the city of Kashihara, Nara Prefecture, Japan. It is operated by the private transportation company, Kintetsu Railway.

== Line ==
Miminashi Station is served by the Osaka Line and is 36.9 kilometers from the starting point of the line at Ōsaka Uehommachi.

== Layout ==
The station is an above-ground station with two opposed side platforms and two tracks. The ticket gates and concourse are underground, and the platform is above ground. The effective length of the platform is six cars. There is one ticket gate and one entrance/exit on both the north and south sides. The station is staffed.

== Platforms ==
1	■ D Osaka Line	for Nabari
2	■ D Osaka Line	for Osaka Uehommachi

== History ==
Miminashi Station was opened 5 January 1929 as a station on the Osaka Electric Tramway Sakurai Line. It became a Kansai Express Railway station due to a company merger with Sangu Express Railway on 15 March 1941, and through a subsequent merger became a station on the Kintetsu Railway on 1 July 1944.

== Passenger statistics ==
In fiscal 2019 the station was used by an average of 2032 passengers daily (boarding passengers only).

== Surrounding area ==
The station is located in a residential area, with apartments and condominiums scattered here and there. Shops are also scattered within this residential area. Japan National Route 169 and the Sakurai Line (Manyo Mahoroba Line) pass a little distance south of the station. Kindergartens and nursery schools are located on the north side of the station, and Mount Miminashi is on the west side of the station.

== See also ==
- List of railway stations in Japan
