= Yamatotakada =

Yamatotakada 大和高田市
- City
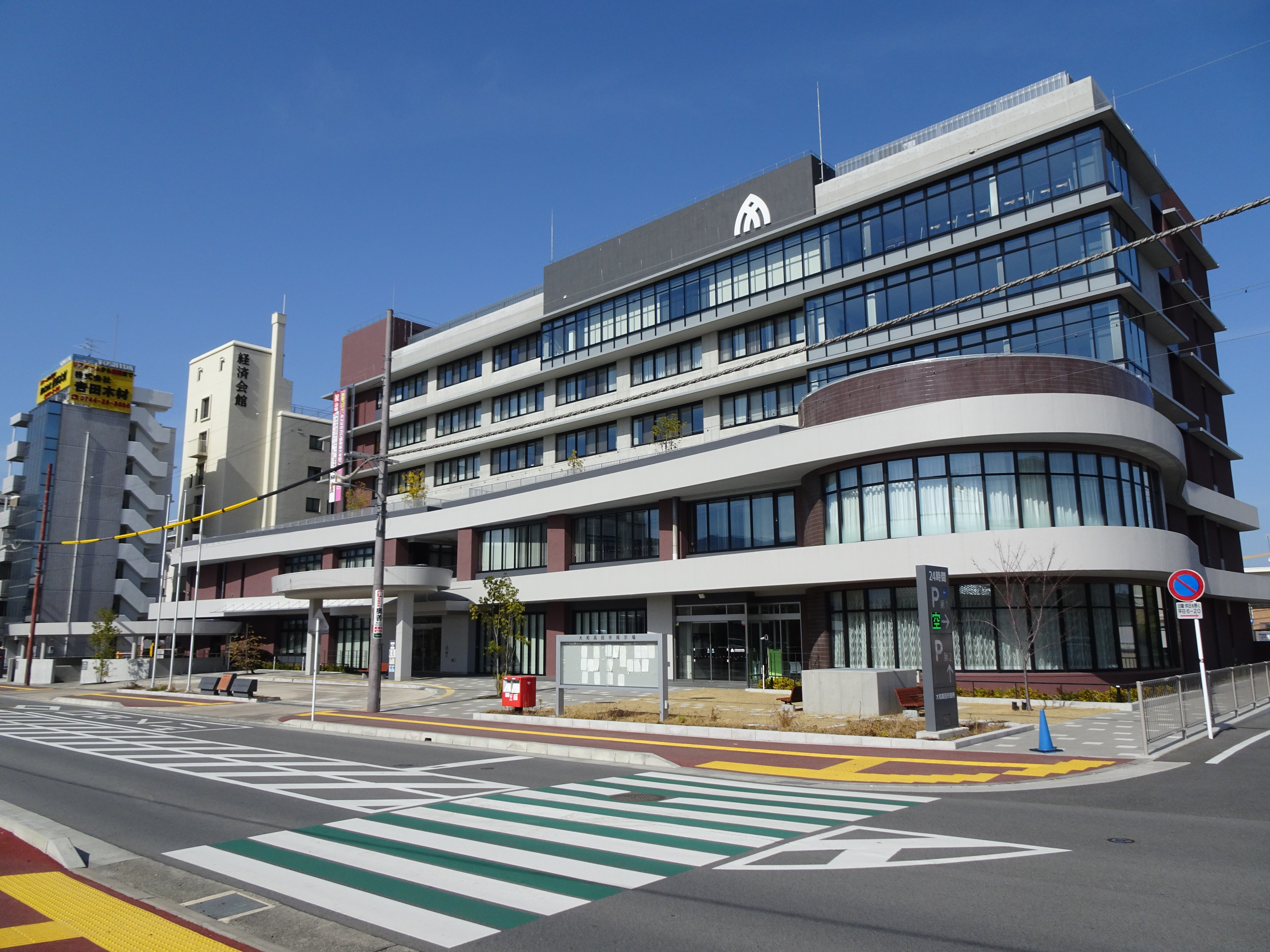
- Yamatotakada City Hall

- Flag Emblem
- /0/queryThe property query is required; /0/idsThe property ids is required; /0Failed to match at least one schema; /0/titleThe property title is required; /0/serviceDoes not have a value in the enumeration ["page"]; /0Failed to match exactly one schema; /0/geometriesThe property geometries is required; /0/typeDoes not have a value in the enumeration ["GeometryCollection"]; /0/typeDoes not have a value in the enumeration ["MultiPolygon"]; /0/typeDoes not have a value in the enumeration ["Point"]; /0/typeDoes not have a value in the enumeration ["MultiPoint"]; /0/typeDoes not have a value in the enumeration ["LineString"]; /0/typeDoes not have a value in the enumeration ["MultiLineString"]; /0/typeDoes not have a value in the enumeration ["Polygon"]; /0/coordinatesThe property coordinates is required; /0/geometryThe property geometry is required; /0/typeDoes not have a value in the enumeration ["Feature"]; /0/featuresThe property features is required; /0/typeDoes not have a value in the enumeration ["FeatureCollection"]; Location of Yamatotakada in Nara Prefecture

- Location in Japan
- Coordinates: 34°30′54″N 135°44′11″E
- Country: Japan
- Region: Kansai
- Prefecture: Nara

Government
  - Mayor: Masakatsu Yoshida

Area
  - Total: 16.48 km^{2} (6.36 sq mi)

Population (October 1, 2024)
  - Total: 61,950
  - Density: 3,759/km^{2} (9,736/sq mi)
- Time zone: UTC+09:00 (JST)
- City hall address: 101-1 Ōaza Ōnaka, Yamatotakada-shi, Nara-ken 635-8511
- Website: Official website
- Symbols
- Bird: None
- Flower: Cosmos
- Tree: Camellia sasanqua

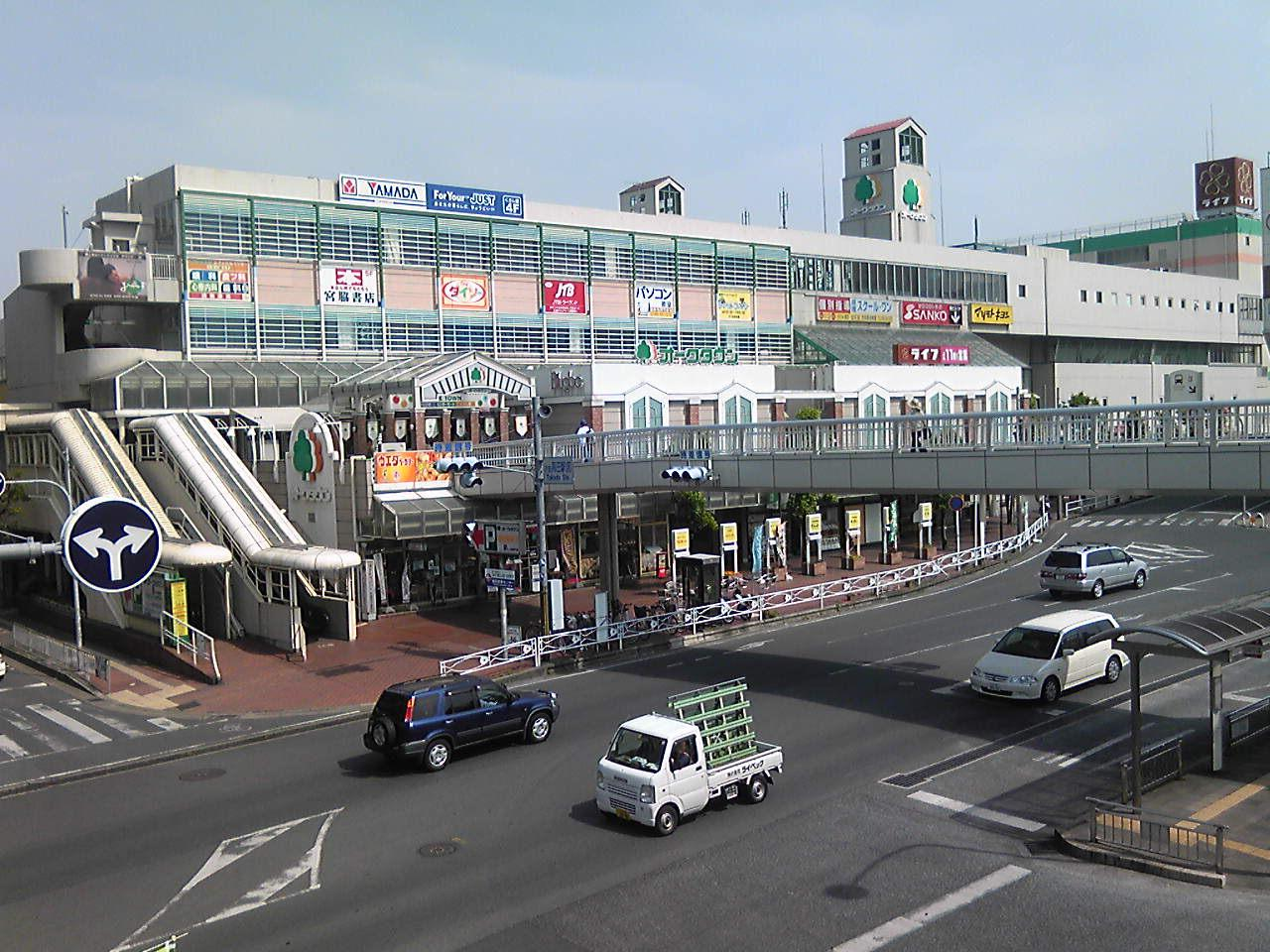
Unitika oaktown yamatotakada

Yamatotakada (大和高田市, Yamatotakada-shi) is a city located in Nara Prefecture, Japan. As of 31 August 2024, the city had an estimated population of 61,950 in 31312 households, and a population density of 3800 persons per km^{2}. The total area of the city is 16.48 km^{2} (6.36 sq mi).

== Geography ==
Occupying a corner of the central-western part of the Nara Basin, most of the small city area is flat, with the northwestern part of the city forming the southern end of the Umami Hills. The Katsuragi River and the Takada River run through the city from north-to-south. The Soga River runs through the northeastern part of the city, near the border with Kashihara, and the Kuzugawa River runs through the northwestern part. The Takada River once ran east of its current course, but because it was plagued by flooding, rerouting work began in 1932, resulting in its current course. The old course was filled in and turned into a road, which became the current Japan National Route 166 and Nara Prefectural Route Yamato-Takada-Ikaruga Line, and traces of it remain in the place names along the road and relics such as bridge railings. In recent years, the use of farmland and reservoirs for housing has eliminated flood storage areas during heavy rains, and some parts of the city suffer from flooding above and below the floor level during heavy rains.

=== Neighboring municipalities ===
Nara Prefecture

- Gose
- Kashiba
- Kashihara
- Katsuragi
- Kōryō

=== Climate ===
Yamatotakada has a humid subtropical climate (Köppen Cfa) characterized by warm summers and cool winters with light to no snowfall. The average annual temperature in Yamatotakada is 14.2 °C. The average annual rainfall is 1636 mm with September as the wettest month. The temperatures are highest on average in August, at around 26.4 °C, and lowest in January, at around 2.7 °C.

=== Demographics ===
Per Japanese census data, the population of Yamatotakada is as shown below

Historical population
Year	Pop.	±%
1960	41,705	—
1970	53,475	+28.2%
1980	61,711	+15.4%
1990	68,237	+10.6%
2000	73,668	+8.0%
2010	68,451	−7.1%
2020	61,744	−9.8%

== History ==
The area of Yamatotakada was part of ancient Yamato Province. Inhabited since the Japanese Paleolithic, the city area nurtured paddy field agriculture in the fertile Nara Basin since ancient times. Numerous large keyhole-type burial mounds (kofun) were constructed in the northwestern part of the city around the 5th century. During the Sengoku period Takada Castle was constructed by the local Takada clan near the site of the current Katashio Elementary School, and the area developed as a castle town. During the Edo Period, it developed into a market town centered around cotton cultivation, which led to the development of spinning and textile industries after the Meiji restoration. The town of Takada was established on April 1, 1889 with the creation of the modern municipalities system. It was elevated to city status on January 1, 1948, and at that time was renamed Yamatotakada (by prepending the former provincial name "Yamato") to avoid duplication with Takada City in Niigata Prefecture (which itself was subsequently renamed). Presently, three other cities in Japan also contain the same two characters that make up "Takada" (高田): Rikuzentakata City in Iwate Prefecture, Akitakata City in Hiroshima Prefecture, and Bungotakada City in Oita Prefecture.

Toshiharu Matsuda, who served as mayor of the city since 1992, resigned in 2003. During his terms of office he executed ambitious construction plans resulting in burdensome debt. He was also criticized for his connection with a gangster boss in the city of Nara. Masakatsu Yoshida, elected as new major in April 2003, has had to cope with the deteriorating financial problems combined with a curtailed national subsidy and mounting unpaid city tax.

== Government ==
Yamatotakada has a mayor-council form of government with a directly elected mayor and a unicameral city council of 17 members. Yamatotakada contributes three members to the Nara Prefectural Assembly. In terms of national politics, the city is part of the Nara 3rd district of the lower house of the Diet of Japan.

== Economy ==
The city continues to develop as a local business and government center in the center of Nara Prefecture. The Yamatotakada area is a center for light manufacturing. Traditionally, the area is noted for the textile and hosiery industries.

== Education ==
Yamatotakada has eight public elementary schools, three public junior high schools, one public high school and one vocational training school operated by the city government and two public high schools operated by the Nara Prefectural Board of Education. There are also two private high schools and one private vocational training school.

- Primary schools
  - Iwasono Elementary School
  - Katashio Elementary School
  - Ukiana Elementary School
  - Takada Elementary School
  - Ukiananishi Elementary School
- Junior high schools
  - Katashio Junior High School
  - Takada Junior High School
  - Takadanishi Junior High School
- High schools
  - Japan Aviation High School
  - Nara Culture High School
  - Takada Commerce High School
  - Takada High School
  - Takadahigashi High School
- Other
  - Yamatotakada Municipal Nursing School
  - Bigei Gakuen Vocational School

== Transportation ==
=== Railways ===
JR West - Sakurai Line (Manyō-Mahoroba Line)

U Takada

Kintetsu Railway - Osaka Line

Tsukiyama - Yamato-Takada - Matsuzuka

Kintetsu Railway - Minami Osaka Line

Takadashi - Ukiana

=== Highways ===
- Keinawa Expressway
- National Route 24
- National Route 165
- National Route 166
- National Route 168

== Sister cities ==
- Lismore, Australia, from 1963, through the arrangement of an Australian Catholic father (Paul Glynn), a sister-city relationship with Lismore, New South Wales, Australia. It is known as the first such relationship between the two countries.

== Notable people from Yamatotakada ==
- Thelma Aoyama, musician
- Hirofumi Itō, shogi player
- Ai Kago, actress and singer
