= Kio University =

Coordinates: 34°32′48″N 135°43′24″E

- 畿央大学
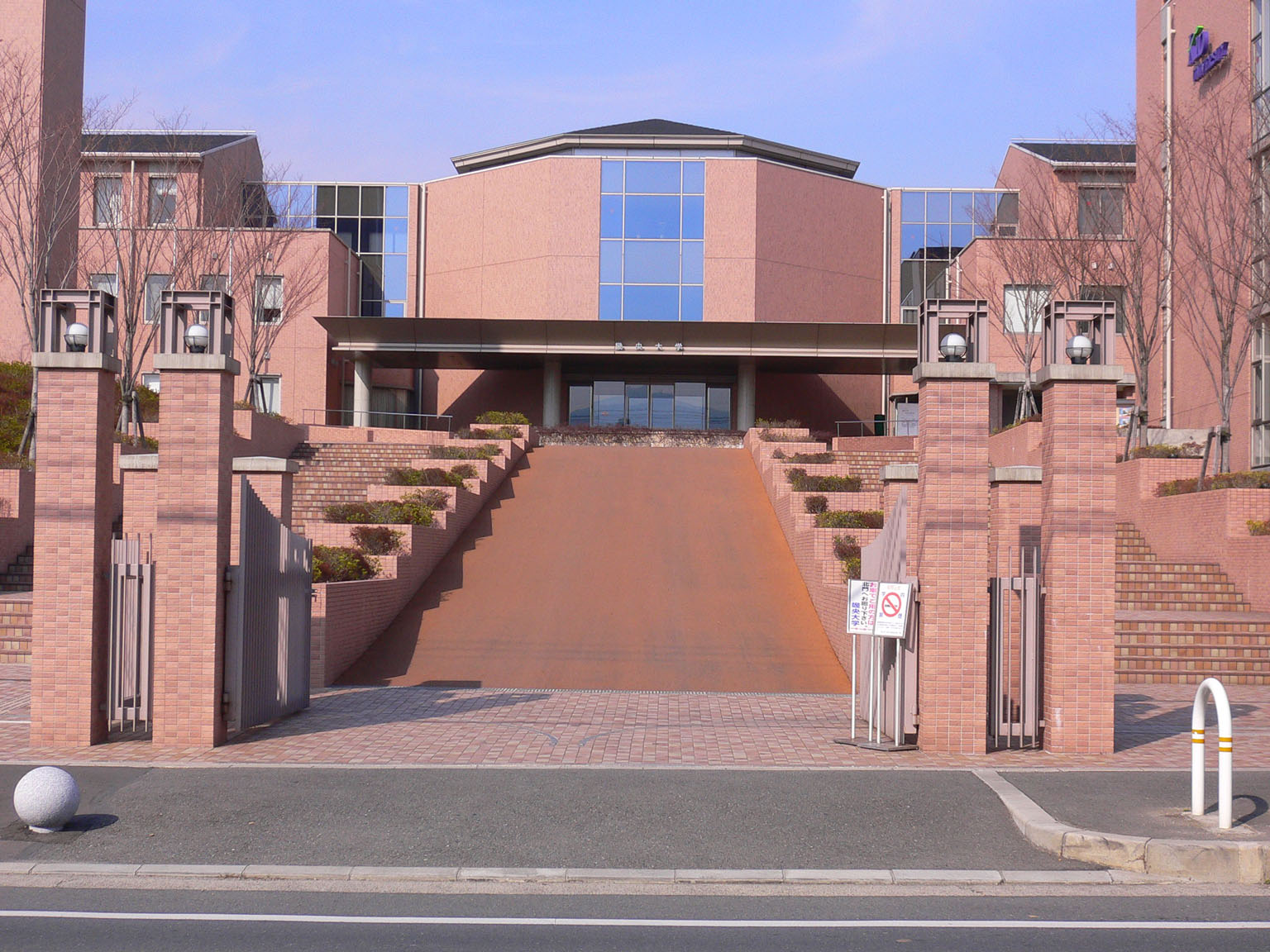
- Type: Private
- Established: 2003
- President: Masahiko Fuyuki
- Location: Kōryō, Nara, Japan
- Website: Official website

Kio University (畿央大学, Kiō daigaku) is a private university in the town of Kōryō in Nara Prefecture, Japan. The predecessor of the school was founded in 1946, and it was chartered as a university in 2003. The university has undergraduate and graduate programs in health sciences and education, as well as an advanced course in midwifery.
