= Yamato-Yagi Station =

Railway station in Kashihara, Nara Prefecture, Japan

Yamato-Yagi Station 大和八木駅
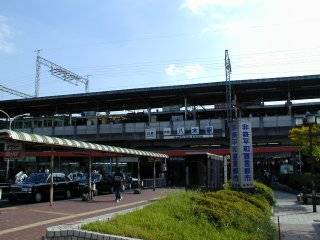
- Yamato-Yagi Station, March 2005

General information
- Location: 5-1-2 Naizenchō, Kashihara-shi, Nara-ken 634-0804; Japan
- Coordinates: 34°30′47″N 135°47′33″E
- Owner: Kintetsu Railway
- Operator: Kintetsu Railway
- Lines: D Osaka Line; B Kashihara Line
- Platforms: 2 side + 2 island platforms
- Train operators: Kintetsu Railway
- Connections: Nara Kotsu Bus Lines

Construction
- Structure type: At grade
- Parking: None
- Cycle facilities: Available
- Accessible: Yes

Other information
- Station code: B39 D39
- Website: www.kintetsu.co.jp/station/station_info/station02030.html

History
- Opened: 21 March 1923
- Former names: Yagi; Daiki Yagi (until 1929)

Passengers
- FY2019: 18,621

Services
Preceding station	Kintetsu Railway	Following station
Yamato-Takada towards Osaka Uehommachi	Osaka Line Rapid Express Express	Sakurai towards Ise-Nakagawa
Masuga towards Osaka Uehommachi	Osaka Line Semi-Express Local	Miminashi towards Ise-Nakagawa
Tawaramoto towards Yamato-Saidaiji	Kashihara Line Express	Ninokuchi towards Kashiharajingū-mae
Masuga towards Yamato-Saidaiji	Kashihara Line Local	Yagi-nishiguchi towards Kashiharajingū-mae
Location

Yamato-Yagi Station (大和八木駅, Yamato-Yagi-eki) is a junction passenger railway station located in the city of Kashihara, Nara Prefecture, Japan. It is operated by the private transportation company, Kintetsu Railway. It is the only Kintetsu station with an intersection that is not served by other railways.

== Line ==
Yamato-Yagi Station is served by the Kashihara Line and is 20.5 kilometers from the starting point of the line at Yamato-Saidaiji and 55.1 kilometers from Kyoto. It is also served by the Osaka Line, and is 34.8 kilometers from the starting point of that line at Osaka-Uehommachi.

== Layout ==
The station consists of two ground level side platforms, with a usable length of 6 cars of the Kashihara Line, with two elevated island platforms on the second floor for the Osaka Line, with the island platforms with a usable length of 10 cars, at a right angle to the side platforms. There is only one ticket gate. The station is staffed.

== Platforms ==
1-2	■ D Osaka Line	for Nabari, Isuzugawa and Kintetsu-Nagoya
3-4	■ D Osaka Line	for Osaka-Uehommachi
5	■ B Kashihara Line	for Kashiharajingū-mae
6	■ B Kashihara Line	for Yamato Saidaiji and Kyoto

== History ==
The station opened on 21 March 1925 as Yagi Station (八木駅) on the Osaka Electric Tramway Unebi Line (now the Kashihara Line). The platform at that time was located at the current location of Yagi-nishiguchi Station. The Osaka Electric Tramway Yagi Line (now the Osaka Line) joined to the station on 21 March 1925. The station was renamed Daiki Yagi Station (大軌八木駅) in August 1928. The station was relocated on 5 January 1929 to its present location. It became a Kansai Express Railway station due to a company merger with Sangu Express Railway on 15 March 1941, and was renamed to its present name. Through a subsequent merger it became a station on the Kintetsu Railway on 1 July 1944.

== Passenger statistics ==
In fiscal 2019 the station was used by an average of 18,621 passengers daily (boarding passengers only).

== Surrounding area ==
- Kashihara City Office
- Nara Prefectural Kashihara Cultural Center
- Nara Prefecture Wood Hall
- Nara Prefecture Medical Association
- Nara Prefecture Medical Association Nursing College

== See also ==
- List of railway stations in Japan
