= List of dams in Mie Prefecture =

The following is a list of dams in Mie Prefecture, Japan.

== List ==
Name	Location	Opened	Height (meters)	Image
Ano Dam		1989	73	
Bandotame Dam		1963	29.5	
Erihara Dam				
Fudodani Dam		1961	20.5	
Hachisu Dam		1991	78	
Hinachi Dam		1998	70.5	
Isaka Dam		1966	34.5	
Kamiji Dam		1972	29.6	
Katada Dam		1929	26.6	
Kawakami Dam			84	
Kimigano Dam			73	
Kochi Dam		1963	24	
Kokatsura-ike Dam		1895	15	
Komono Dam				
Komori Dam			34	
Kuchisubo Dam			35	
Matsuo Dam		1963	17	
Midoro Dam		1970	26.2	
Misedani Dam		1966	39	
Miyagawa Choseichi Dam		1979	27	
Miyagawa Dam		1956	88.5	
Nakaoki-ike Dam		1990	17	
Nakazato Dam			46	
Nameri-ko Dam		1973	28.4	
Nanairo Dam		1965	61	
Nishikomenogawa Dam		1982	18.5	
Ohhira-ike Dam		1979	15.1	
Saigu Choseichi Dam		2011	16	
Sakakibara-ike Dam		1939	18.9	
Shorenji Dam		1970	82	
Taketani-ike Dam		1960	22	
Takigawa Dam		1999	29.8	
Takitani-ike Dam		1955	23.5	
Tobakochi Dam			39	
Yamasato-ohike Dam		1963	22	

== See also ==
- Media related to Dams in Mie prefecture at Wikimedia Commons
