= Nakazato =

Nakazato may refer to:

== Places ==
- Nakazato Dam, dam in Mie Prefecture, Japan
- Nakazato Station, Japanese railway station in Kami-Motoyama-cho, Sasebo City, Nagasaki Prefectureon the Nishi-Kyūshū Line.
- Echigo-Nakazato Station, Japanese railway station on the Jōetsu Line in Yuzawa, Minamiuonuma District, Niigata Prefecture
- Kami-Nakazato Station, Japanese railway station, JR East railway station located in Kita, Tokyo
- Ugo-Nakazato Station, Japanese railway station located in Semboku, Akita Prefecture

== People with the surname ==
- Harumi Nakazato (born 1962), Japanese sprint canoer
- Katsuhito Nakazato (born 1956), Japanese photographer
- Koichi Nakazato (born 1973), Japanese football player
- Koji Nakazato (born 1982), Japanese football player
- Shūgorō Nakazato (1919–2016), Japanese martial artist
- Takahiro Nakazato (born 1990), Japanese football player
- Toyoko Nakazato, Japanese opera singer
- Tsuneko Nakazato, real name Nakazato Tsune (1909–1987), pen-name of a novelist in Showa period in Japan

== See also ==
- Nakasato (disambiguation)
