= Mihata Kofun Cluster =

- 美旗古墳群 (Japanese)
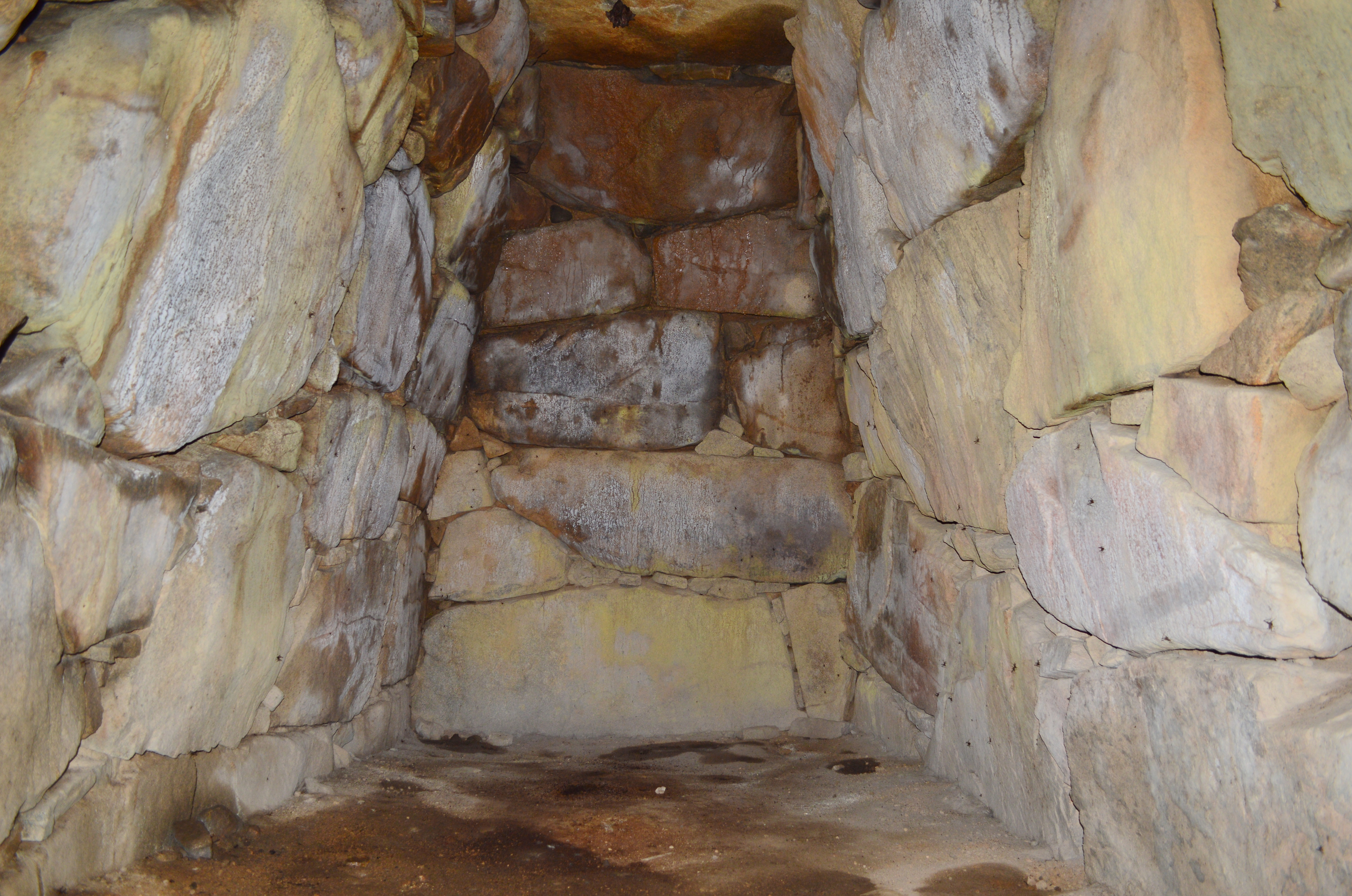
- Akaizuka Kofun burial chamber

- Mihata Kofun Cluster Mihata Kofun Cluster (Japan)
- 34°39′43″N 136°08′04″E
- Type: Kofun cluster
- Periods: Kofun period
- Location: Nabari, Mie, Japan
- Region: Kansai region

History
- Built: 4th to 6th century AD

Site notes
- Public access: Yes (no public facilities)

The Mihata Kofun Cluster (美旗古墳群) is a group of Kofun period burial mounds located in the Mihata neighborhood of the city of Nabari, Mie in the Kansai region of Japan. It was designated a National Historic Site of Japan in 1978. It is the largest group of kofun in the Iga region.

== Overview ==
The Mihata Kofun Cluster is located in the Nabari Basin, and currently consists of seven tumuli. Five of these are zenpō-kōen-fun (前方後円墳), which are shaped like a keyhole, having one square end and one circular end, when viewed from above. One is a circular-type (empun (円墳)), with a horizontal stone-lined burial chamber, and one is a square-type (hōfun (方墳)). The oldest dates from the latter half of the 5th century AD and it is speculated that these were the graves of the pre-Yamato conquest chieftains of the Iga region. There were once more tumuli scattered around this vicinity, but the others have been lost to urban development.

The 88 meter-long Tonozuka Kofun on the northeastern plateau edge is the oldest of the tumuli, from which fragments of horse fittings have been excavated. Approximately 300 meters to the southwest are the 100 meter Jōrōzuka Kofun and the Bishamonzuka Kofun, both of which have moats. Approximately 800 meters south of Bishamonzuka Kofun is the Umazuka Kofun which is the largest in the group with a total length of 142 meters. It has a moat 7 to 25 meters wide. A short distance to the east is the square Kozuka Kofun, and 600 meters southeast is the 55-meter long Kijinzuka Kofun, which has a shallow moat with a width of about 6 meters, and which is thought to date from the beginning of the 6th century. On the right bank of the Obata River, which is about 1.5 kilometers south of the Kijinzuka Kofun, is the Akaizuka Kofun, a circular burial mound with a diameter of about 30 meters.

The Umazuka Kofun is about a five-minute walk from Mihata Station on the Kintetsu Osaka Line.

Mihata Kofun Cluster (main tumuli)
Kofun name	Japanese	Type	Size	Remarks
Umazuka Kofun	馬塚古墳	zenpō-kōen-fun	length 142m; 98m dia x 14 m high / 100m width x 6m high	largest in the cluster
Kijinzuka Kofun	貴人塚古墳	zenpō-kōen-fun	length 55m; 35m dia x 4.5 m high / 35m width x 4m high	early 6th century
Bishamonzuka Kofun	毘沙門塚古墳	hotategaigata-kofun	length 65m; 44m dia x 7m high / 20m width x 3m high	
Jōrōzuka Kofun	女良塚古墳	hotategaigata-kofun	length 100m; 73m dia x 9m high / 40m width x 3m high	
Akaizuka Kofun	赤井塚古墳	enpun	22m dia x 8.5m high(formerly 30 m dia)	late 6th century
Tonozuka Kofun	殿塚古墳	zenpō-kōen-fun	length 92m; 56m dia x 7.2m high / 40m width x 6.2m high	late 4th century

== Gallery ==
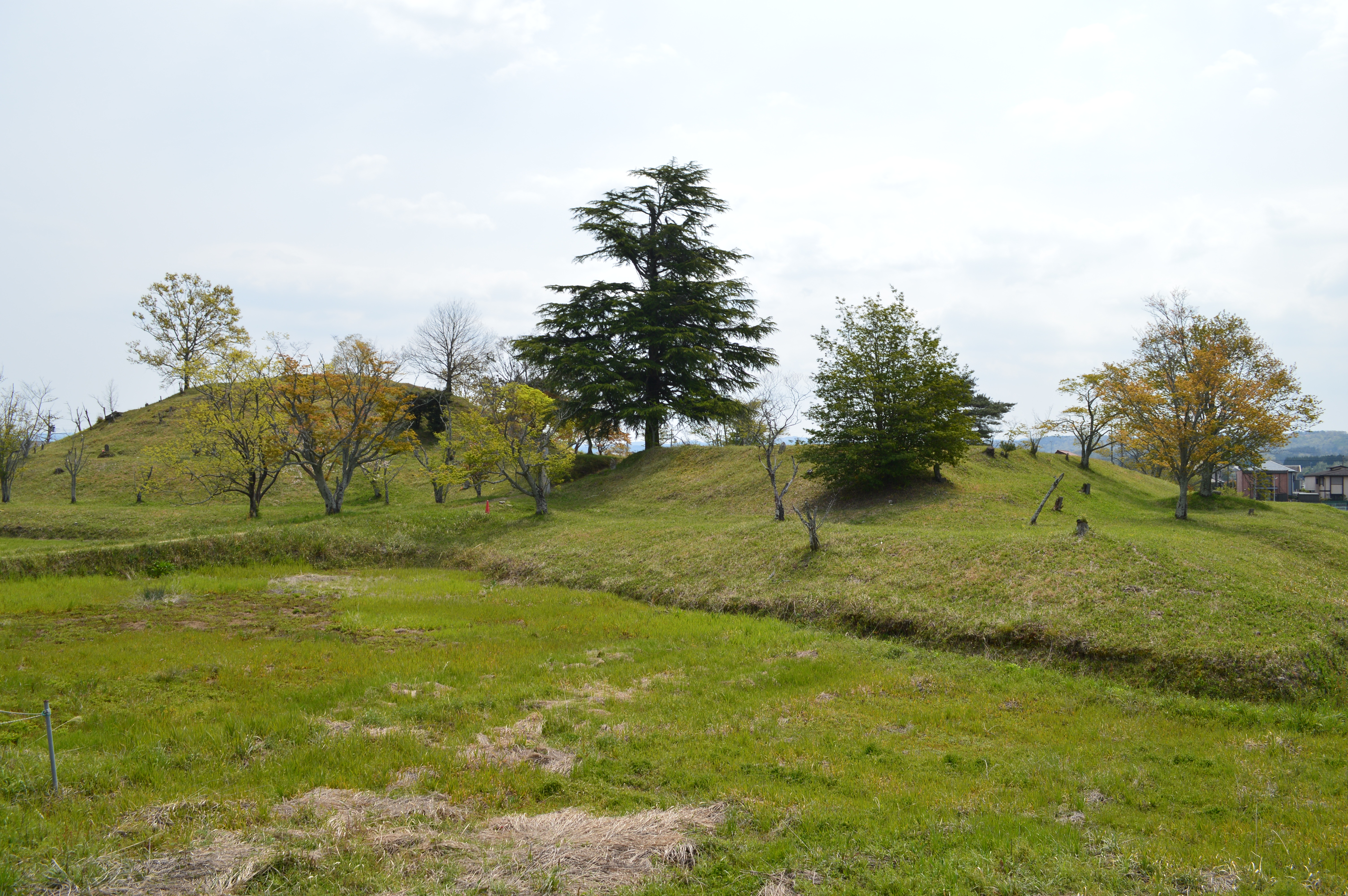
Umazuka Kofun

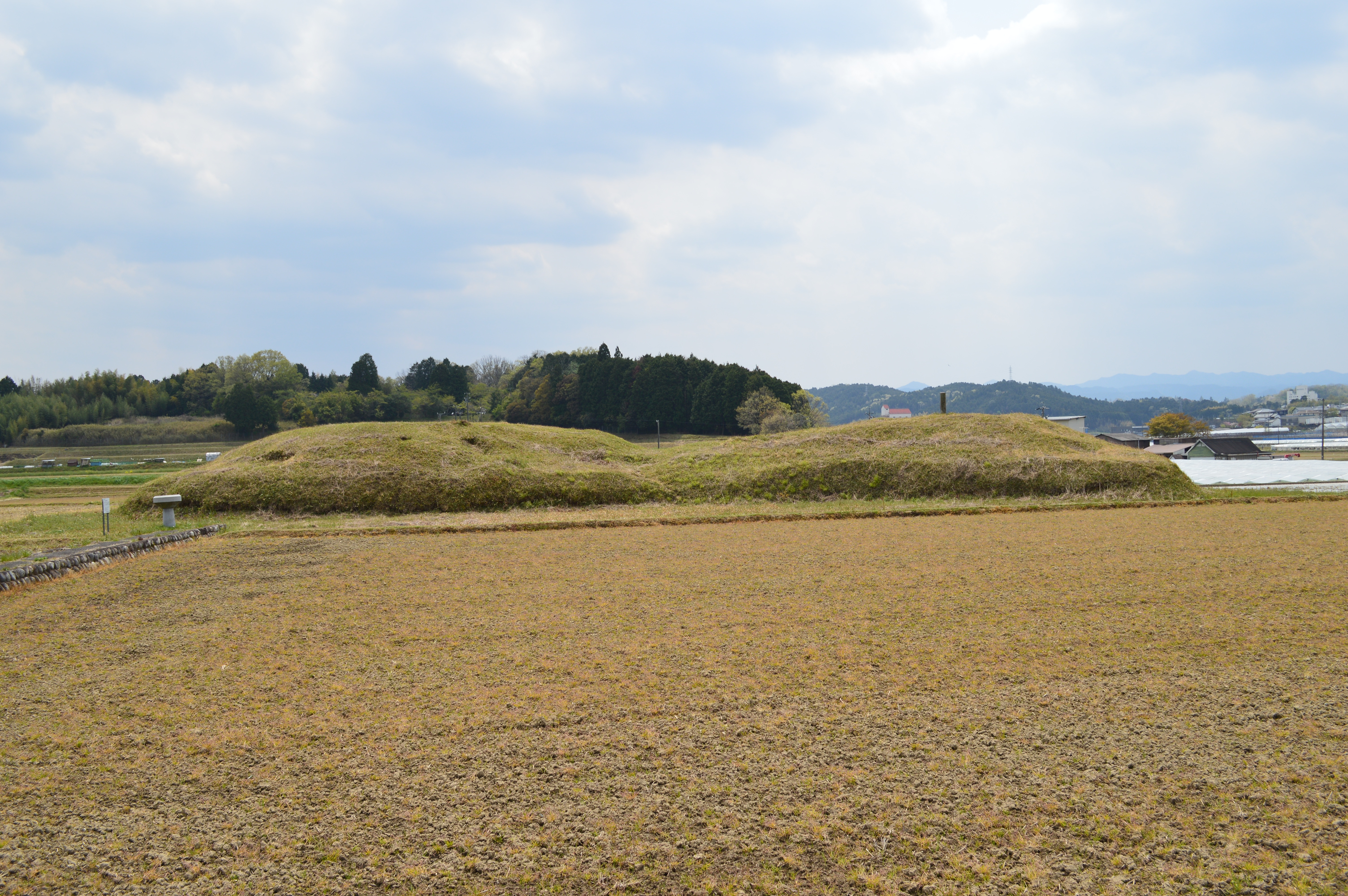
Kijinzuka Kofun

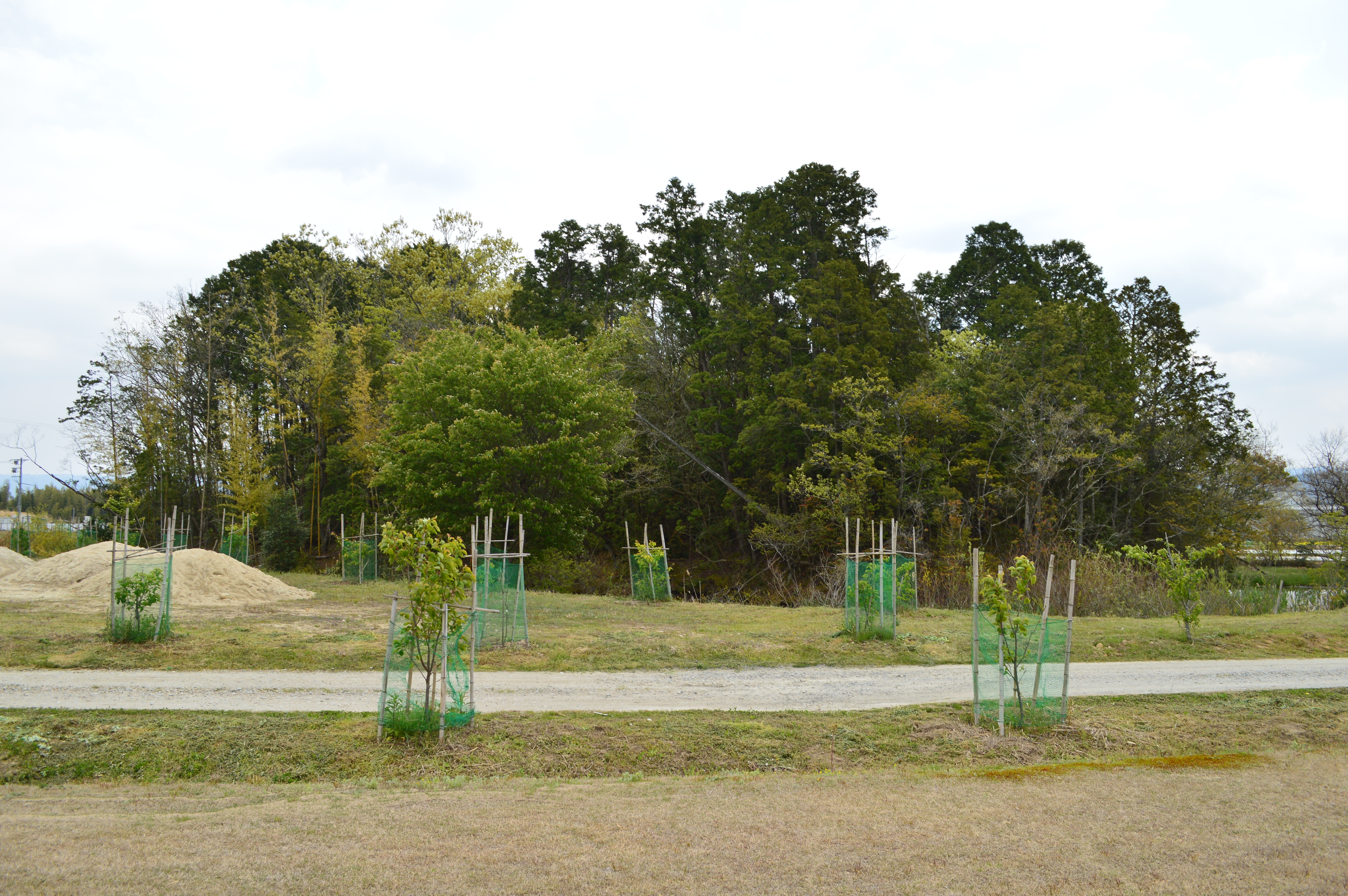
Bishamonzuka Kofun

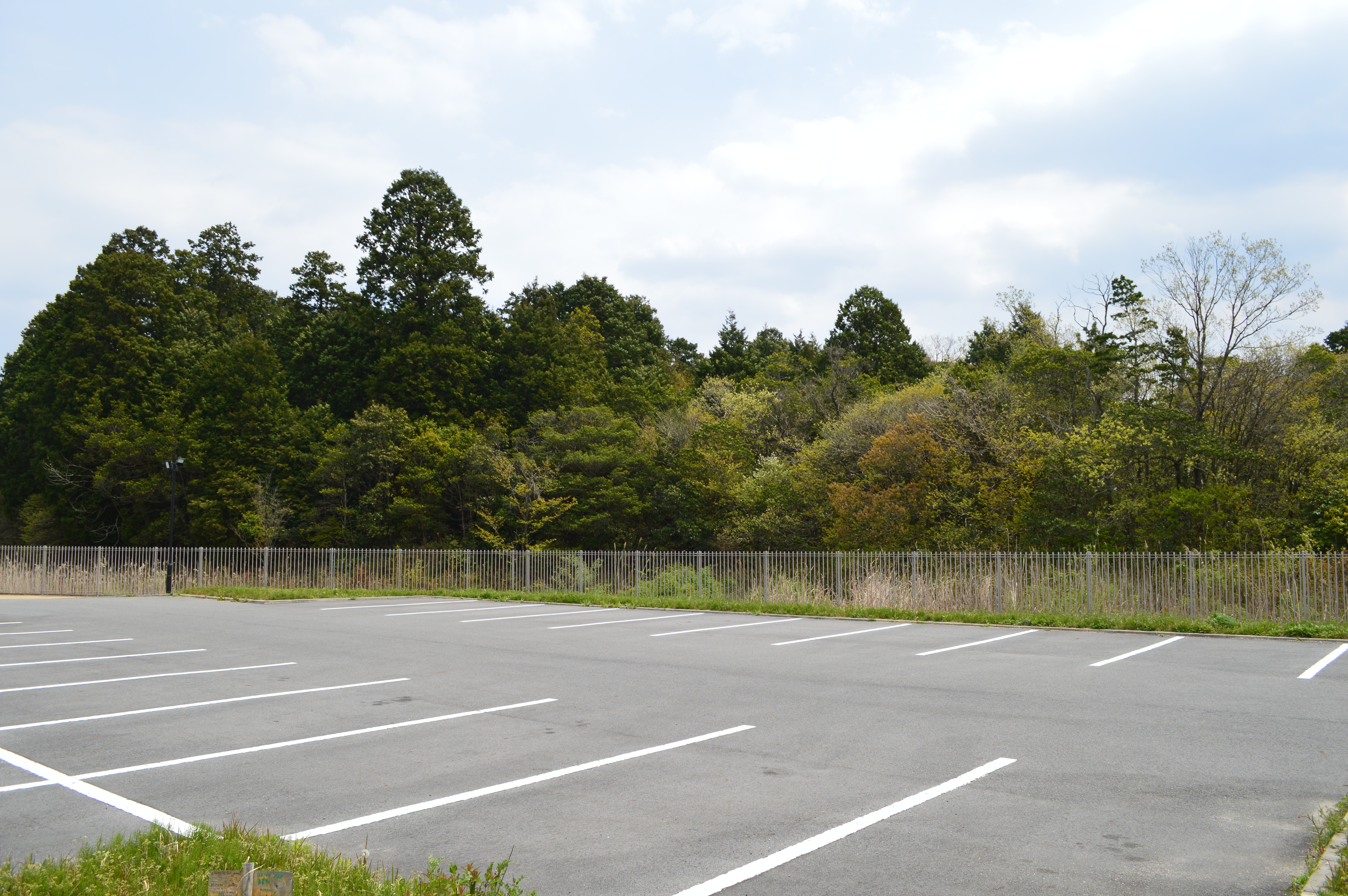
Jōrōzuka Kofun

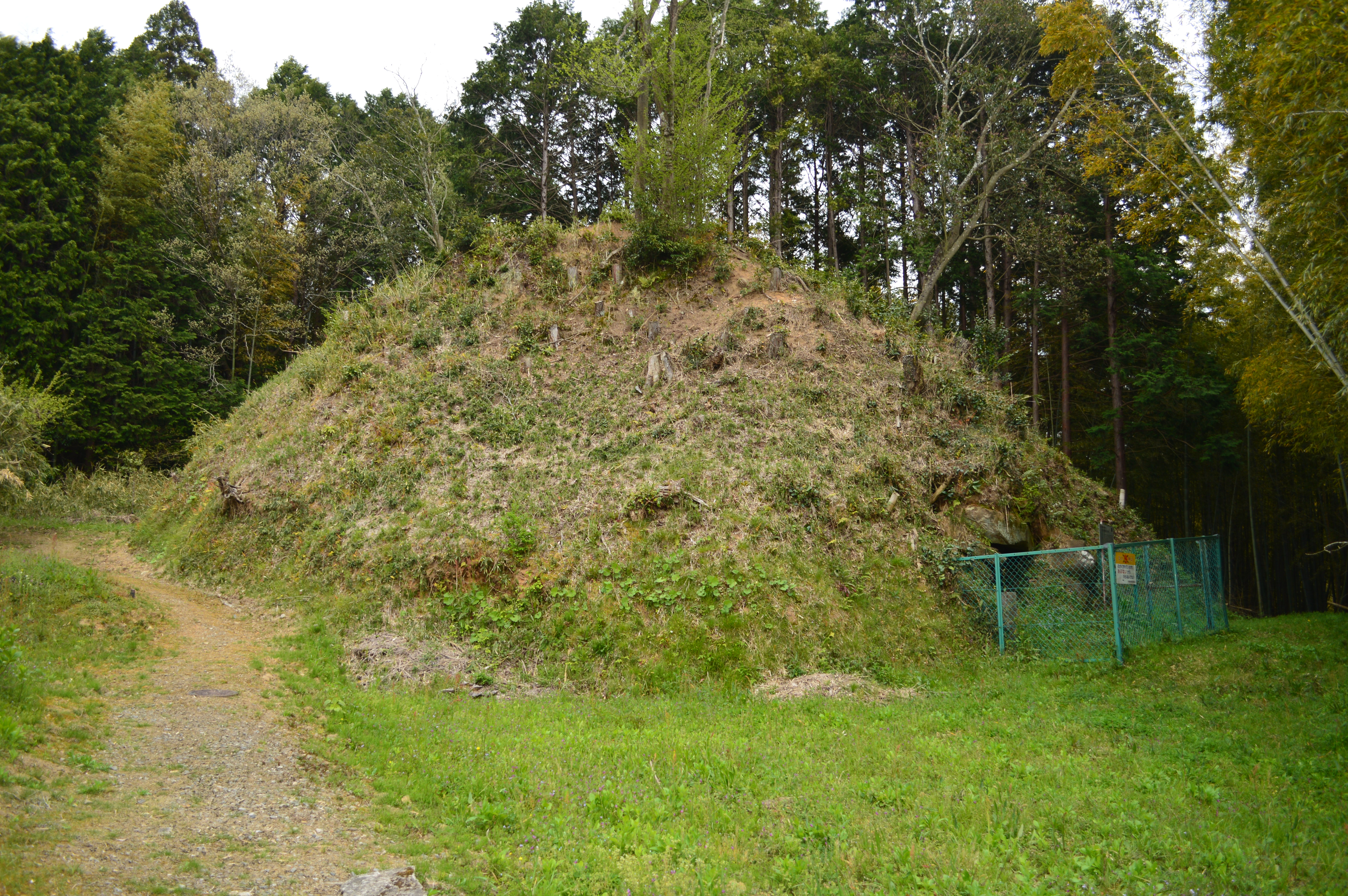
Akaizuka Kofun

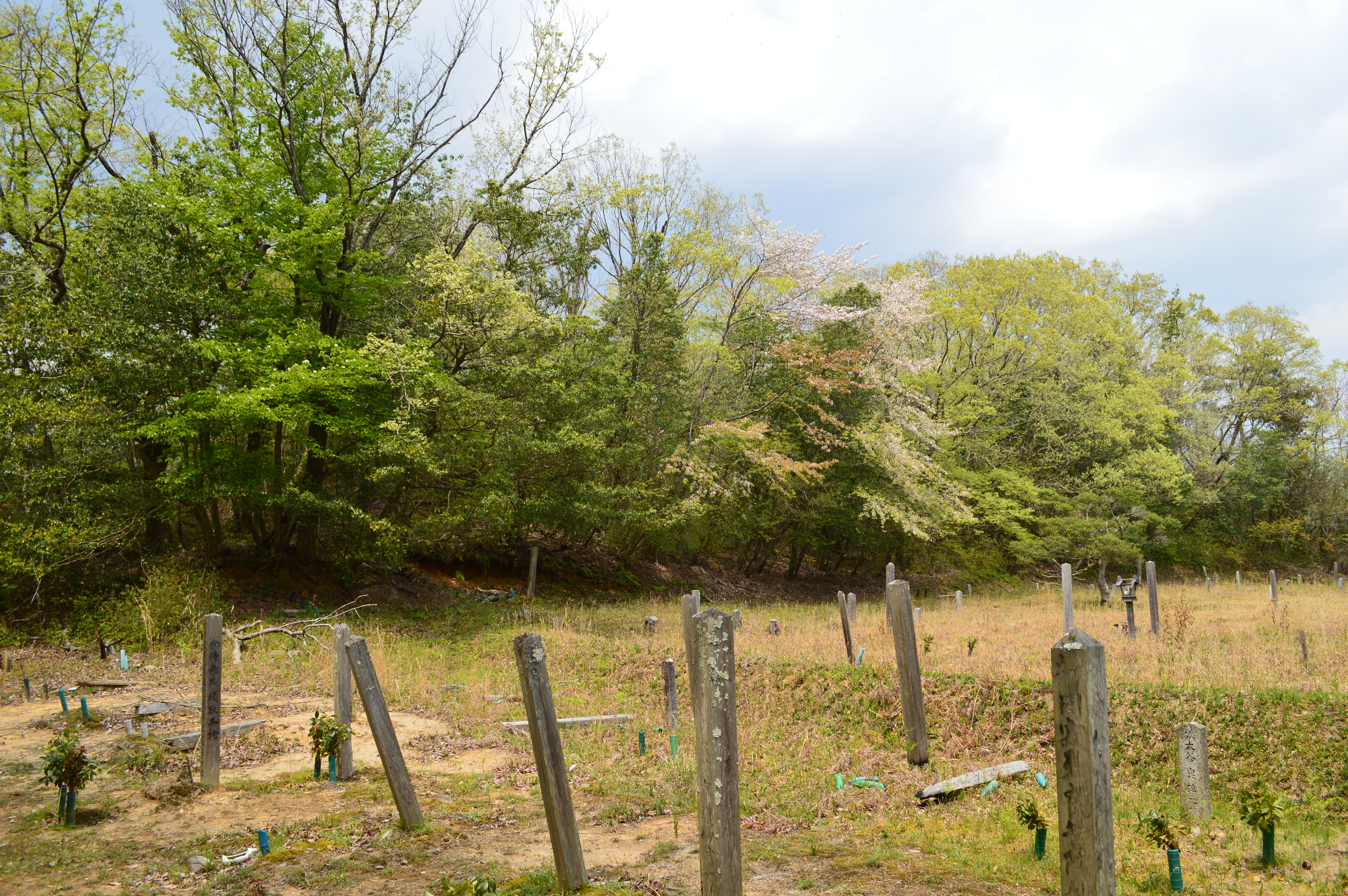
Tonozuka Kofun

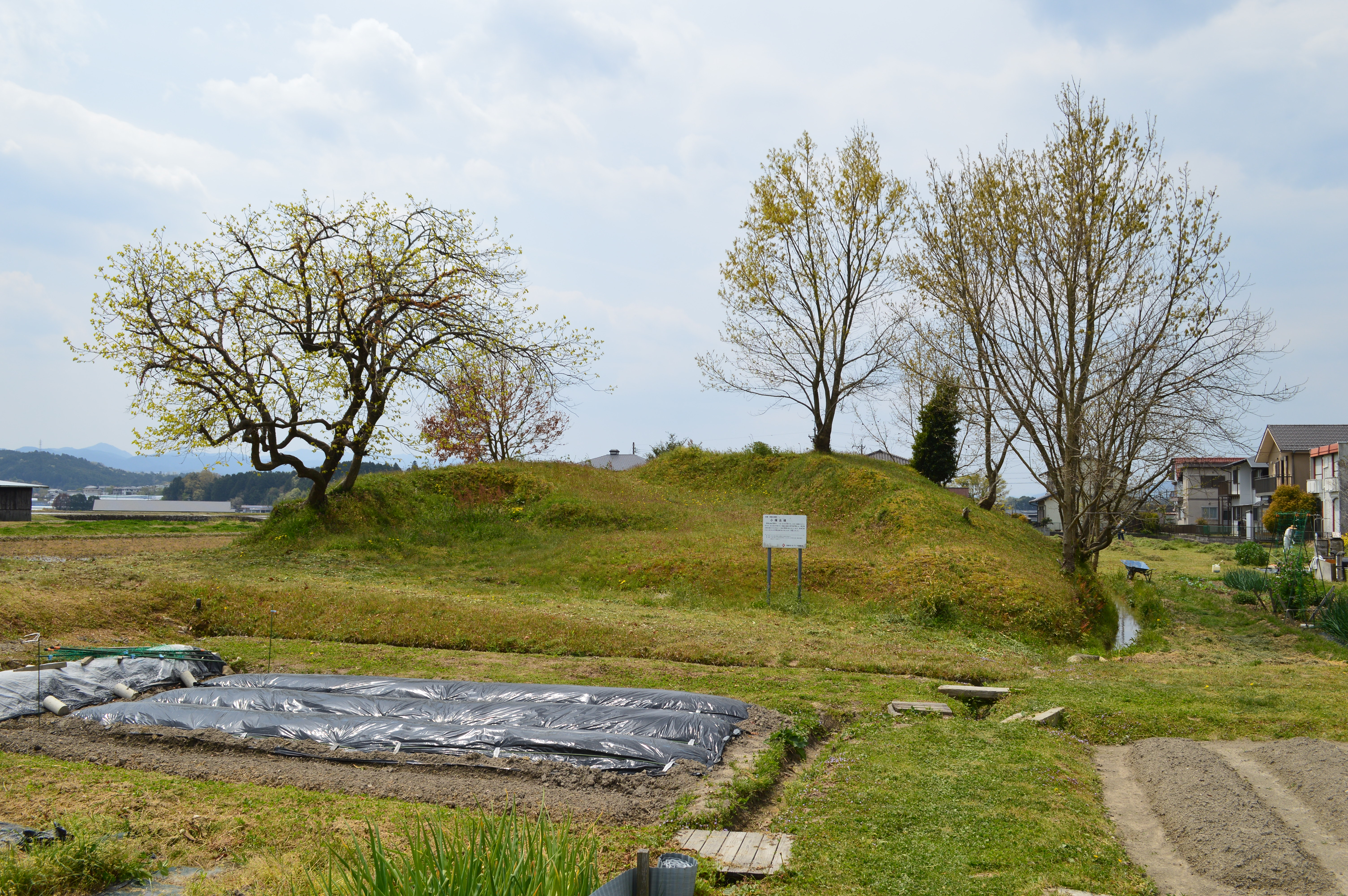
Kozuka Kofun

== See also ==
- List of Historic Sites of Japan (Mie)
