= Matsuo Dam =

Matsuo Dam may refer to:

- Matsuo Dam (Mie)
- Matsuo Dam (Miyazaki)
