= Kikyōgaoka Station =

Railway station in Nabari, Mie Prefecture, Japan

Kikyōgaoka Station 桔梗が丘駅
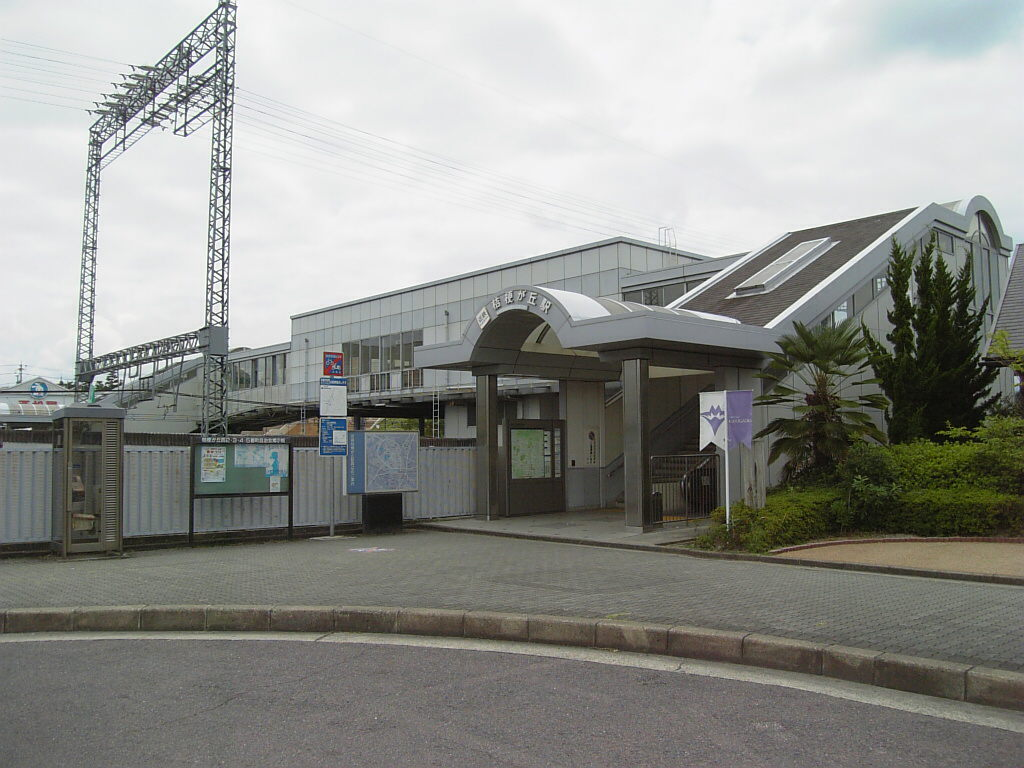
- Kikyōgaoka Station

General information
- Location: Kikyōgaoka ichiban-cho, Nabari-shi, Mie-ken 518-0621; Japan
- Coordinates: 34.6415°N 136.1124°E
- Operator: Kintetsu Railway
- Line: Osaka Line
- Distance: 70.0 km from Ōsaka Uehommachi
- Platforms: 2 side platforms

Other information
- Station code: D50
- Website: Official website

History
- Opened: October 1, 1964

Passengers
- FY2019: 2813 daily
Location
- Location within Mie Prefecture Location within Japan

Kikyōgaoka Station (桔梗が丘駅, Kikyōgaoka-eki) is a passenger railway station in located in the city of Nabari, Mie Prefecture, Japan, operated by the private railway operator Kintetsu Railway.

== Lines ==
Kikyōgaoka Station is served by the Osaka Line, and is located 70.0 rail kilometers from the starting point of the line at Ōsaka Uehommachi Station.

== Station layout ==
The station consists of two opposed side platforms, connected by an elevated station building above the platforms and tracks.

=== Platforms ===
1	■ Osaka Line	for Ise-Nakagawa, Ujiyamada, Kashikojima and Nagoya
2	■ Osaka Line	for Nabari, Yamato-Yagi and Osaka Uehommachi

== Adjacent stations ==
«	Service	»
Osaka Line
Nabari	Rapid Express	Mihata
Nabari	Express	Mihata
Nabari	Local	Mihata

== History ==
Kikyōgaoka Station opened on October 1, 1964, as a station on the Kintetsu Osaka Line. A new station building was completed in July 1970.

== Passenger statistics ==
In fiscal 2019, the station was used by an average of 2813 passengers daily (boarding passengers only).

== Surrounding area ==
- Kikyogaoka residential area

== See also ==
- List of railway stations in Japan
