= Nakasato =

Nakasato may refer to:

== Places ==
- Nakasato, Aomori, town located in Kitatsugaru District in western Aomori Prefecture, Japan
- Nakasato, Niigata, village located in Nakauonuma District, Niigata Prefecture, Japan
- Nakasato Station (Iwate), railway station on the Iwaizumi Line in Miyako, Japan, operated by East Japan Railway Company (JR East)
- Nakasato Station (Nagano), railway station on the Koumi Line, East Japan Railway Company (JR East), in Nagatoro in the city of Saku, Nagano
- Tsugaru-Nakasato Station, railway station on the Tsugaru Railway Company's Tsugaru Railway Line located in the town of Nakadomari, Aomori Prefecture, Japan

== People with the surname ==
- Toshinobu Nakasato (仲里 利信, born 1937), Japanese politician
- Yu Nakasato (中里 優, born 1994), Japanese women's footballer

== See also ==
- Nakazato (disambiguation)
