= Mihata Station =

Railway station in Nabari, Mie Prefecture, Japan

Mihata Station 美旗駅
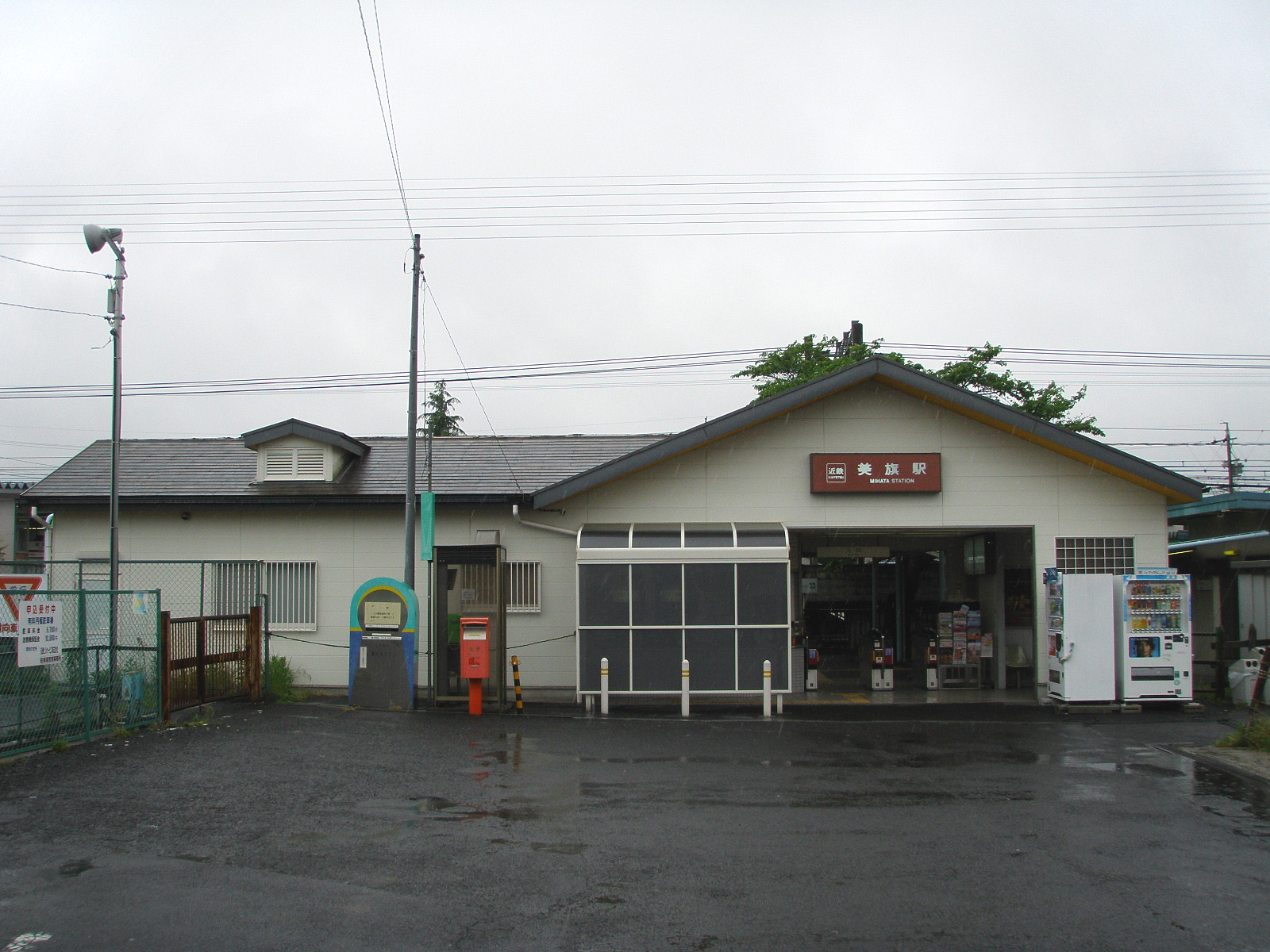
- Mihata Station in August 2007

General information
- Location: 1891 Mihata-cho Naka ichi-ban, Nabari-shi, Mie-ken 518-0617; Japan
- Coordinates: 34.6630°N 136.1333°E
- Operator: Kintetsu Railway
- Line: Osaka Line
- Distance: 73.1 km from Ōsaka Uehommachi
- Platforms: 2 side platforms

Other information
- Station code: D51
- Website: Official website

History
- Opened: 19 November 1930

Passengers
- FY2019: 767 daily
Location
- Location within Mie Prefecture Location within Japan

Mihata Station (美旗駅, Mihata-eki) is a passenger railway station in the city of Nabari, Mie Prefecture, Japan, operated by the private railway operator Kintetsu Railway.

== Lines ==
Mihata Station is served by the Osaka Line, and is located 73.1 rail kilometers from the starting point of the line at Ōsaka Uehommachi Station.

== Station layout ==
The station consists of two opposed side platforms, connected by an underground passage. The station is unattended and has an automatic ticket gate using the PiTaPa Icoca system.

=== Platforms ===
1	■ Osaka Line	for Ise-Nakagawa, Ujiyamada, Kashikojima, and Nagoya
2	■ Osaka Line	for Nabari, Yamato-Yagi and Osaka Uehommachi

== Adjacent stations ==
«	Service	»
Osaka Line
Kikyōgaoka	Rapid Express	Iga-Kambe
Kikyōgaoka	Express	Iga-Kambe
Kikyōgaoka	Local	Iga-Kambe

== History ==
Mihata Station opened on November 19, 1930 as a station on the Sangu Express Electric Railway. After merging with Osaka Electric Kido on March 15, 1941, the line became the Kansai Express Railway's Osaka Line. This line was merged with the Nankai Electric Railway on June 1, 1944 to form Kintetsu.

== Passenger statistics ==
In fiscal 2019, the station was used by an average of 767 passengers daily (boarding passengers only).

== Surrounding area ==
- Mihata Kofun Cluster
- Nabari Municipal Mihata Elementary School

== See also ==
- List of railway stations in Japan
