= Hinachi Dam =

Coordinates: 34°36′51″N 136°09′20″E

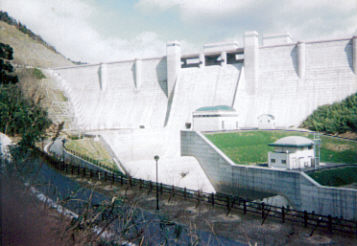
- Interactive map of Hinachi Dam
- Location: Nabari, Mie, Japan
- Construction began: 1972
- Opening date: 1998

Dam and spillways
- Type of dam: Concrete gravity dam
- Impounds: Nabari River
- Height: 70.5
- Length: 355 m (1,165 ft)
- Dam volume: 430,000 m^{3}

Reservoir
- Creates: Hinachi Reservoir
- Total capacity: 20,800,000 m^{3}
- Catchment area: 75.5 km^{2}
- Surface area: 82 ha

Hinachi Dam (比奈知ダム, Hinachi damu) is a dam in Nabari, Mie Prefecture, Japan, completed in 1998. It is located about 2 miles east of Shōrenji Dam, which impounds the Shorenji River, a left tributary of the Nabari River.
