= Shorenji Dam =

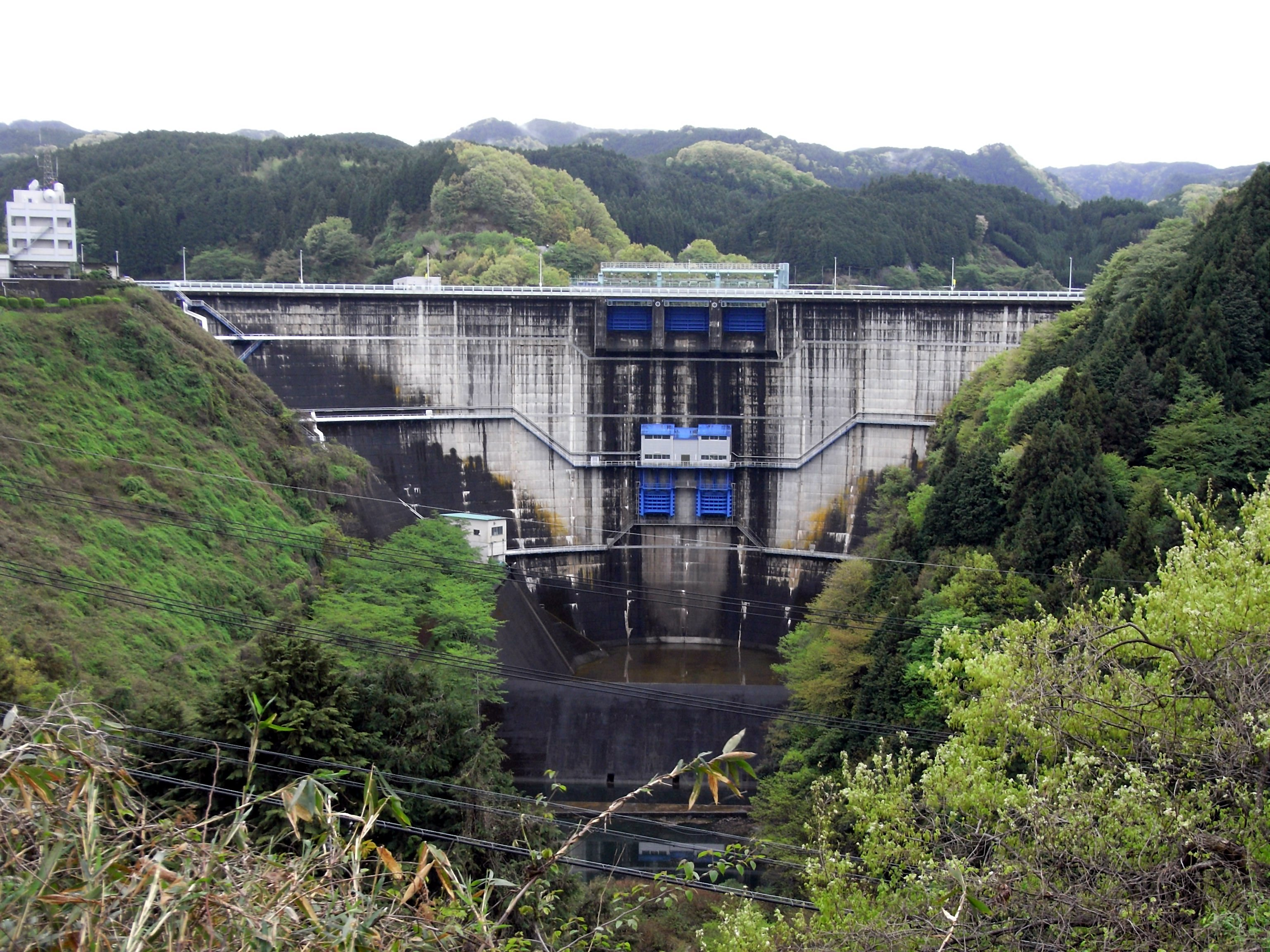
- Interactive map of Shorenji Dam
- Location: Nabari, Mie, Japan
- Coordinates: 34°36′15″N 136°07′12″E
- Construction began: 1964
- Opening date: 1970

Dam and spillways
- Type of dam: Concrete arch dam
- Impounds: Nabari River
- Height: 82 m (269 ft)
- Length: 275 m (902 ft)
- Dam volume: 175,000 m^{3}

Reservoir
- Creates: Shōrenji Reservoir
- Total capacity: 27,200,000 m^{3}
- Catchment area: 100 km^{2}
- Surface area: 104 ha

Shorenji Dam (青蓮寺ダム, Shōrenji damu) is a dam in Nabari, Mie Prefecture, Japan, completed in 1970. The dam impounds the Shorenji River, a left tributary of the Nabari River.

The dam is located near the scenic Kaochidani Valley, known for its andesite rock formations, autumn foliage, and cherry blossoms.

Shorenji Dam is located about 2 miles west of Hinachi Dam, which is on a different branch of the Nabari River.
