= Nakaoki-ike Dam =

Dam in Mie Prefecture, Japan

Nakaoki-ike
- Location within Japan
- Official name: 中沖池
- Location: Mie Prefecture, Japan
- Coordinates: 34°22′57″N 136°22′43″E
- Opening date: 1990

Dam and spillways
- Height: 17 m (56 ft)
- Length: 113 m (371 ft)

Reservoir
- Total capacity: 50 thousand cubic meters
- Surface area: 1 hectares

Nakaoki-ike (Japanese: 中沖池) is an earthfill dam located in Mie Prefecture in Japan. The dam is used for irrigation. The dam impounds about 1 ha of land when full and can store 50 thousand cubic meters of water. The construction of the dam was completed in 1990.

== See also ==
- List of dams in Japan
