= Toyoko Nakazato =

Japanese opera singer

Toyoko Nakazato (中里 豊子, Nakazato Toyoko) is a Japanese opera singer. In the 1990s to the early 2000s Nakazato had been active primarily in Mainland China, especially in Inner Mongolia. She received the nickname of "Swan of Songs" in that country.

In 1992 she first visited China. Shortly afterward she began doing voice training in that country. She became a professor emeritus at Inner Mongolia Art College and a visiting professor at Beijing Central Folk University, becoming the first non-Chinese to receive this status at the former and the first person to get this status at the latter. She moved to Chengdu, Sichuan in 1996, working at a talent research institution, Sichuan University, and Sichuan Music College. That November she created the Hiroshima International Music and Art Association (RIMA), known until 1998 as the Hiroshima Japan-China Exchange Association for Art and Music. Nakazato was the main "Green Ambassador" of a 2003 Japan Association for Cultural Exchange effort to plant 1,000 cherry trees in Beijing.
