= Kuchisubo Dam =

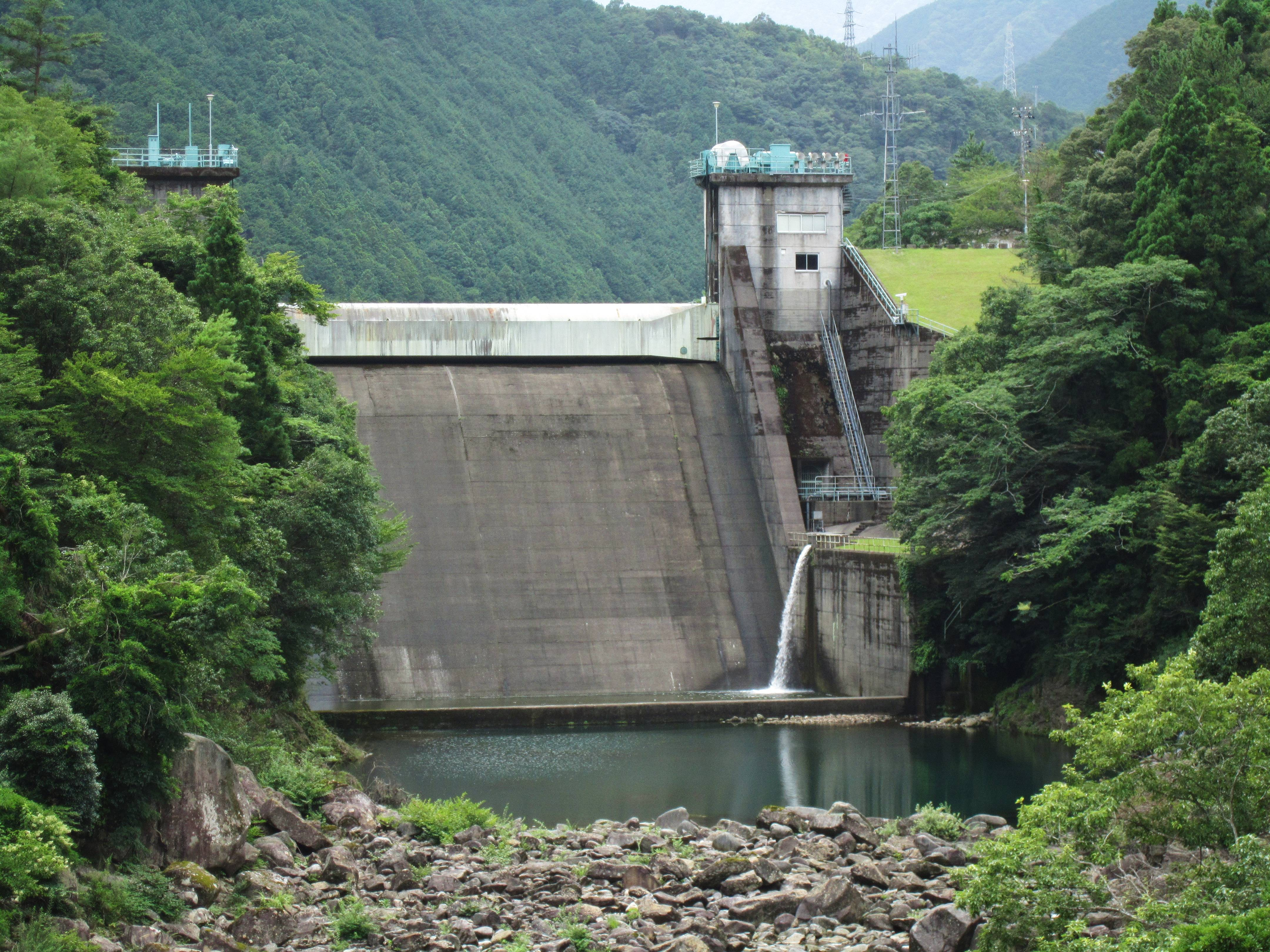
- Interactive map of Kuchisubo Dam
- Location: Mie Prefecture, Japan
- Coordinates: 34°05′28″N 136°09′33″E

Kuchisubo Dam (Japanese: クチスボダム) is a dam in Mie Prefecture, Japan, completed in 1961.
