= Ohhira-ike Dam =

Dam in Mie Prefecture, Japan

- Location within Japan
- Official name: 大平池
- Location: Mie Prefecture, Japan
- Coordinates: 34°48′39″N 136°16′10″E
- Construction began: 1973
- Opening date: 1979

Dam and spillways
- Height: 15.1 m (50 ft)
- Length: 130 m (430 ft)

Reservoir
- Total capacity: 140,000 m^{3} (4,900,000 cu ft)
- Surface area: 2 hectares (4.9 acres)

Ohhira-ike Dam (Japanese: 大平池) is an earthfill dam located in Mie Prefecture in Japan. The dam is used for irrigation. The dam impounds about 2 ha of land when full and can store 140 thousand cubic meters of water. The construction of the dam was started on 1973 and completed in 1979.

== See also ==
- List of dams in Japan
