= Nanairo Dam =

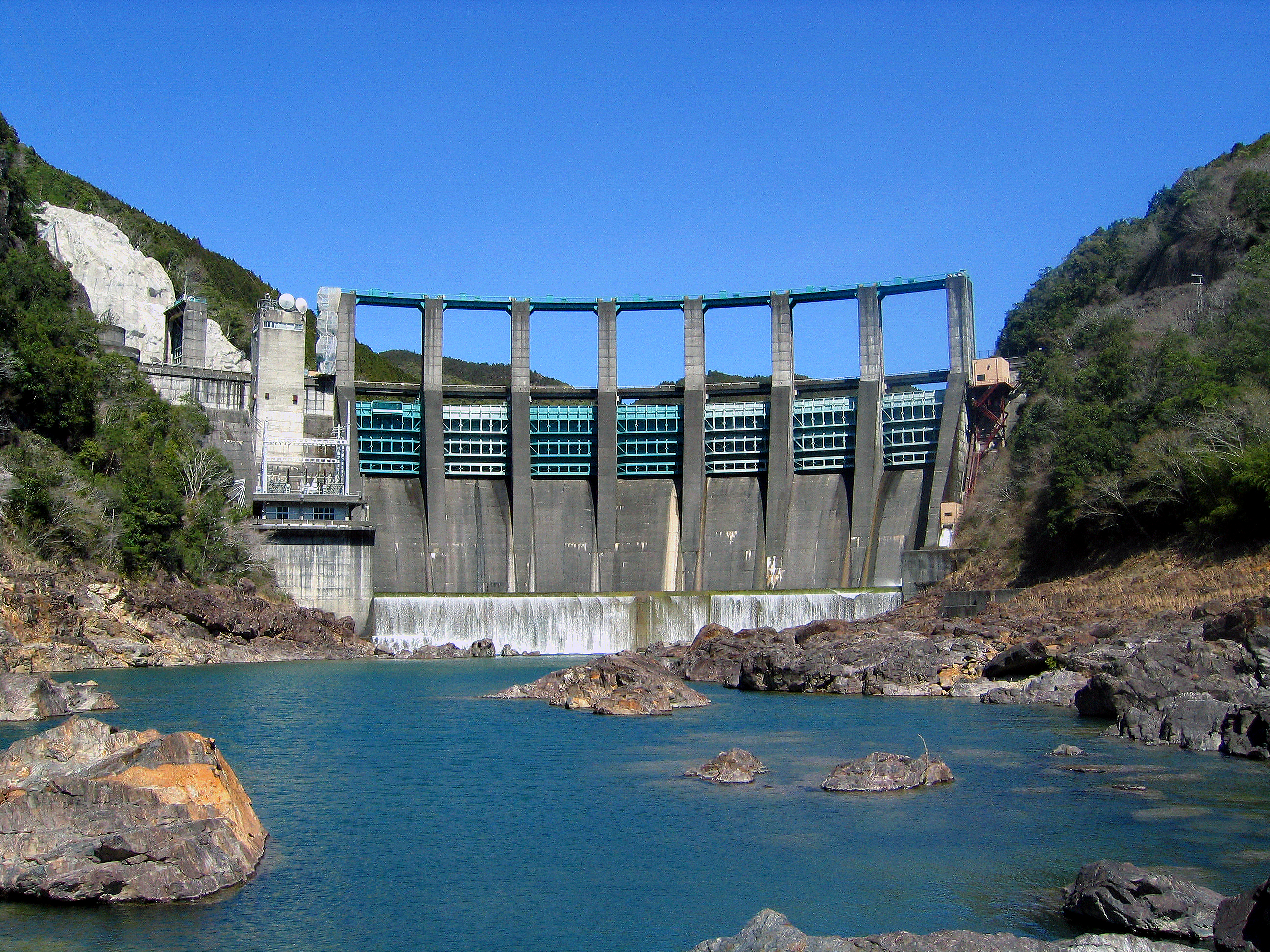
- Interactive map of Nanairo Dam
- Official name: 七色ダム
- Location: Kumano, Mie Prefecture, Japan
- Coordinates: 33°57′37″N 136°00′08″E
- Construction began: 1963
- Opening date: 1965
- Owner: Electric Power Development Company
- Operator: Electric Power Development Company

Dam and spillways
- Type of dam: Arch-gravity dam
- Impounds: Kitayama River of the Kumano River System
- Height: 61 m (200 ft)
- Length: 200.8 m (659 ft)

Reservoir
- Total capacity: 61,300,000 m^{3} (49,700 acre⋅ft)
- Catchment area: 462 km^{2} (178 sq mi)
- Surface area: 332 ha (820 acres)

Power Station
- Annual generation: 350 MW (470,000 hp)

The Nanairo Dam (七色ダム, Nanairo-damu) is a concrete gravity-arch dam located in Kumano, Mie Prefecture, Japan. The dam crosses the Kitayama River, a tributary of the Kumano River near the border of Mie Prefecture with Wakayama Prefecture.

The dam was constructed by Obayashi Corporation, with construction starting in 1963, and completed by 1965. It is currently owned maintained by the Electric Power Development Company. The primary purpose of the dam is hydroelectric power generation, with the dam supplying the nearby Ikehara Power Plant, with an installed turbine capacity of 350 megawatts (470,000 hp). The reservoir behind the dam also serves as a pumped storage facility in conjunction with neighboring Ikehara Dam in Wakayama.
