= Sakakibara-ike Dam =

Dam in Mie Prefecture, Japan

Sakakibara-ike
- Location within Japan
- Official name: 榊原池
- Location: Mie Prefecture, Japan
- Coordinates: 34°41′59″N 136°19′39″E
- Opening date: 1939

Dam and spillways
- Height: 18.9 m (62 ft)
- Length: 85 m (279 ft)

Reservoir
- Total capacity: 152,000 m^{3} (5,400,000 cu ft)
- Catchment area: 0.8 km^{2} (0.31 sq mi)
- Surface area: 4 hectares (9.9 acres)

Sakakibara-ike (Japanese: 榊原池) is an earthfill dam located in Mie Prefecture in Japan. The dam is used for irrigation. The catchment area of the dam is 0.8 km^{2}. The dam impounds about 4 ha of land when full and can store 152 thousand cubic meters of water. The construction of the dam was completed in 1939.

== See also ==
- List of dams in Japan
