= Tobakochi Dam =

Dam in Mie Prefecture, Japan

- Location within Japan
- Official name: 鳥羽河内ダム
- Location: Mie Prefecture, Japan
- Coordinates: 34°26′25″N 136°48′58″E
- Construction began: 1975

Dam and spillways
- Height: 39 m (128 ft)
- Length: 193 m (633 ft)

Reservoir
- Total capacity: 2,960,000 m^{3} (105,000,000 cu ft)
- Catchment area: 11.6 km^{2} (4.5 sq mi)
- Surface area: 33 hectares (82 acres)

Tobakochi Dam (Japanese: 鳥羽河内ダム) is an under-construction gravity dam located in Mie Prefecture in Japan. The dam is used for flood control. The catchment area of the dam is 11.6 km^{2}. The dam impounds about 33 ha of land when full and can store 2960 thousand cubic meters of water. The construction of the dam was started on 1975.

== See also ==
- List of dams in Japan
