= Nishikomenogawa Dam =

Dam in Mie Prefecture, Japan

- Location within Japan
- Official name: 西米の川ダム
- Location: Mie Prefecture, Japan
- Coordinates: 34°50′19″N 136°7′18″E
- Construction began: 1978
- Opening date: 1982

Dam and spillways
- Height: 18.5 m (61 ft)
- Length: 65.3 m (214 ft)

Reservoir
- Total capacity: 103,000 m^{3} (3,600,000 cu ft)
- Catchment area: 4.1 km^{2} (1.6 sq mi)
- Surface area: 2 hectares (4.9 acres)

Nishikomenogawa Dam (Japanese: 西米の川ダム) is a gravity dam located in Mie Prefecture in Japan. The dam is used for water supply. The catchment area of the dam is 4.1 km^{2}. The dam impounds about 2 ha of land when full and can store 103 thousand cubic meters of water. The construction of the dam was started on 1978 and completed in 1982.

== See also ==
- List of dams in Japan
