= Fudodani Dam =

Dam in Mie Prefecture, Japan

- Location within Japan
- Interactive map of Fudodani Dam
- Official name: 不動谷ダム
- Location: Mie Prefecture, Japan
- Coordinates: 34°13′26″N 136°8′41″E
- Construction began: 1957
- Opening date: 1961

Dam and spillways
- Height: 20.5 m (67 ft)
- Length: 44 m (144 ft)

Reservoir
- Total capacity: 71 thousand cubic meters
- Catchment area: 28.6 sq. km
- Surface area: 2 hectares

Fudodani Dam (Japanese: 不動谷ダム) is a gravity dam located in Mie Prefecture in Japan. The dam is used for power production. The catchment area of the dam is 28.6 km^{2}. The dam impounds about 2 ha of land when full and can store 71,000 m^{3} of water. The construction of the dam was started in 1957 and completed in 1961.

== See also ==
- List of dams in Japan
