= Miyagawa Choseichi Dam =

Dam in Mie Prefecture, Japan

- Location within Japan
- Official name: 宮川調整池
- Location: Mie Prefecture, Japan
- Coordinates: 35°5′04″N 136°29′45″E
- Construction began: 1977
- Opening date: 1979

Dam and spillways
- Height: 27 m (89 ft)
- Length: 350 m (1,150 ft)

Reservoir
- Total capacity: 854 thousand cubic meters
- Catchment area: 1.8 sq. km
- Surface area: 13 hectares

Miyagawa Choseichi Dam (Japanese: 宮川調整池) is an earthfill dam located in Mie Prefecture in Japan. The dam is used for irrigation. The catchment area of the dam is 1.8 km^{2}. The dam impounds about 13 ha of land when full and can store 854 thousand cubic meters of water. The construction of the dam was started on 1977 and completed in 1979.

== See also ==
- List of dams in Japan
