= Miyagawa Dam (Mie) =

Dam in Mie Prefecture, Japan

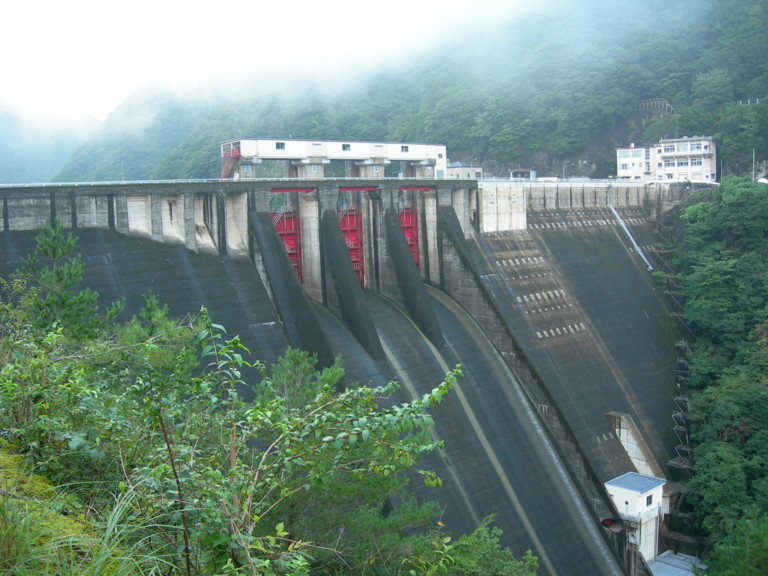

- Location within Japan
- Official name: 宮川ダム
- Location: Mie Prefecture, Japan
- Coordinates: 34°17′12″N 136°11′46″E
- Construction began: 1951
- Opening date: 1956

Dam and spillways
- Height: 88.5 m (290 ft)
- Length: 231 m (758 ft)

Reservoir
- Total capacity: 70500 thousand cubic meters
- Catchment area: 125.6 sq. km
- Surface area: 200 hectares

Miyagawa Dam (Japanese: 宮川ダム) is a gravity dam located in Mie Prefecture in Japan. The dam is used for flood control and power production. The catchment area of the dam is 125.6 km^{2}. The dam impounds about 200 ha of land when full and can store 70500 thousand cubic meters of water. The construction of the dam was started on 1951 and completed in 1956.

== See also ==
- List of dams in Japan
