= Kokatsura-ike Dam =

Dam in Mie Prefecture, Japan

- Location within Japan
- Official name: 小桂池
- Location: Mie Prefecture, Japan
- Coordinates: 34°24′51″N 136°29′44″E
- Opening date: 1895

Dam and spillways
- Height: 15 m (49 ft)
- Length: 48 m (157 ft)

Reservoir
- Total capacity: 80 thousand cubic meters
- Surface area: 1 hectares

Kokatsura-ike Dam (Japanese: 小桂池) is an earthfill dam located in Mie Prefecture in Japan. The dam is used for irrigation. The dam impounds about 1 ha of land when full and can store 80 thousand cubic meters of water. The construction of the dam was completed in 1895.

== See also ==
- List of dams in Japan
