= Misedani Dam =

Dam in Mie Prefecture, Japan

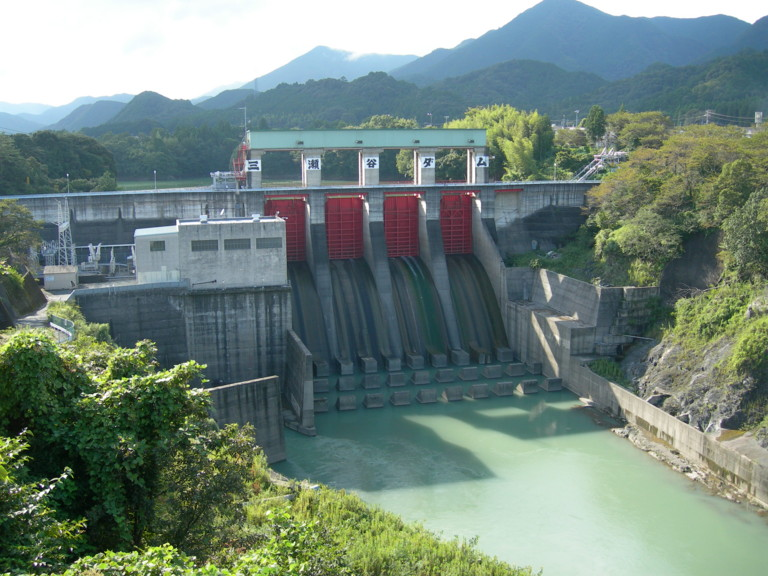
- Interactive map of Misedani Dam
- Official name: 三瀬谷ダム
- Location: Ōdai, Mie Prefecture, Japan
- Coordinates: 34°23′21″N 136°24′04″E
- Construction began: 1963
- Opening date: 1966
- Owner: Mie Prefecture
- Operator: Mie Prefecture

Dam and spillways
- Type of dam: Arch-gravity dam
- Impounds: Miyagawa River
- Height: 39 metres (128 ft)
- Length: 160 metres (520 ft)

Reservoir
- Creates: Lake Okuise
- Total capacity: 13,100,000 m^{3}
- Catchment area: 315.6 km^{2}
- Surface area: 86.0 ha

Power Station
- Annual generation: 11,200 KW

Misedani Dam (三瀬谷ダム, Misedani damu) is a multipurpose concrete Arch-gravity dam in located in Ōdai, Mie Prefecture, Japan. completed in 1966. The dam is one of several crossing the Miyagawa River, and was intended for hydroelectric power generation, and for the supply of industrial water to the Ise Bay industrial region.

The Misedani Dame was constructed by Nishimatsu Construction Co., Ltd., with construction starting in 1963, and completed by 1965. It is currently owned maintained by the Mie prefectural government.
