= Taketani-ike Dam =

Dam in Mie Prefecture, Japan

Taketani-ike
- Location within Japan
- Official name: 竹谷池
- Location: Mie Prefecture, Japan
- Coordinates: 34°50′07″N 136°15′37″E
- Opening date: 1960

Dam and spillways
- Height: 22 m (72 ft)
- Length: 208 m (682 ft)

Reservoir
- Total capacity: 215,000 m^{3} (7,600,000 cu ft)
- Catchment area: 2 km^{2} (0.77 sq mi)
- Surface area: 2 hectares (4.9 acres)

Taketani-ike (Japanese: 竹谷池) is an earthfill dam located in Mie Prefecture in Japan. The dam is used for irrigation. The catchment area of the dam is 2 km^{2}. The dam impounds about 2 ha of land when full and can store 215 thousand cubic meters of water. The construction of the dam was completed in 1960.

== See also ==
- List of dams in Japan
