= Matsuo Dam (Mie) =

Dam in Mie Prefecture, Japan

- Location within Japan
- Official name: 松尾ダム
- Location: Mie Prefecture, Japan
- Coordinates: 34°25′24″N 136°50′48″E
- Construction began: 1951
- Opening date: 1963

Dam and spillways
- Height: 17 m (56 ft)
- Length: 63.6 m (209 ft)

Reservoir
- Total capacity: 349 thousand cubic meters
- Catchment area: 10.1 sq. km
- Surface area: 10 hectares

Matsuo Dam (Japanese: 松尾ダム) is a gravity dam located in Mie Prefecture in Japan. The dam is used for flood control. The catchment area of the dam is 10.1 km^{2}. The dam impounds about 10 ha of land when full and can store 349 thousand cubic meters of water. The construction of the dam was started in 1951 and completed in 1963.

== See also ==
- List of dams in Japan
