= Bandotame Dam =

Dam in Mie Prefecture, Japan

Bandotame
- Location within Japan
- Interactive map of Bandotame
- Official name: 坂東溜
- Location: Mie Prefecture, Japan
- Coordinates: 35°8′54″N 136°34′32″E
- Opening date: 1963

Dam and spillways
- Height: 29.5 m (97 ft)
- Length: 123 m (404 ft)

Reservoir
- Total capacity: 81 thousand cubic meters
- Catchment area: 0.3 sq. km
- Surface area: 2 hectares

Bandotame (Japanese: 坂東溜) is an earthfill dam located in Mie Prefecture in Japan. The dam is used for irrigation. The catchment area of the dam is 0.3 km^{2}. The dam impounds about 2 ha of land when full and can store 81 thousand cubic meters of water. The construction of the dam was completed in 1963.

== See also ==
- List of dams in Japan
