= Takitani-ike Dam =

Dam in Mie Prefecture, Japan

Takitani-ike
- Location within Japan
- Official name: 滝谷池
- Location: Mie Prefecture, Japan
- Coordinates: 34°52′53″N 136°7′04″E
- Opening date: 1955

Dam and spillways
- Height: 23.5 m (77 ft)
- Length: 244 m (801 ft)

Reservoir
- Total capacity: 800,000 m^{3} (28,000,000 cu ft)
- Surface area: 11 hectares (27 acres)

Takitani-ike (Japanese: 滝谷池) is an earthfill dam located in Mie Prefecture in Japan. The dam is used for irrigation. The dam impounds about 11 ha of land when full and can store 800 thousand cubic meters of water. The construction of the dam was completed in 1955.

== See also ==
- List of dams in Japan
