= Saigu Choseichi Dam =

Dam in Mie Prefecture, Japan

Saigu Choseichi
- Location within Japan
- Official name: 斎宮調整池
- Location: Mie Prefecture, Japan
- Coordinates: 34°30′39″N 136°36′27″E
- Construction began: 1993
- Opening date: 2011

Dam and spillways
- Height: 16 m (52 ft)
- Length: 181 m (594 ft)

Reservoir
- Total capacity: 2,002,000 m^{3} (70,700,000 cu ft)
- Catchment area: 0.7 km^{2} (0.27 sq mi)
- Surface area: 30 hectares (74 acres)

Saigu Choseichi (Japanese: 斎宮調整池) is an earthfill dam located in Mie Prefecture in Japan. The dam is used for irrigation. The catchment area of the dam is 0.7 km^{2}. The dam impounds about 30 ha of land when full and can store 2002 thousand cubic meters of water. The construction of the dam was started on 1993 and completed in 2011.

== See also ==
- List of dams in Japan
