= Nameri-ko Dam =

Dam in Mie Prefecture, Japan

Nameri-ko
- Location within Japan
- Official name: 滑湖
- Location: Mie Prefecture, Japan
- Coordinates: 34°35′17″N 136°25′40″E
- Opening date: 1973

Dam and spillways
- Height: 28.4 m (93 ft)
- Length: 180 m (590 ft)

Reservoir
- Total capacity: 1300 thousand cubic meters
- Catchment area: 6.4 sq. km
- Surface area: 15 hectares

Nameri-ko (Japanese: 滑湖) is an earthfill dam located in Mie Prefecture in Japan. The dam is used for irrigation. The catchment area of the dam is 6.4 km^{2}. The dam impounds about 15 ha of land when full and can store 1300 thousand cubic meters of water. The construction of the dam was completed in 1973.

== See also ==
- List of dams in Japan
