= Takigawa Dam =

Dam in Mie Prefecture, Japan

- Location within Japan
- Official name: 滝川ダム
- Location: Mie Prefecture, Japan
- Coordinates: 34°43′01″N 136°12′52″E
- Construction began: 1990
- Opening date: 1999

Dam and spillways
- Height: 29.8 m (98 ft)
- Length: 120 m (390 ft)

Reservoir
- Total capacity: 282,000 m^{3} (10,000,000 cu ft)
- Catchment area: 1.6 km^{2} (0.62 sq mi)
- Surface area: 4 hectares (9.9 acres)

Takigawa Dam (Japanese: 滝川ダム) is a gravity dam situated in Mie Prefecture, Japan. It serves as a vital component for flood control and water supply. The dam's catchment area spans 1.6 km^{2}. When at full capacity, it impounds approximately 4 ha of land and can store 282 thousand cubic meters of water. Construction commenced in 1990 and was completed in 1999.

== See also ==
- List of dams in Japan
