= Anou Dam =

Dam in Mie Prefecture, Japan

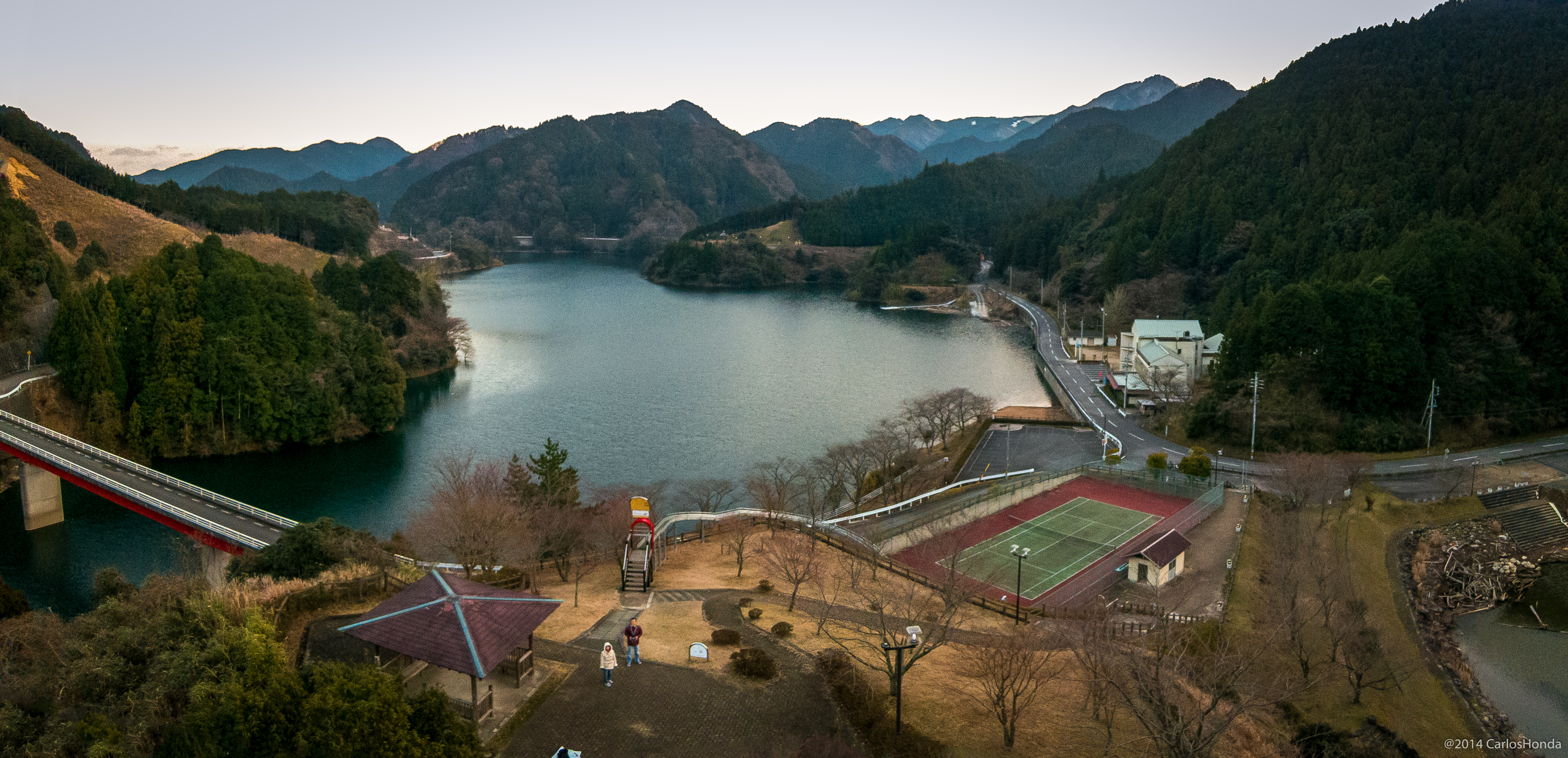

- Location within Japan
- Interactive map of Anou Dam
- Official name: 安濃ダム
- Location: Mie Prefecture, Japan
- Coordinates: 34°48′25″N 136°22′57″E
- Construction began: 1972
- Opening date: 1989

Dam and spillways
- Height: 73 m (240 ft)
- Length: 212 m (696 ft)

Reservoir
- Total capacity: 10500 thousand cubic meters
- Catchment area: 27.5 sq. km
- Surface area: 49 hectares

Anou Dam (Japanese: 安濃ダム) is a gravity dam located in Mie Prefecture in Japan. The dam is used for irrigation. The catchment area of the dam is 27.5 km^{2}. The dam impounds about 49 ha of land when full and can store 10500 thousand cubic meters of water. The construction of the dam was started on 1972 and completed in 1989.

== See also ==
- List of dams in Japan
