= Yamasato-ohike Dam =

Dam in Mie Prefecture, Japan

Yamasato-ohike
- Location within Japan
- Official name: 山郷大池
- Location: Mie Prefecture, Japan
- Coordinates: 35°9′50″N 136°32′33″E
- Opening date: 1963

Dam and spillways
- Height: 22 m (72 ft)
- Length: 72 m (236 ft)

Reservoir
- Total capacity: 130,000 m^{3} (4,600,000 cu ft)
- Catchment area: 0.4 km^{2} (0.15 sq mi)
- Surface area: hectares

Yamasato-ohike (Japanese: 山郷大池) is an earthfill dam located in Mie Prefecture in Japan. The dam is used for irrigation. The catchment area of the dam is 0.4 km^{2}. The dam impounds about ha of land when full and can store 130 thousand cubic meters of water. The construction of the dam was started on and completed in 1963.

== See also ==
- List of dams in Japan
