= Erihara Dam =

Coordinates: 34°23′15.8″N 136°47′27″E

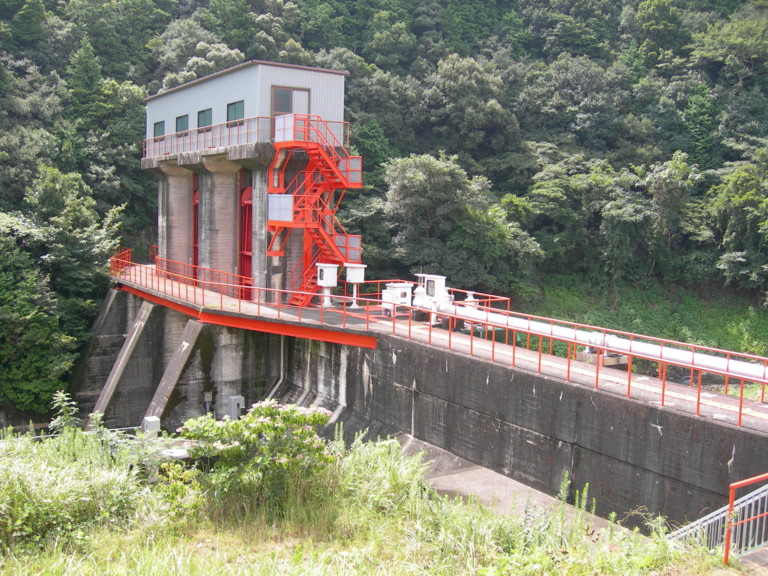
- Interactive map of Erihara Dam
- Location: Shima, Mie, Japan

Dam and spillways
- Impounds: Kamiji River

Erihara Dam (恵利原ダム) is a dam in Shima, Mie Prefecture, Japan.
