= Katada Dam =

Dam in Mie Prefecture, Japan

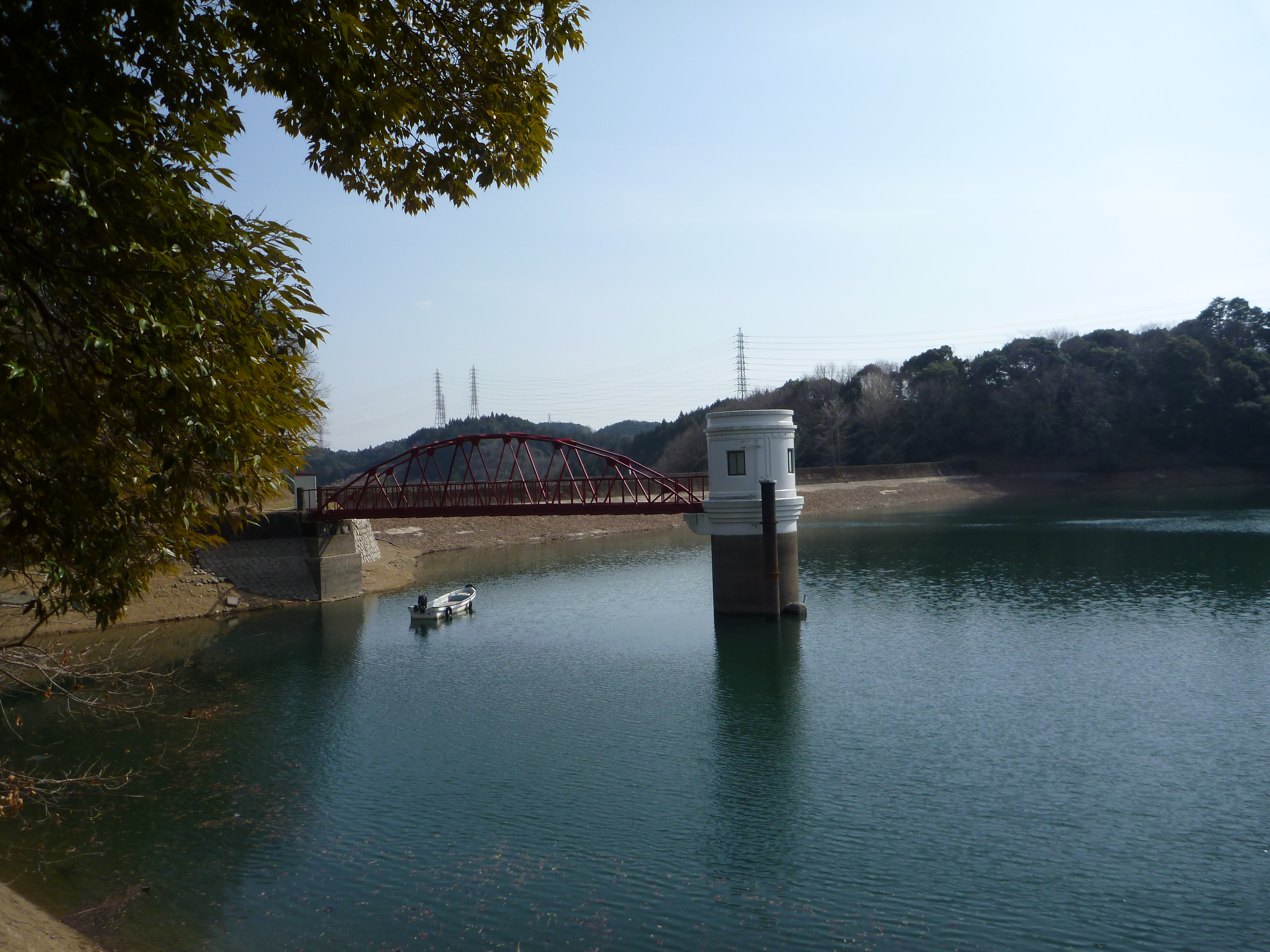

- Location within Japan
- Interactive map of Katada Dam
- Official name: 片田ダム
- Location: Mie Prefecture, Japan
- Coordinates: 34°42′51″N 136°24′59″E
- Construction began: 1921
- Opening date: 1929

Dam and spillways
- Height: 26.6 m (87 ft)
- Length: 131.6 m (432 ft)

Reservoir
- Total capacity: 1478 thousand cubic meters
- Catchment area: 29.5 sq. km

Katada Dam (Japanese: 片田ダム) is an earthfill dam located in Mie Prefecture in Japan. The dam is used for water supply. The catchment area of the dam is 29.5 km^{2}. The dam can store 1478 thousand cubic meters of water. The construction of the dam was started on 1921 and completed in 1929.

== See also ==
- List of dams in Japan
