= Midoro Dam =

Dam in Mie Prefecture, Japan

- Location within Japan
- Official name: 真泥ダム
- Location: Mie Prefecture, Japan
- Coordinates: 34°45′48″N 136°11′42″E
- Construction began: 1953
- Opening date: 1970

Dam and spillways
- Height: 26.2 m (86 ft)
- Length: 180 m (590 ft)

Reservoir
- Total capacity: 1291 thousand cubic meters
- Surface area: 20 hectares

Midoro Dam (Japanese: 真泥ダム) is an earthfill dam located in Mie Prefecture in Japan. The dam is used for irrigation. The dam impounds about 20 ha of land when full and can store 1291 thousand cubic meters of water. The construction of the dam was started on 1953 and completed in 1970.

== See also ==
- List of dams in Japan
