= Kamiji Dam =

Coordinates: 34°23′56″N 136°46′56″E

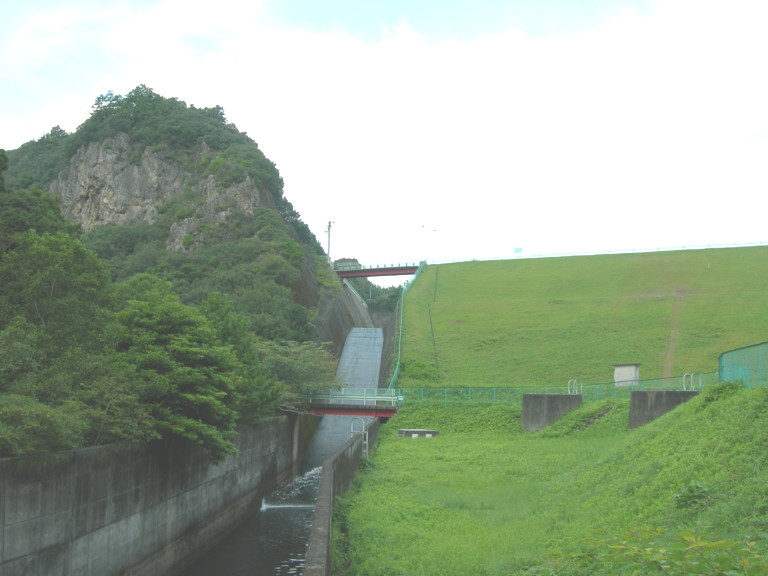
- Interactive map of Kamiji Dam
- Location: Shima, Mie, Japan
- Construction began: 1966
- Opening date: 1972

Dam and spillways
- Height: 29.6 m (97 ft)
- Length: 155.3 m (510 ft)
- Dam volume: 152,000 m^{3}

Reservoir
- Total capacity: 3,007,000 m^{3}
- Catchment area: 5 km^{2}
- Surface area: 32 hectares (79 acres)

Kamiji Dam (神路ダム, Kamiji damu) is a dam in Shima, Mie Prefecture, Japan.
