= Hachisu Dam =

Coordinates: 34°22′37″N 136°12′32″E

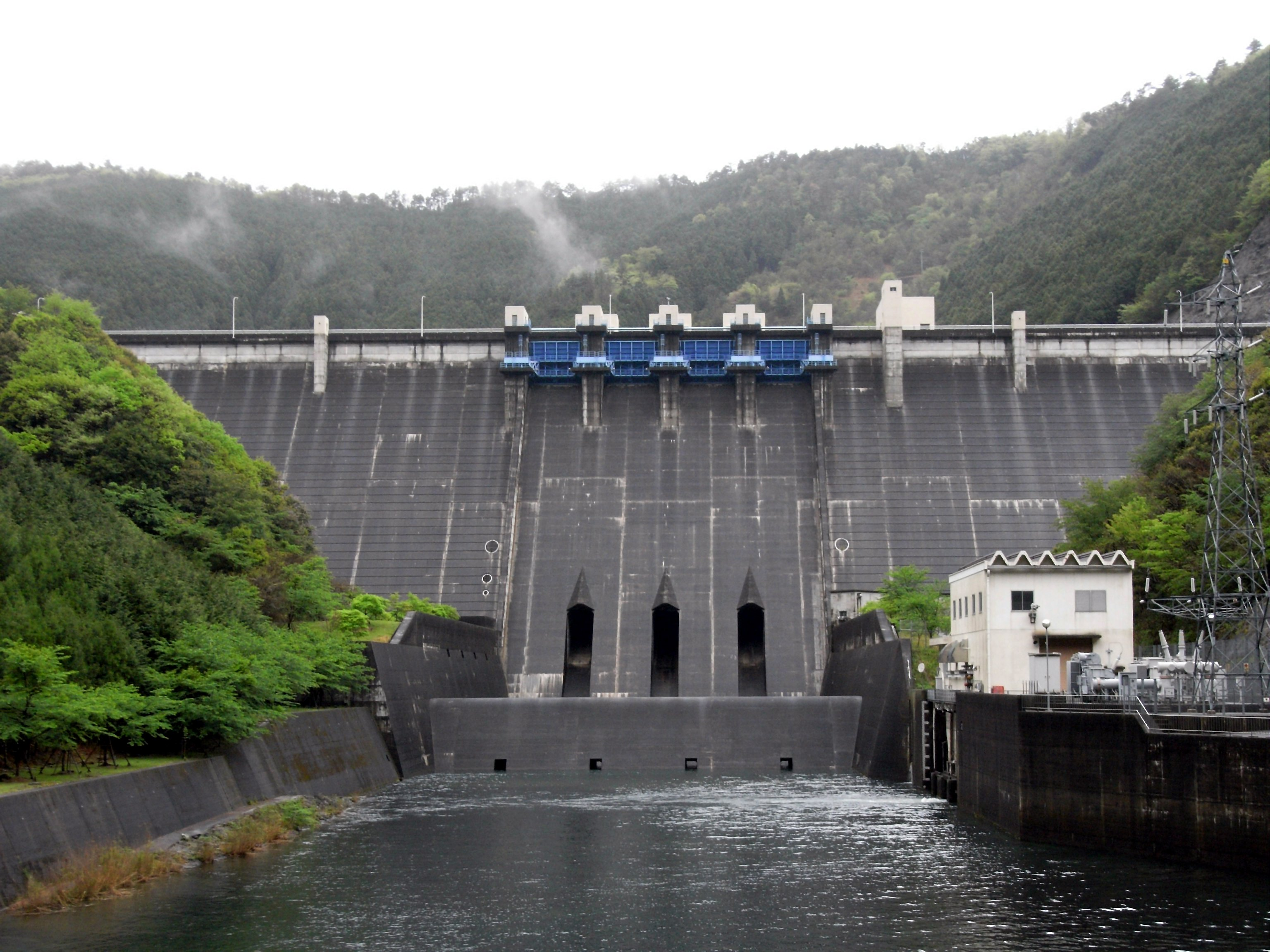
- Interactive map of Hachisu Dam
- Location: Matsuzaka, Mie, Japan
- Construction began: 1971
- Opening date: 1991

Dam and spillways
- Type of dam: Gravity dam
- Impounds: Hachisu River
- Height: 78 m (256 ft)
- Length: 280 m (920 ft)
- Dam volume: 484,000 m^{3}

Reservoir
- Creates: Okukahada Reservoir
- Total capacity: 32,600,000 m^{3}
- Catchment area: 80.9 km^{2}
- Surface area: 120 ha

Hachisu Dam (蓮ダム) is a dam in southwestern Matsuzaka, Mie Prefecture, Japan, completed in 1991.

65 houses submerged.
