= Nakazato Dam =

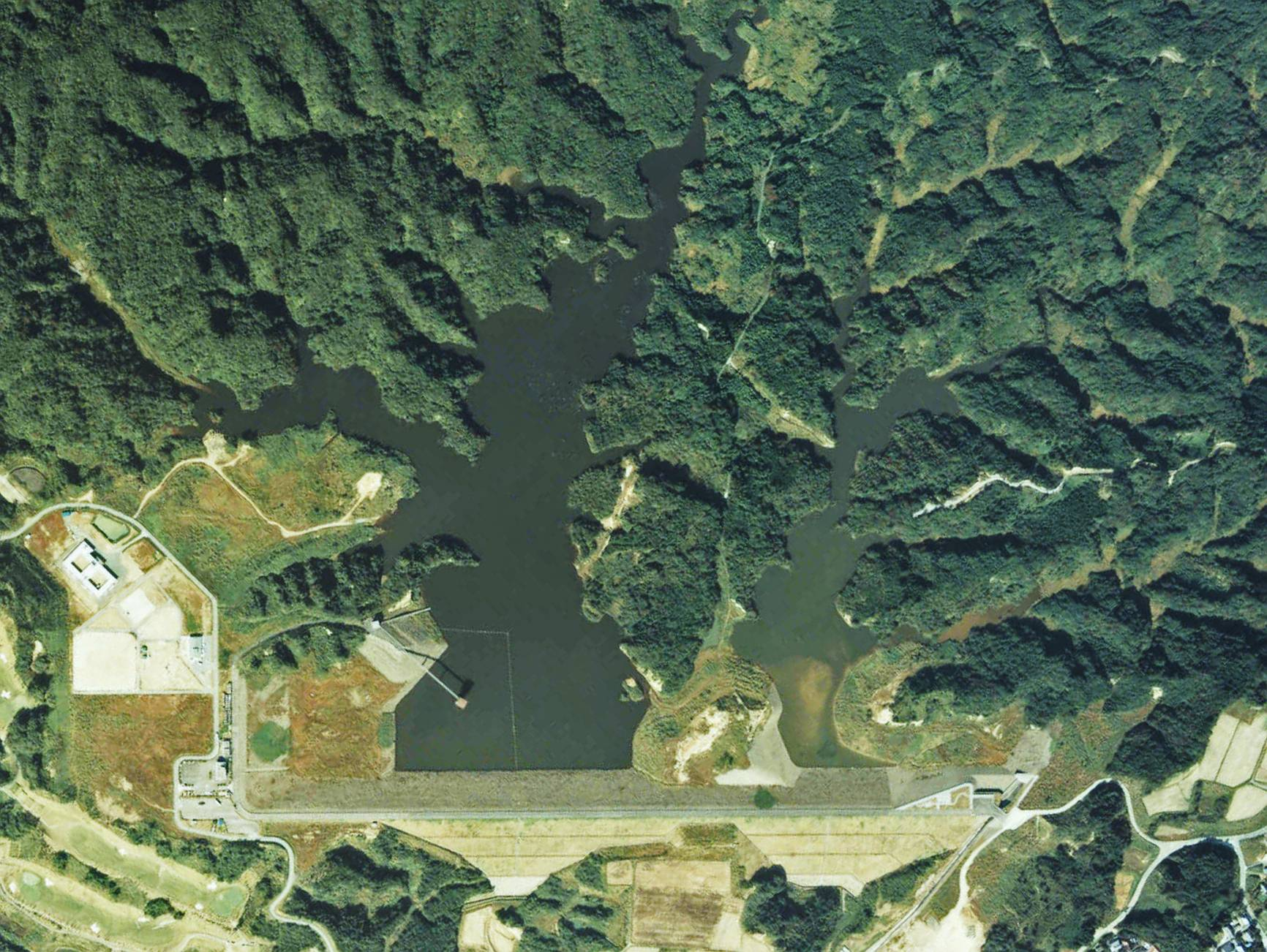
- Interactive map of Nakazato Dam
- Location: Mie Prefecture, Japan
- Coordinates: 35°13′14″N 136°28′55″E

Nakazato Dam (Japanese: 中里ダム) is a dam in Mie Prefecture, Japan, completed in 1976.
