= Nabari =

Nabari 名張市
- City
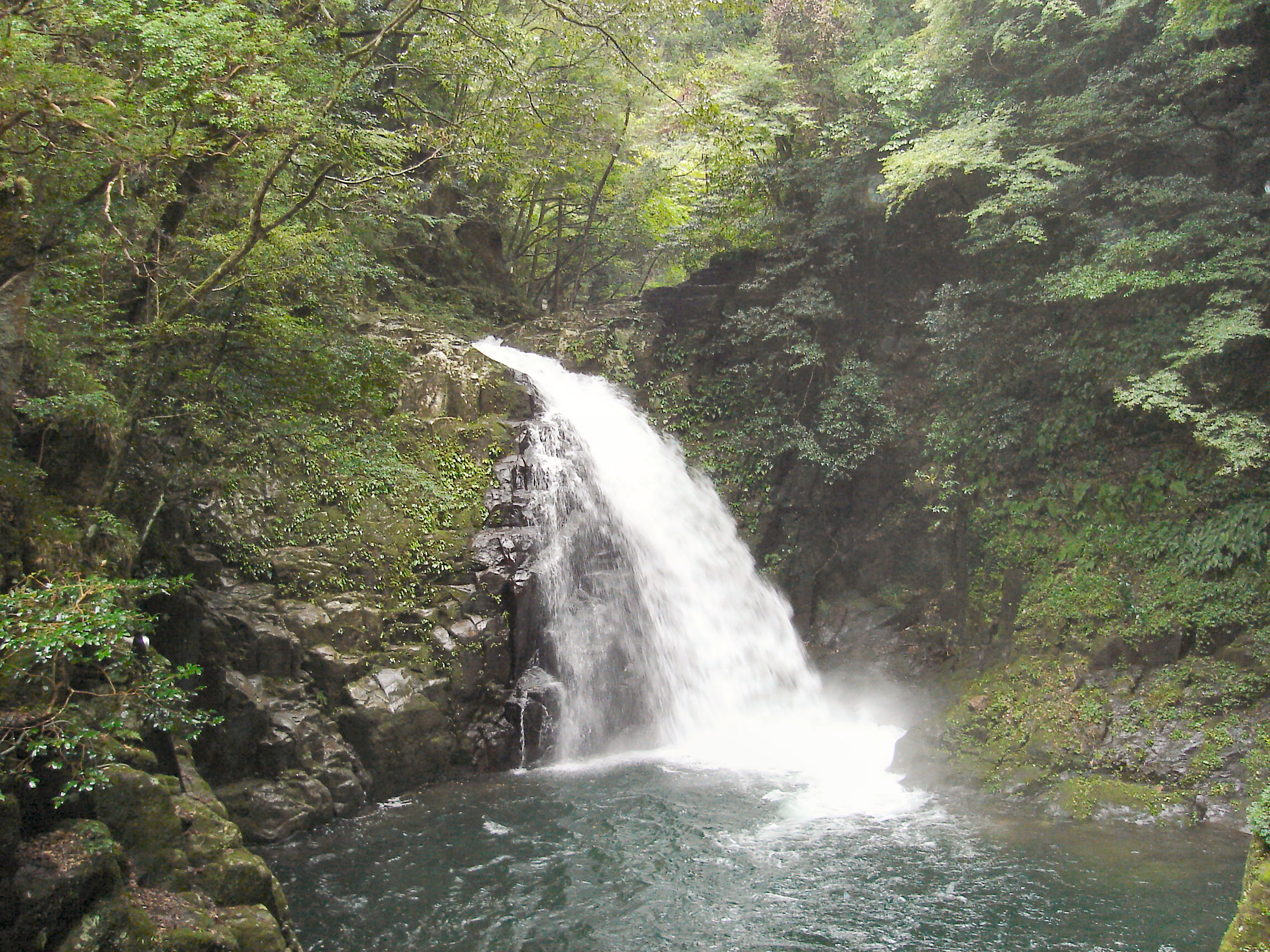
- Akame 48 Falls

- Flag Seal

- Location of Nabari in Mie Prefecture

- Coordinates: 34°37′39.3″N 136°6′30.2″E
- Country: Japan
- Region: Kansai
- Prefecture: Mie
- First official recorded: 672 AD
- Town settled: April 1, 1889
- City settled: March 31, 1954

Government
  - Mayor: Hiroyuki Kitagawa (北川裕之) - from April 2022

Area
  - Total: 129.77 km^{2} (50.10 sq mi)

Population (September 2021)
  - Total: 77,022
  - Density: 593.53/km^{2} (1,537.2/sq mi)
- Time zone: UTC+9 (Japan Standard Time)
- Symbols
  - Tree: Maple
  - Flower: Japanese bellflower
  - Bird: Japanese bush-warbler
- Phone number: 0595-63-7402
- Address: 1 Ichiban-chō, Kōnodai, Nabari-shi, Mie-ken 518-0492
- Website: city.nabari.lg.jp

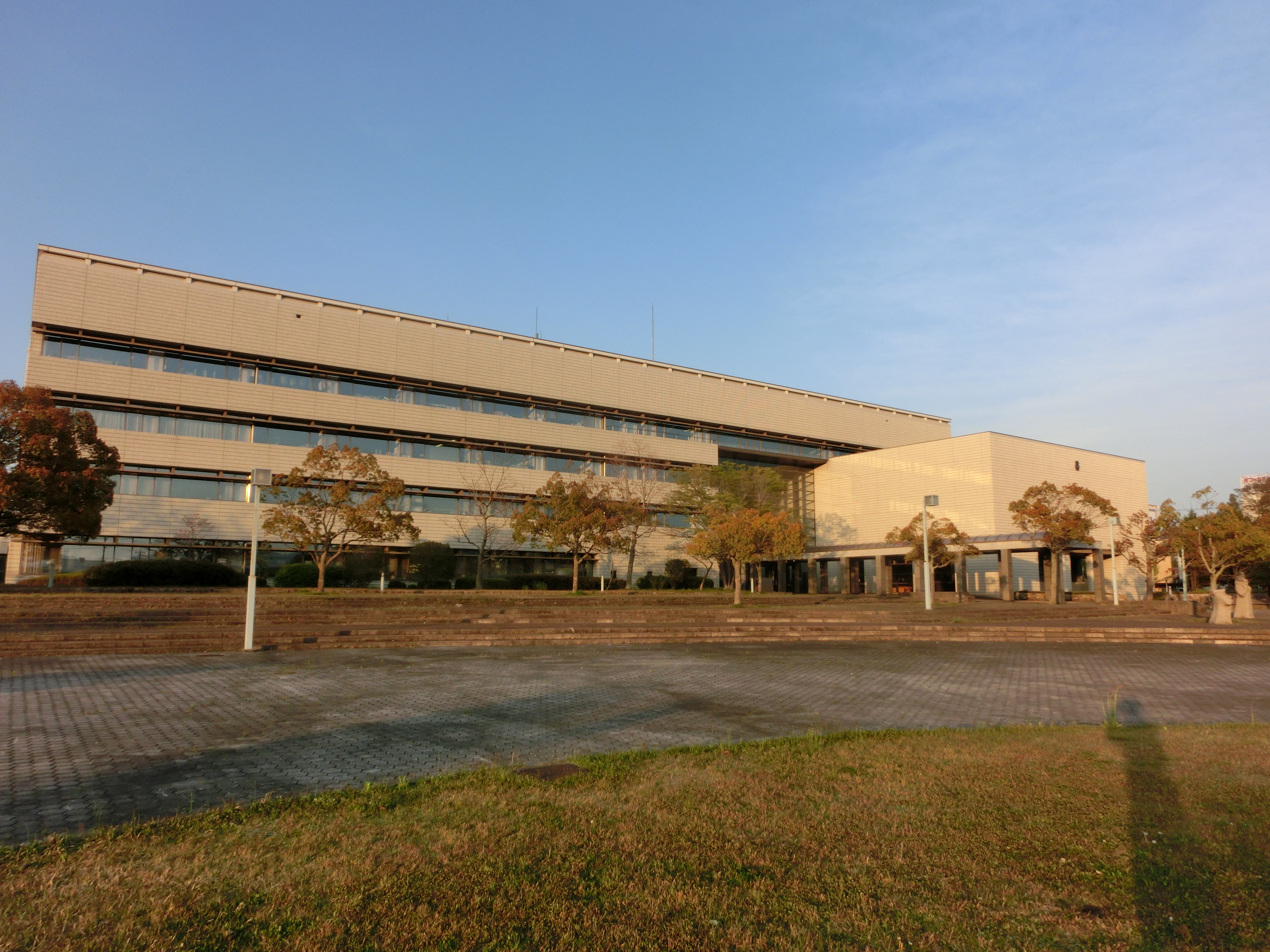
Nabari City Hall

Nabari (名張市, Nabari-shi) is a city located in central Mie Prefecture, Japan, bordering on Nara Prefecture to the west. As of 1 September 2021, the city had an estimated population of 77,022 in 34,658 households and a population density of 590 persons per km^{2}. The total area of the city is 129.77 square kilometres (50.10 sq mi).

== Geography ==
Nabari is located in the hilly Iga region of northwestern Mie Prefecture.

== Neighboring municipalities ==
Mie Prefecture

- Iga
- Tsu

Nara Prefecture

- Soni
- Uda
- Yamazoe

== Climate ==
Nabari has a humid subtropical climate (Köppen Cfa) characterized by warm summers and cool winters with light to no snowfall. The average annual temperature in Nabari is 13.0 °C. The average annual rainfall is 1439 mm with September as the wettest month. The temperatures are highest on average in August, at around 24.7 °C, and lowest in January, at around 1.5 °C.

== Demographics ==
Per Japanese census data, the population of Nabari grew rapidly from the 1950s, but has slightly decreased since the year 2000.

Historical population
Year	Pop.	±%
1960	30,904	—
1970	30,862	−0.1%
1980	44,488	+44.2%
1990	68,933	+54.9%
2000	84,291	+22.3%
2010	80,277	−4.8%

== History ==
The area around Nabari is part of ancient Iga Province, and Nabari developed from the Asuka period as a post station on the Ise Kaidō highway from Asuka and Heijō-kyō to the Ise Grand Shrines. It is mentioned in ancient works, including the Man'yōshū.

Nabari Town in Nabari District in Mie Prefecture was established on April 1, 1889 with the creation of the modern municipalities system. Nabari District was merged with Iga District in 1896 to form Naga District. The city of Nabari was established on March 31, 1954 by the merger of Nabari town with the neighboring villages of Takigawa, Minowa and Kunitsu. Voters rejected a proposal to merge with the neighboring city of Iga in February 2003.

== Government ==
Nabari has a mayor-council form of government with a directly elected mayor and a unicameral city council of 14 members. Nabari contributes two members to the Mie Prefectural Assembly. In terms of national politics, the city is part of Mie 2nd district of the lower house of the Diet of Japan.

== Economy ==
The economy of Nabari is mixed, with agriculture (especially for fruits) and sake production, along with light manufacturing and chemicals production predominant. Due to its proximity to Osaka and Nara, the city is also increasing becoming a bedroom community.

== Education ==
- Kogakkan University – Nabari branch campus
- Nabari has 14 public elementary schools and five public middle schools operated by the city government, and three public high schools operated by then Mie Prefectural Board of Education. The prefecture also operates one special education school for the handicapped.

== Transportation ==
=== Railway ===
Kintetsu Railway – Osaka Line

  - Akameguchi - Nabari - Kikyōgaoka - Mihata

=== Highway ===
- National Route 165
- National Route 368

== Sister cities ==
- Suzhou, Jiangsu, China

== Local attractions ==
- Akame Forty-eight Waterfalls. Asides from being a popular hiking spot, the waterfalls are rumored to be the training location for ninja hundreds of years ago.
- Kuroda House. The Kuroda House was a large manor operated by Todaiji Temple from the Heian to the Muromachi period.
- A statue based on the character of Sonic the Hedgehog can be found near Kanonji Temple, its mysterious nature attracted the attention of online outlets and fans of the franchise

== Notable people from Nabari ==
- Die (musician), guitarist
- Mina Fukui, model
- Michiyo Heike, singer, songwriter
- Kentaro Kuwahara, professional baseball player
- Edogawa Rampo, Author
