= Shiozuka Kofun =

Kofun period burial mound in Japan

- 塩塚古墳 (Japanese)
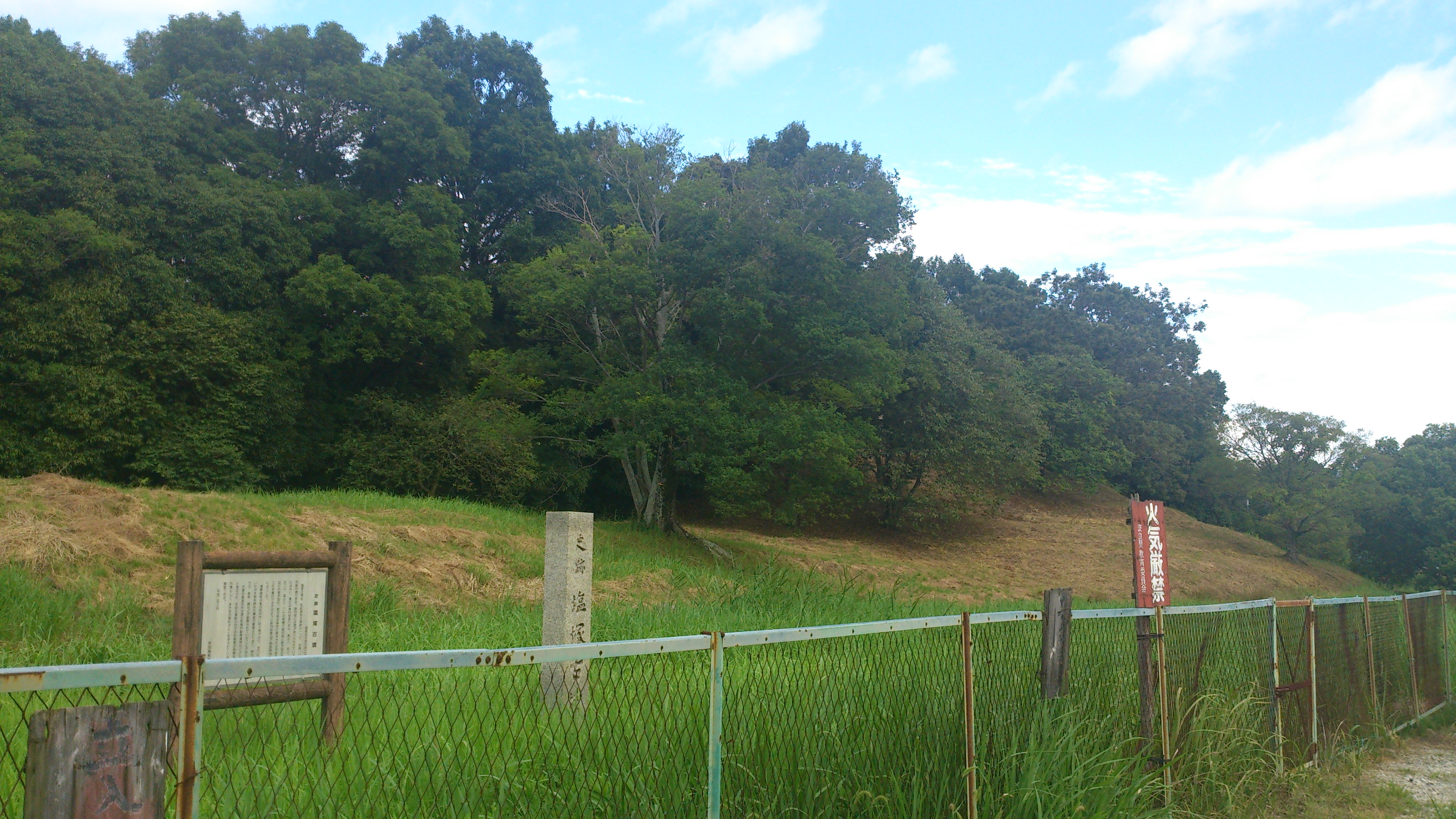
- Shiozuka Kofun

- Shiozuka Kofun Shiozuka Kofun (Japan)
- Interactive map of Shiozuka Kofun
- 34°42′10.9″N 135°47′34.2″E
- Type: Kofun
- Periods: Kofun period
- Location: Nara, Nara, Japan
- Region: Kansai region

History
- Built: c.5th century

Site notes
- Public access: Yes (no facilities)

Shiozuka Kofun (塩塚古墳) is a burial mound, located on the border of the Utahime-chō and Saki-chō neighborhoods of the city of Nara in the Kansai region of Japan. The tumulus was designated a National Historic Site of Japan in 1975.

== Overview ==
The Shiozaki Kofun is located on the Saki Hills, which mark the northern edge of the Nara Basin. It is on the eastern edge of the western group of the Saki Tatenami Kofun cluster, separated from the Saki Ryōzan Kofun and Saki Ishizukayama Kofun, which are in the western group, by a valley that runs north-to-south. There are many medium-sized tumuli in the Saki Tatenami Tomb Group, including the Emontomaruzuka Kofun (45m), Oseyama Kofun (50m), Saki Hyōtanyama Kofun (96m), and Nekozuka Kofun (110m), in the vicinity. The tumulus was a zenpō-kōen-fun (前方後円墳), which is shaped like a keyhole, having one square end and one circular end, when viewed from above, but in 1956 was partially leveled for use as an orchard. Archaeological excavations were conducted by the Kashihara Archaeological Institute of Nara Prefecture, focusing on the posterior circular mound. In 1973, there was a plan to level the mound and develop it as well, but thanks to the efforts of the Nara Prefectural Board of Education, the landowner agreed to preserve it, and in 1975 it was designated a national historic site.

The tumulus measured 105 meters in length, with the posterior circular portion 70 meters in diameter and nine meters high. The anterior rectangular portion was 55 meters in width at the front and 1.5 meters high. The anterior portion is unusually low and flat compared to the circular portion, and roof tiles from the Nara period have been excavated, so it is possible that this portion of the tumulus was leveled and a building was constructed there as far back as the Nara period. Maps also indicate that during the Nara period the area was a pine forest garden in the vicinity of Heijō-kyō Palace, and it is thought that the tumulus was incorporated into that site. No haniwa clay figures or fukiishi roofing stones have been found in the investigation of the tumulus, but trench investigations suggest that the mound was built in two levels. There is trace of a moat around the anterior portion, but a horseshoe-shaped ditch exists around the posterior portion, although there is no sign of it having contained water.

The 1956 excavation uncovered a clay coffin with its main axis facing north-and-south. The center of the clay coffin was lost due to grave robbery, but both ends remain, confirming that had a length of 6.80 meters, width of 1.45 meters in the north tapering to 1.30 meters wide in the south. Traces of a wooden coffin were found inside the clay coffin. Most of the grave goods had been lost due to grave robbery, but two iron swords, one iron knife (remnants), four "warabite"-style knives, 15 iron axes, and 9 iron sickles were excavated. This clay coffin was found slightly east of the centerline of the circular mound, indicating that there may be another burial facility located parallel to it.

The tumulus is about a 15-minute walk from Heijō Station on the Kintetsu Kyoto Line.

== See also ==
- List of Historic Sites of Japan (Nara)
