= Nukatabe Kiln Site =

Archaeological site in Japan

Nukatabe Tile Kiln ruins
- 額田部窯跡 (Japanese)
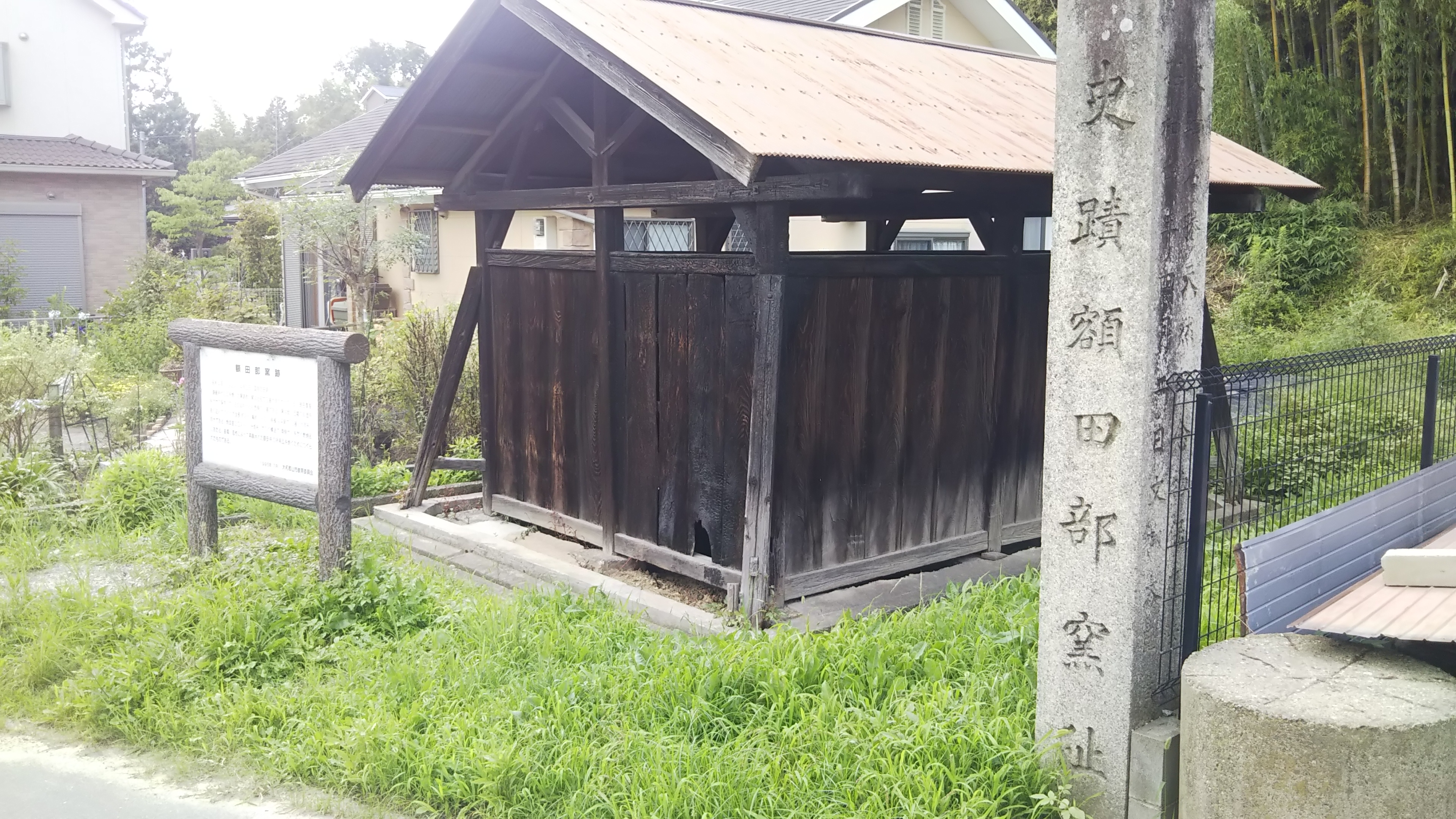
- Nukatabe Tile Kiln ruins

- Kokubu Tile Kiln ruins Nukatabe Kiln Site (Japan)
- Interactive map of Nukatabe Tile Kiln ruins
- 34°36′10″N 135°46′21″E
- Type: kiln ruins
- Periods: Kamakura period
- Location: Yamatokōriyama, Nara, Japan
- Region: Kyushu

Site notes
- Public access: Yes

The Nukatabe Tile Kiln ruins (額田部窯跡, Nukatabe gama ato) is an archaeological site with the ruins of a Kamakura period kiln, located in the Nukatabe Kitamachi neighborhood of the city of Yamatokōriyama, Nara Prefecture Japan. It was designated a National Historic Site of Japan in 1929.

== Overview ==
Kawara (瓦) roof tiles made of fired clay were introduced to Japan from Baekche during the 6th century along with Buddhism. During the 570s under the reign of Emperor Bidatsu, the king of Baekche sent six people to Japan skilled in various aspects of Buddhism, including a temple architect. Initially, tiled roofs were a sign of great wealth and prestige, and used for temple and government buildings. The material had the advantages of great strength and durability, and could also be made at locations around the country wherever clay was available.

The Nukatabe Tile Kiln ruins are located in series of low hills north of the confluence of the Saho River and Hatsuse River in the center of the Nara Basin. The site is 200 meters north of the temple Nukata-ji and was discovered during the excavation of an irrigation pond in 1928. Nukata-ji was founded by Prince Shotoku in the Asuka period and claims to be the predecessor of the great complex of Daian-ji in Heijō-kyō. The temple's influence declined during the Heian period, but it was rebuilt in the late Kamakura period by Eison and Ninsho of Saidai-ji. As excavated remains include flat tiles, round tiles, arabesque eaves tiles, and pottery fragments from the Kamakura period, and the kiln site is believed to be the remains of a tile kiln that was in operation during the reconstruction of that temple. The site consists of the ruins of three kilns. All are roughly the same size and are flat, standing side-by-side about 1.8 meters apart. Each kiln is about 2.3 meters long and 1.27 meters wide, with the firing chamber being about 1.3 meters long and 1 meter wide, and the floor is slightly sloping. The combustion chamber is located on the south side, one step lower than the floor of the firing chamber.

Currently, the westernmost kiln is covered and preserved. The shelter is locked, and visitors must contact the site in advance. It is about 1.2 kilometers east of Hirahata Station on the Kintetsu Railway Kashihara Line.

== See also ==
- List of Historic Sites of Japan (Nara)
