= Kebara temple ruins =

- 毛原廃寺跡 (Japanese)
- Kebara temple ruins Kebara temple ruins (Japan)
- Interactive map of Kebara temple ruins
- 34°38′06.2″N 136°02′30.1″E
- Type: temple ruins
- Periods: Nara period
- Location: Yamazoe, Nara, Japan
- Region: Kansai region

History
- Built: 8th century AD

Site notes
- Public access: Yes (park, museum)

Kebara temple ruins (毛原廃寺跡, Kebara haiji ato) is an archaeological site with the ruins of a Nara period Buddhist temple located in the Kebara neighborhood of the village of Yamazoe, Nara Prefecture, Japan. It was designated as a National Historic Site in 1926, with the area under protection expanded in 2021.

== History ==
The Kebara ruins are located at the foot of a mountain on the left bank of the Kasama River, a tributary of the Nabari River, near the border with Mie Prefecture, at an elevation of about 260 meters. The intricately crafted foundation stones of the main hall, pagoda, inner gate, and south gate indicate that the temple was a large and impressive complex for its remote mountain location; however, it does not appear in any historical documentation and its name and history are all unknown. The land on which it is located is known to have been the property of Tōdai-ji, so it is assumed that this temple was associated with that large national temple.

In 1978, roof tiles excavated from the remains of the Iwaya tile kiln, located on a hillside bordering the right bank of the Nabari River, 2.7 kilometers northeast of the temple ruins, were found to be identical to those found at the temple ruins, indicating that this was the kiln associated with that temple. The kiln is a flat kiln, with a 1.5 meter wide and 1.2 meter deep firing chamber, with seven flame ducts that connect to three chimneys that rise diagonally upward from the back wall. The chimneys were made of flat tiles stacked one above the other. The excavated roof tiles were a round roof tile with a compound eight-petaled lotus pattern and a flat roof tile with a balanced arabesque pattern. The kiln ruins were subsequently added to the National Historic Site designation.

The site is approximately 33.5 kilometers east of Tenri Station on the JR West Man-yō Mahoroba Line.

== See also ==
- List of Historic Sites of Japan (Nara)
