= Kose-dera =

Archaeological site in Japan

Kose-dera ruins
- 巨勢寺跡 (Japanese)
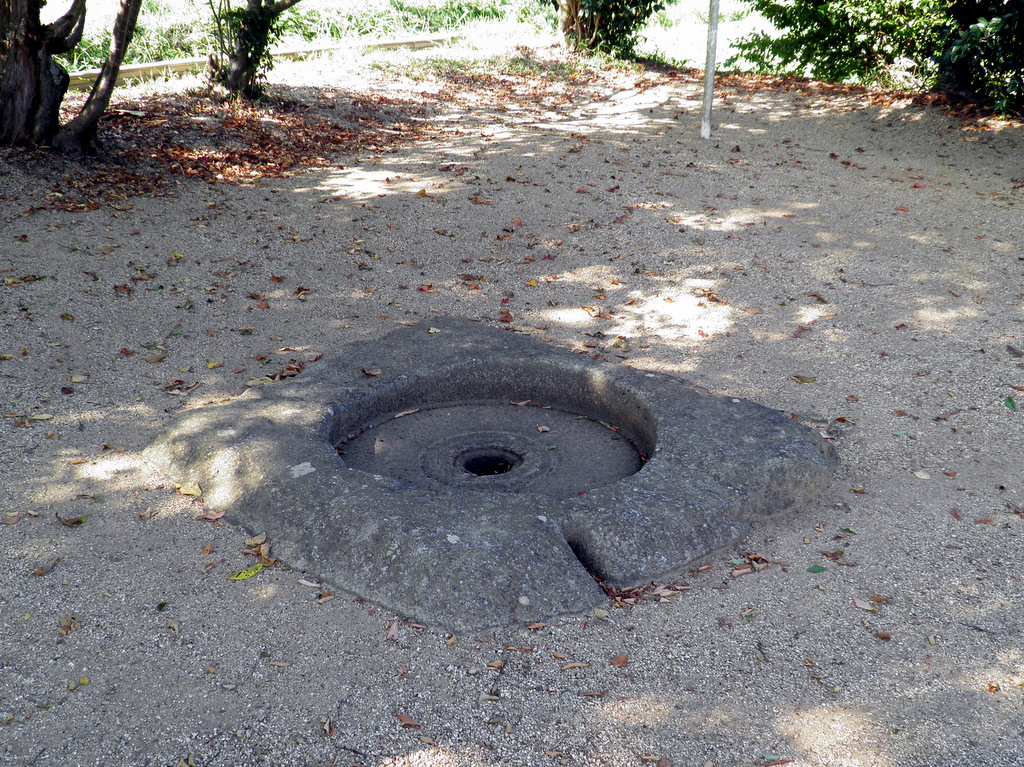
- Pagoda foundation at ruins of Kose-dera

- Kose-dera ruins Kose-dera (Japan)
- Interactive map of Kose-dera ruins
- 34°25′31.3″N 135°45′9.8″E
- Type: temple ruins
- Periods: Asuka period
- Location: Gose, Nara, Japan
- Region: Kansai region

History
- Built: c7th century AD

Site notes
- Public access: Yes

Kose-dera ruins (巨勢寺跡, Kose-dera ato) is an archaeological site with the ruins of an Asuka period Buddhist temple located in the Furuse neighborhood of the city of Gose, Nara, Japan. The ruins of the foundation of a Pagoda were designated a National Historic Site in 1927.

== History ==
Kose-dera was located in Kose Valley, with the Soga River to the east and mountains to the west. excavated roof tiles date from the late Asuka period, and it is believed that to have been a large temple built as the bodaiji of the ancient powerful Kose clan, whose base was in this area. The temple's name appears in the Nihon Shoki in an entry for August 686, stating that it had been granted a fief of 200 households for its upkeep. The temple also appears in two poems in the Man'yōshū, both of which praise its camellia blossoms. Documents indicate that the temple continued to exist as a branch temple of Kofuku-ji during Nara and Heian period. However, a document owned by Kasuga Taisha dated July 1308 mentions a donation of rice fields from the betto of the abandoned Kose-dera, indicates that the temple had fallen into ruins by the end of the Kamakura period.

At present, the temple consists of a modern small chapel to Dainichi Nyorai and the remains of the foundations of a pagoda. This is a 1.8m-high earthen platform with core stone of the pagoda, and several foundation stones. The core stone is an elaborately carved square piece of granite measuring 1.6 meters on each side, with a cylindrical hole 82-cm in diameter and 12-cm deep, containing a relic hole and triple concentric circular grooves for draining water. Excavations carried out from 1987 in conjunction with the construction of a bypass on Japan National Route 309 have uncovered traces of the foundations of the Lecture Hall and corridor with a tiled base to the west of the remains of the tower, an embankment marking the western limit of the temple grounds, two flagpole supports behind the Lecture Hall, as well as two noborigama-style tile kiln and the remains of a Heian period temple bell casting site. The roof tiles excavated range from the Asuka period to the Heian period, including round eaves tiles with single-petal eight-leaf lotus pattern and flat eaves tiles with double arc and biased arabesque patterns. The layout of the temple appeared to be in the style of Hōryū-ji in Ikaruga, with the temple grounds extending for about 50 meters north-to-south and 100 meters east-to-west. The site is about a 10-minute walk from Yoshinoguchi Station on the JR West Wakayama Line, whose tracks diagonally bisect the site of the temple.

== See also ==
- List of Historic Sites of Japan (Nara)
