= Asuka Mizuochi Site =

Water clock in Japan

- 飛鳥水落遺跡 (Japanese)
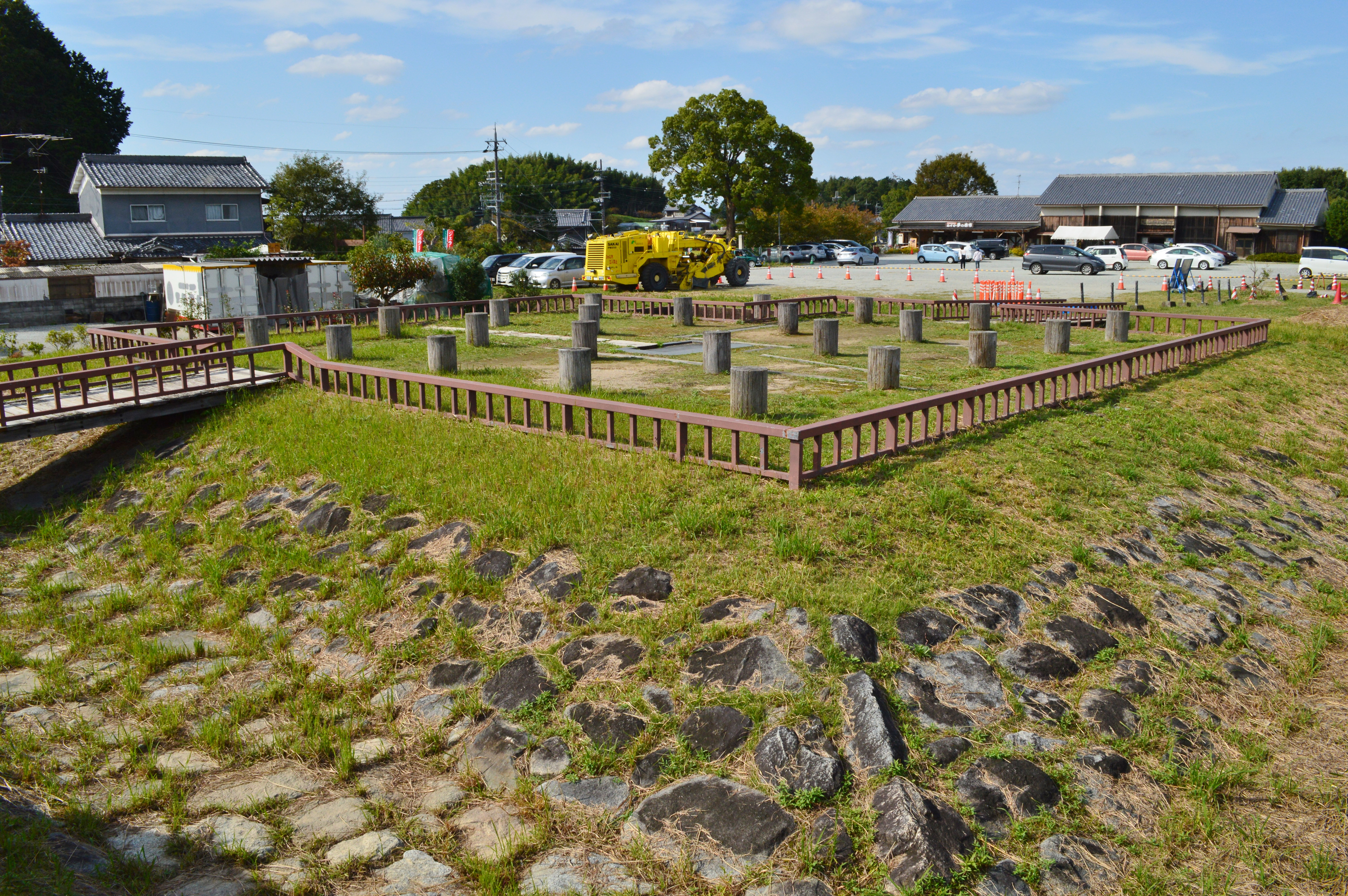
- Asuka Mizuochi Site

- Asuka Mizuochi Site Asuka Mizuochi Site (Japan)
- 34°28′49.2″N 135°49′5.8″E
- Periods: Asuka period
- Location: Asuka, Nara, Japan
- Region: Kansai region

History
- Built: c.660 AD

Site notes
- Public access: Yes (no facilities)
- National Historic Site of Japan

The Asuka Mizuochi Site (飛鳥水落遺跡, Asuka Mizuochi iseki) was a water clock located in Asuka in the Kansai region of Japan during the Asuka period. Its ruins were designated a National Historic Site of Japan in 1976 with the area under protection expanded in 1982.

== Overview ==
A water clock or clepsydra is a timepiece by which time is measured by the regulated flow of liquid into (inflow type) or out from (outflow type) a vessel, and where the amount of liquid can then be measured. Water clocks are one of the oldest time-measuring instruments. In ancient China, as well as throughout East Asia, water clocks were very important in the study of astronomy and astrology. The oldest written reference dates the use of the water clock in China to the 6th century BC.

The one at Asuka is located on the east bank of the Asuka River, with the Buddhist temple of Asuka-dera to the southeast. The site was discovered in 1972 during a preliminary survey for the construction of a private house, and a full-scale archaeological excavation was conducted from 1981 onwards. As a result, the size and nature of the building became clear, and it was confirmed that this place was the water clock and its attached facilities mentioned in the Nihon Shoki. According to this account, it was constructed by Prince Nakano Ōe during the 6th year of the reign of Empress Saimei (660 AD).

The remains consist of the foundations of a tower-like building and associated water facilities, as well as the remains of surrounding post-hole structures. The tower-like building is a square plan measuring four bays (approximately 11 meters) on each side, built on a foundation of piled-up earth and covered with stones, and is a pillar-like building with a total of 24 pillars, excluding the central part. The foundation stones are set one meter underground below the foundation, and the pillars are fitted into circular recesses with a diameter of 40-centimeters. Furthermore, stone beams are placed between each foundation stone, and the surrounding area is solidified with foundation soil. Meanwhile, one meter below the foundation in the center of the building, there were traces of a 1.65 x 0.85 meter black lacquered wooden box placed on a granite cut stone as a base, and inside the foundation there were wooden gutters, a pit, and a very thin trumpet-shaped copper pipe attached above the wooden gutters. It is known that there was a wooden gutter culvert under the foundation that ran from the east toward the center of the building, and another copper pipe was also confirmed to have been installed on the west side of the wooden box to drain any water that flowed in. Based on these excavation findings, it is believed that the structure was such that the water introduced from the wooden gutter was siphoned up to the top of the tower using a trumpet-shaped copper pipe, and then flowed down into a black lacquered wooden box. The building is surrounded on all four sides by a long corridor-like building with corner towers at the corners, and it is assumed that a bell and drum was installed on the second floor of the tower-like building to tell the time.

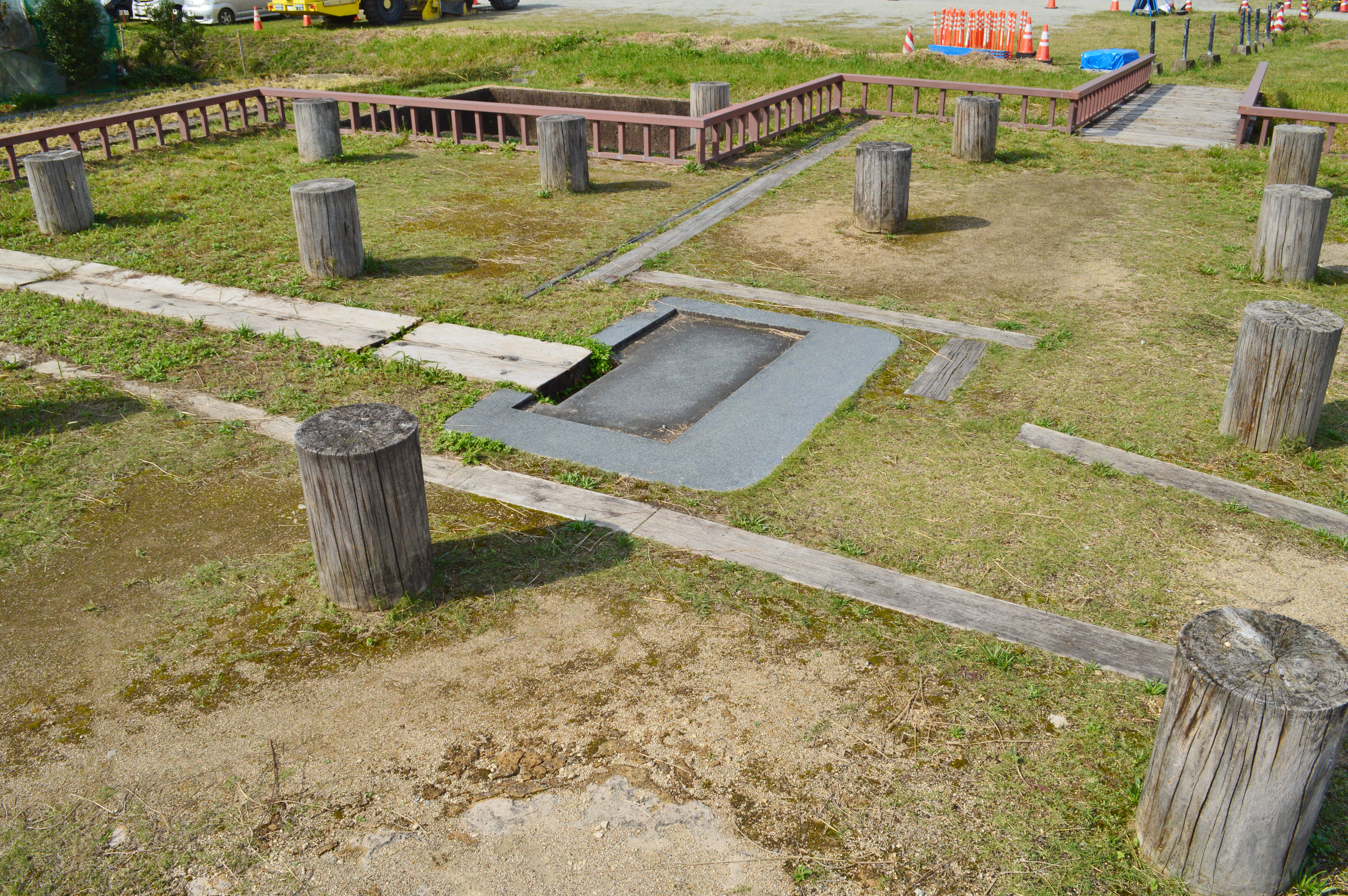
Signs showing remains of wooden water clock receiving box

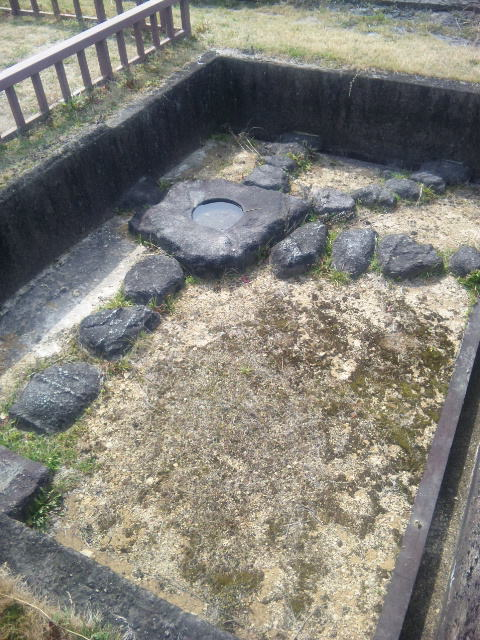
Foundation stones

== See also ==
- List of Historic Sites of Japan (Nara)

== Sources ==
- Needham, Joseph (2000). Science & Civilisation in China: Volume 4, Physics and Physical Technology, Part 2, Mechanical Engineering. Cambridge University Press. ISBN 0-521-05803-1. OCLC 153247141.
- Turner, Anthony J. (1984). The Time Museum. Vol. I: Time Measuring Instruments, Part 3: Water-clocks, Sand-glasses, Fire-clocks. Rockford, IL: The Museum. ISBN 0-912947-01-2. OCLC 159866762.
