= Uguisuzuka Kofun =

Kofun period burial mound in Japan

- 鶯塚古墳 (Japanese)
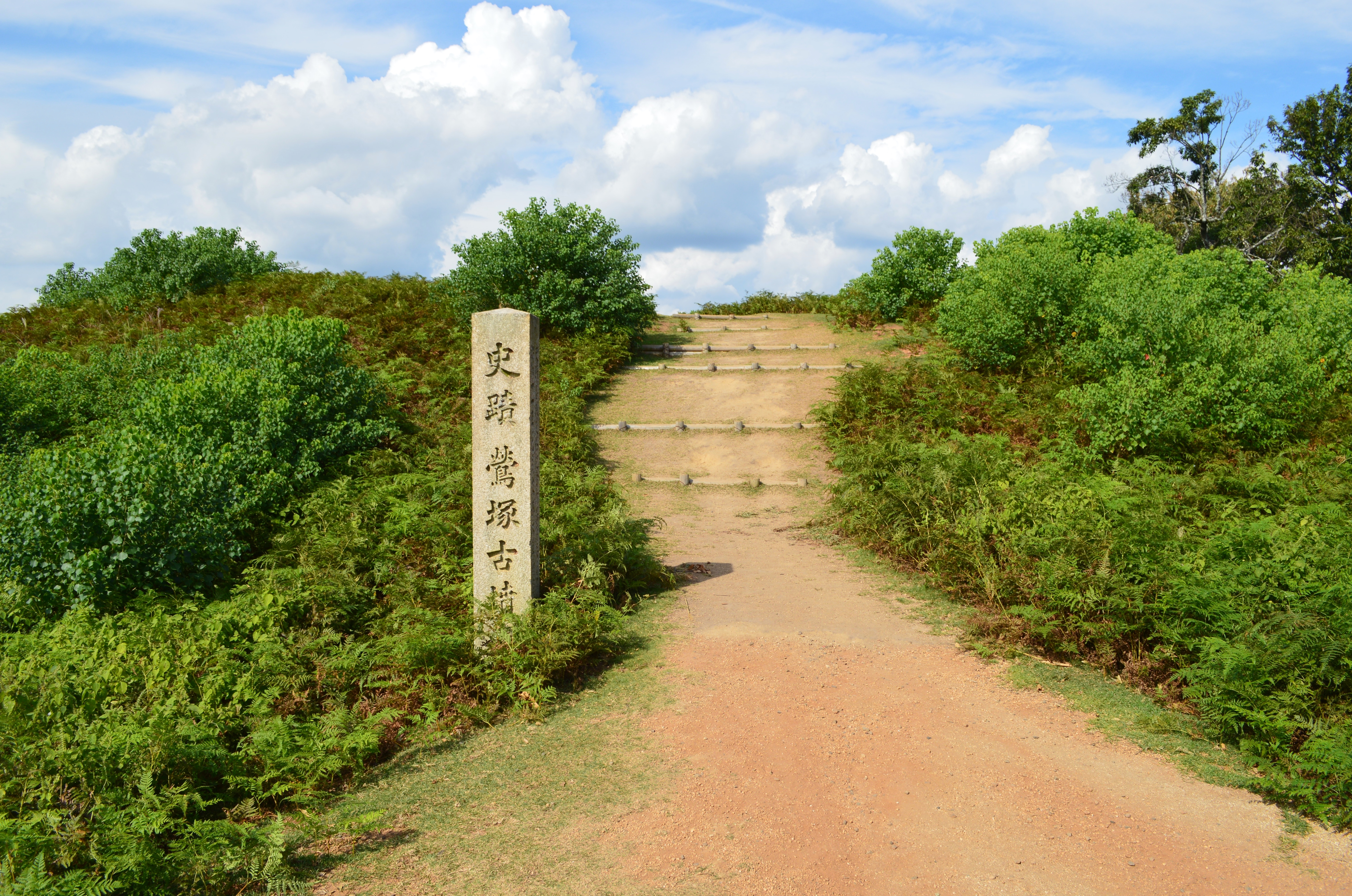
- Uguisuzuka Kofun

- Uguisuzuka Kofun Uguisuzuka Kofun (Japan)
- Interactive map of Uguisuzuka Kofun
- 34°41′27.3″N 135°51′15.25″E
- Type: Kofun
- Periods: Kofun period
- Location: Nara, Nara, Japan
- Region: Kansai region

History
- Built: c.5th century

Site notes
- Public access: Yes (no facilities)

Uguisuzuka Kofun (鶯塚古墳) is a Kofun period burial mound, located in the Kasugano neighborhood of the city of Nara in the Kansai region of Japan. The tumulus was designated a National Historic Site of Japan in 1936.

== Overview ==
Uguisuzuka Kofun is a large tumulus built on the summit of Mount Wakakusa (342 meters above sea level) in the northeastern suburbs of Nara city, northern Nara Prefecture. The name "Uguisuzuka" comes from a legend that identifies this tumulus with the "Uguisu no Misasagi" in Sei Shonagon's "The Pillow Book". The tumulus is a zenpō-kōen-fun (前方後円墳), which is shaped like a keyhole, having one square end and one circular end, when viewed from above. It is orientated to the south-southwest, and appears to be built in three tiers in the posterior circular part and two tiers in the anterior rectangular part. Its overall length is 103 meters, with a circular mound diameter of 61 meter, and rectangular front width of approximately 50 meters. On the outside of the tumulus, thick fukiishi roofing stones made of crushed stone can be seen all over the surface, and rows of cylindrical haniwa and figurative haniwa (house-shaped, boat-shaped, and lid-shaped haniwa) have been discovered. In addition, an island-like facility can be seen in front of the front part. Surveys have been conducted so far, but no archaeological excavations have been conducted. The burial facility is unclear, but a small bronze mirror with a floral pattern and an axe-shaped stone object made of talc have been excavated from the mound, which are thought to be grave goods. A stone monument was erected on the top of the rear mound in 1733, with the inscription "Uguisuzuka", by a monk of Tōdai-ji, which owned the land that this tumulus was built on during the Edo period.

A small square hōfun (方墳) tumulus and two small circular enpun (円墳) tumuli remain in the front of the mound, which are thought to be baizuka secondary tombs. They are estimated to have been built around the latter half of the early Kofun period.

The tumulus is maintained and repaired as part of Nara Park, with improvements such as laying grass, installing protective fences, signposts, and information boards. It is about a 30-minute walk from Kintetsu Nara Station on the Kintetsu Nara Line.

== See also ==
- List of Historic Sites of Japan (Nara)
