= Kanmaki Kudo Kofun Cluster =

Kofun period burial mound cluster in Japan

- 上牧久渡古墳群 (Japanese)
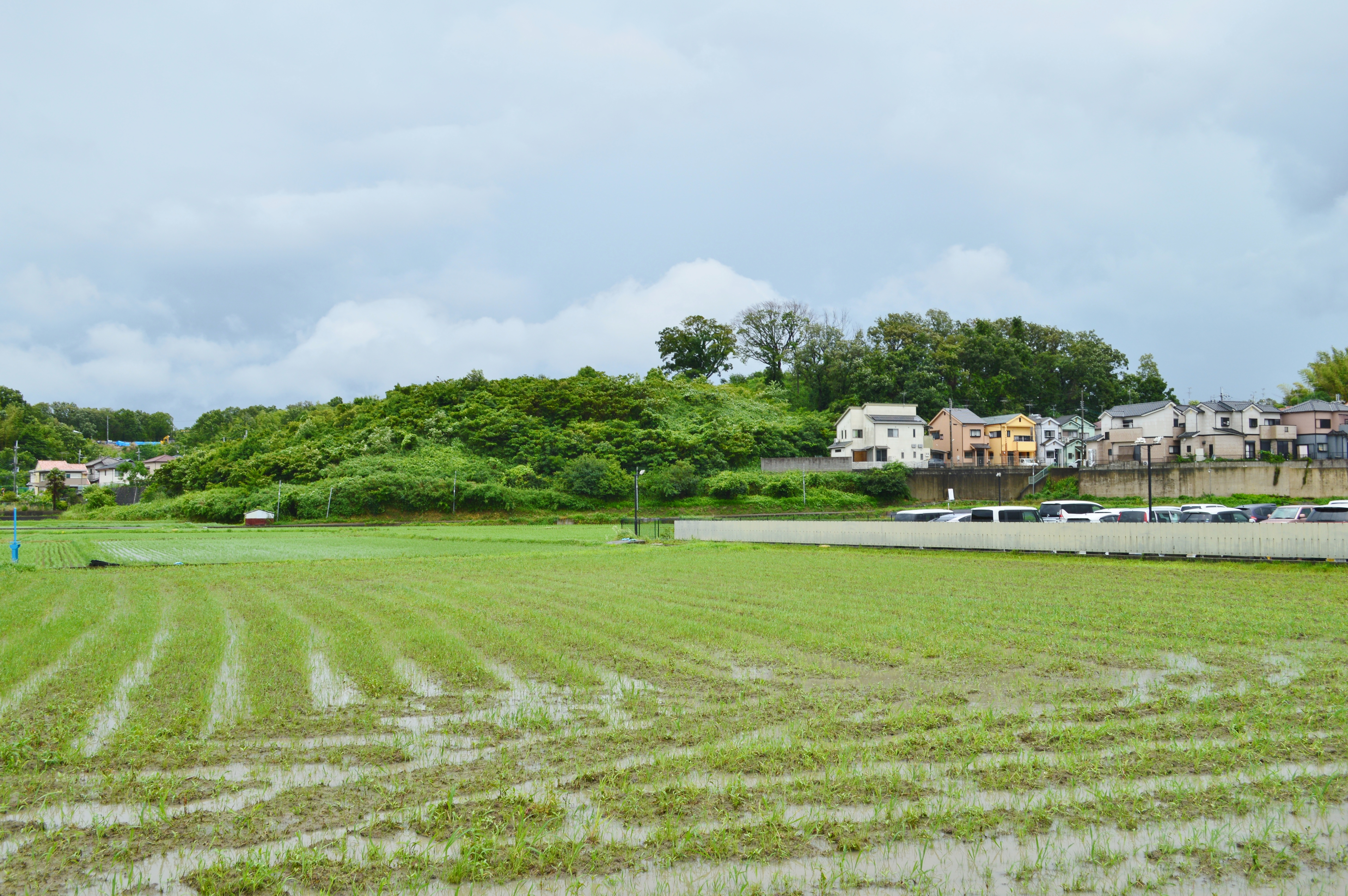
- 上牧久渡古墳群

- 上牧久渡古墳群 Kanmaki Kudo Kofun Cluster (Japan)
- Interactive map of Kanmaki Kudo Kofun Cluster
- 34°33′06″N 135°42′34″E
- Type: Kofun
- Periods: Kofun period
- Location: Kanmaki, Nara, Japan
- Region: Kansai region

Site notes
- Public access: Yes (no facilities)

Kanmaki Kudo Kofun cluster (上牧久渡古墳群) is a group of eight burial mounds, located in the Kanmaki neighborhood of the town of Kanmaki, Nara prefecture in the Kansai region of Japan. The tumulus cluster was designated a National Historic Site of Japan in 2015.

== Overview ==
The Kanmaki Kudo Kofun cluster is located on an independent hill about 70 meters above sea level at the southwestern end of the Umami Hills in the western Nara Basin. It consists of at least eight tombs, including one keyhole-shaped tumulus (Kofun No. 1), six circular Kofun (Kofun No. 2, 4–8), and one square Kofun (Kofun No. 3).

Of the group of tumuli, Kofun No. 1 is a zenpō-kōen-fun (前方後円墳), which is shaped like a keyhole, having one square end and one circular end, when viewed from above. Details are unclear because the tumulus was significantly damaged in modern times, but it is estimated to have been built around the early Kofun period. The mound has been confirmed to have a long axis of approximately 33 meters and a short axis of approximately 28 meters. Based on the topography, it is possible that it was originally approximately 60 meters long.

The square tumulus, a hōfun (方墳) (Kofun No. 3), is located at the tip of the ridge on the northern side of the hill and is thought to have a mound measuring about 15 meters on each side. Three composite wooden coffins were confirmed in the burial chamber, and from the composite wooden coffin located in the center of the mound, a Chinese pictorial band divine beast bronze mirror was excavated, as well as fragments of an iron spear, iron sword, iron arrowhead, and a Haji ware pottery jar. Based on these artifacts, it is believed to have been built in the mid-3rd century. The mirror is the same as the one excavated at the east chamber of the Izumi Koganezuka Kofun in Osaka Prefecture. It is also considered to be one of the oldest kofun in the central-western Nara Basin, and is notable for its different size, structure, and location from the Yamato Kofun Group and Yanagimoto Kofun Group in the plains of the southeastern Nara Basin, which was the center of the Yamato kingship in the Kinai region at the time. The excavated items were designated a Nara Prefectural Tangible Cultural Property in 2016.

The other tumuli in the cluster are enpun (円墳)-style circular mounds dating from the late 6th century to the mid-7th century.

The site is about 1.5 kilometers north of Kashiba Station on the JR West Wakayama Line.

== See also ==
- List of Historic Sites of Japan (Nara)
