= Yōraku Kofun Cluster =

Kofun period keyhole-shaped burial mound in Japan

- 与楽古墳群 (Japanese)
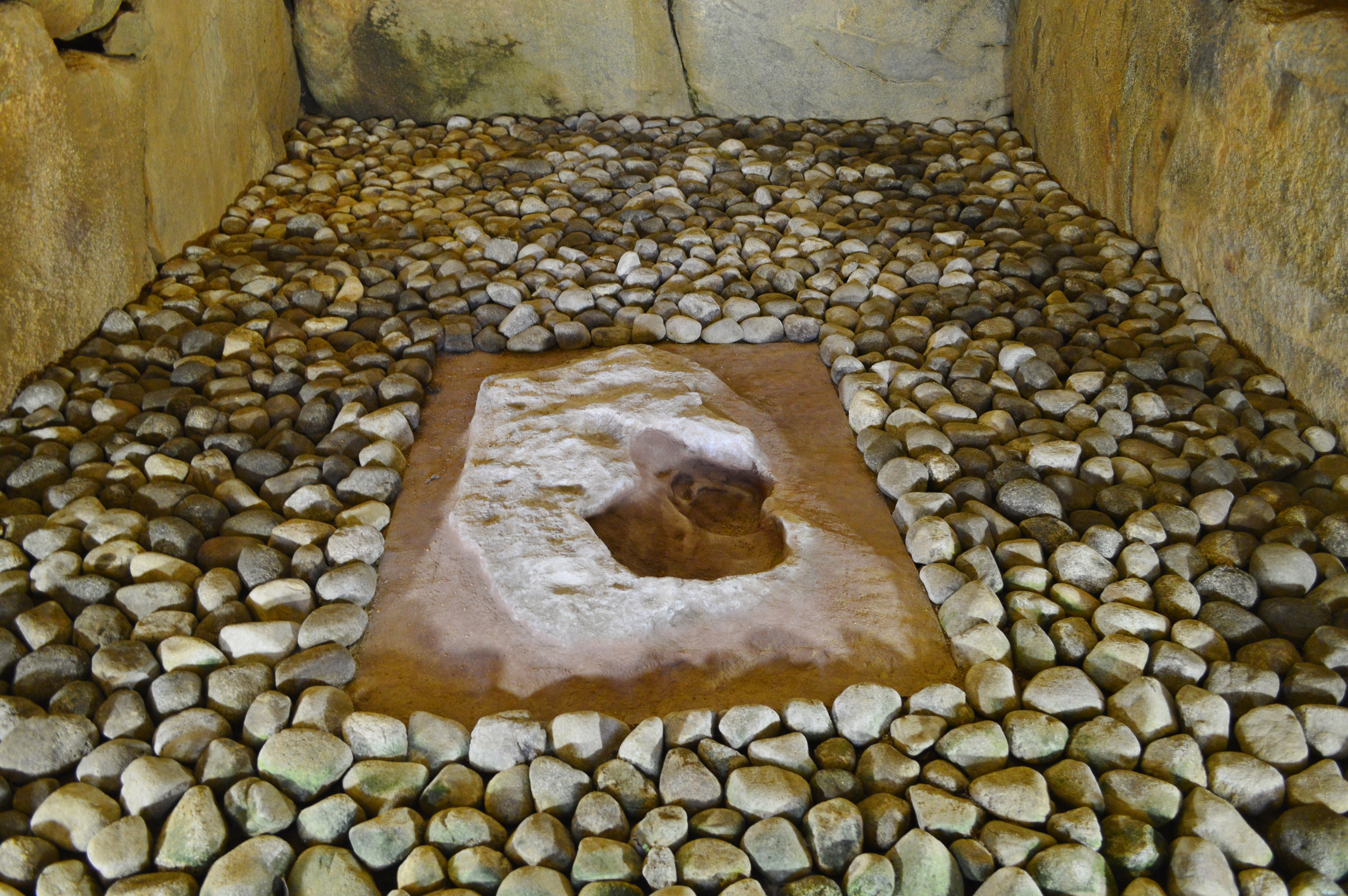
- Yōraku Kanjo Kofun

- Yōraku Kofun Cluster Yōraku Kofun Cluster (Japan)
- Interactive map of Yōraku Kofun Cluster
- 34°27′58″N 135°46′47″E
- Type: Kofun
- Periods: Kofun period
- Location: Takatori, Nara, Japan
- Region: Kansai region

History
- Built: c.4th century

Site notes
- Public access: Yes (no facilities)

The Yōraku Kofun Cluster (与楽古墳群) is a group of Kofun period burial mounds located in the town of Takatori, Nara Prefecture, Japan. It consists of over 100 kofun which are lined up from north-to-south, along a ridge. Excavations have been carried out since 2002. The tumuli are estimated to have been built in the late to final stages of the Kofun period, around the end of the 6th century to the early 7th century, and post-interments up to the beginning of the 8th century have been confirmed. The three largest tumuli, Yoraku Kankozuka Tomb, Yoraku Kanjo Tomb, and Terasaki Shirakabezuka Tomb, are assumed to be the tombs of an toraijin immigrant clan, possibly the Yamato no Aya clan, based on the discovery of miniature rice cooker pottery and dome-shaped stone burial chambers. Archaeological excavations were carried out from 1996 to 2002. These three tumuli were collectively been designated a National Historic Site of Japan in 2013.

== Yōraku Kansuzuka Kofun ==
The Yōraku Kansuzuka Kofun (与楽鑵子塚古墳) is an empun (円墳)-style circular tumulus located on the southwest hill of Mount Kaibuki (34°27′58″N 135°46′47″E). It has a diameter of 28 meters and height of 9 meters. A horizontal-entry stone burial chamber opening to the south has been confirmed. The burial chamber is 4.15 meters long, 3.15 meters wide, and over 4.5 meters high. The entrance passage is over 2 meters long, 1.4 meters wide, and over 1.4 meters high. No archaeological excavation has been conducted, so no grave goods have been found, but from the style of the tumulus, is thought to have been built early in the second half of the 6th century.

== Yōraku Kanjo Kofun ==
The Yōraku Kanjo Kofun (与楽カンジョ古墳) is an hofun (方墳)-style square tumulus located at the tip of a ridge extending south from the Kaibukiyama Hills on the southern edge of the Nara Basin (34°27′53.64″N 135°46′48″E). It is 36 meters on each side and has height of ten meters. The tumulus is constructed of two tiers. A horizontal-entry stone burial chamber opening to the south has been confirmed. The burial chamber is large, measuring 11.8 meters in total length, with a dome-shaped ceiling and a particularly high stone chamber height of 5.3 meters, making it the largest in Nara Prefecture. It is constructed of huge diorite stones, with the relatively flat surface facing the interior of the chamber. The left side wall is built in five layers, and the right wall in four layers. The four walls are brought inward to form a dome-shaped ceiling. The ceiling stone is a single monolith. The floor of the main chamber is covered with gravel. Among the grave goods found in the stone chamber were gilt bronze earrings, silver rings, unknown iron products, whetstones, Sue ware, and Haji ware pottery (including miniature pottery handles). It is estimated to have been built in the late to final stages of the Kofun period, around the end of the 6th century to the early 7th century. Furthermore, during a survey in 2015, pottery fragments dating to the late 7th century to early 8th century were unearthed under the stone closing the entrance to the stone chamber. As the construction of the burial mound is believed to have occurred between the late 6th century and the early 7th century, it is believed that a second burial took place around 100 years later. Currently, the site has been renovated and is open to the public, but access to the interior of the burial chamber is restricted.

== Terasaki Shirakabezuka Kofun ==
The Terasaki Shirakabezuka Kofun (寺崎白壁塚古墳) is a hofun (方墳)-style trapezoidal (or possibly octagonal) tumulus located at the tip of a ridge extending south from the Kaibukiyama Hills on the southern edge of the Nara Basin (34°28′6.50″N 135°46′37.57″E). It is 35 meters on the south side, 20 meters on the north side, 28 meters north-to-south, and nine meters high and is in two tiers. The south side has a two-tiered terrace measuring 15 meters east-to- west and 10 meters north-to-south. The tumulus is surrounded by a trench six meters wide and two meters deep. The souther side A horizontal-entry stone burial chamber opening to the south has been confirmed. However, it has been robbed in antiquity, and only a few iron nails and Haji ware flat-bottomed jars have been found. The construction is estimated to have been around the mid-7th century. Currently, the site is open to the public under maintenance, but access to the stone coffin is restricted.

== Gallery ==
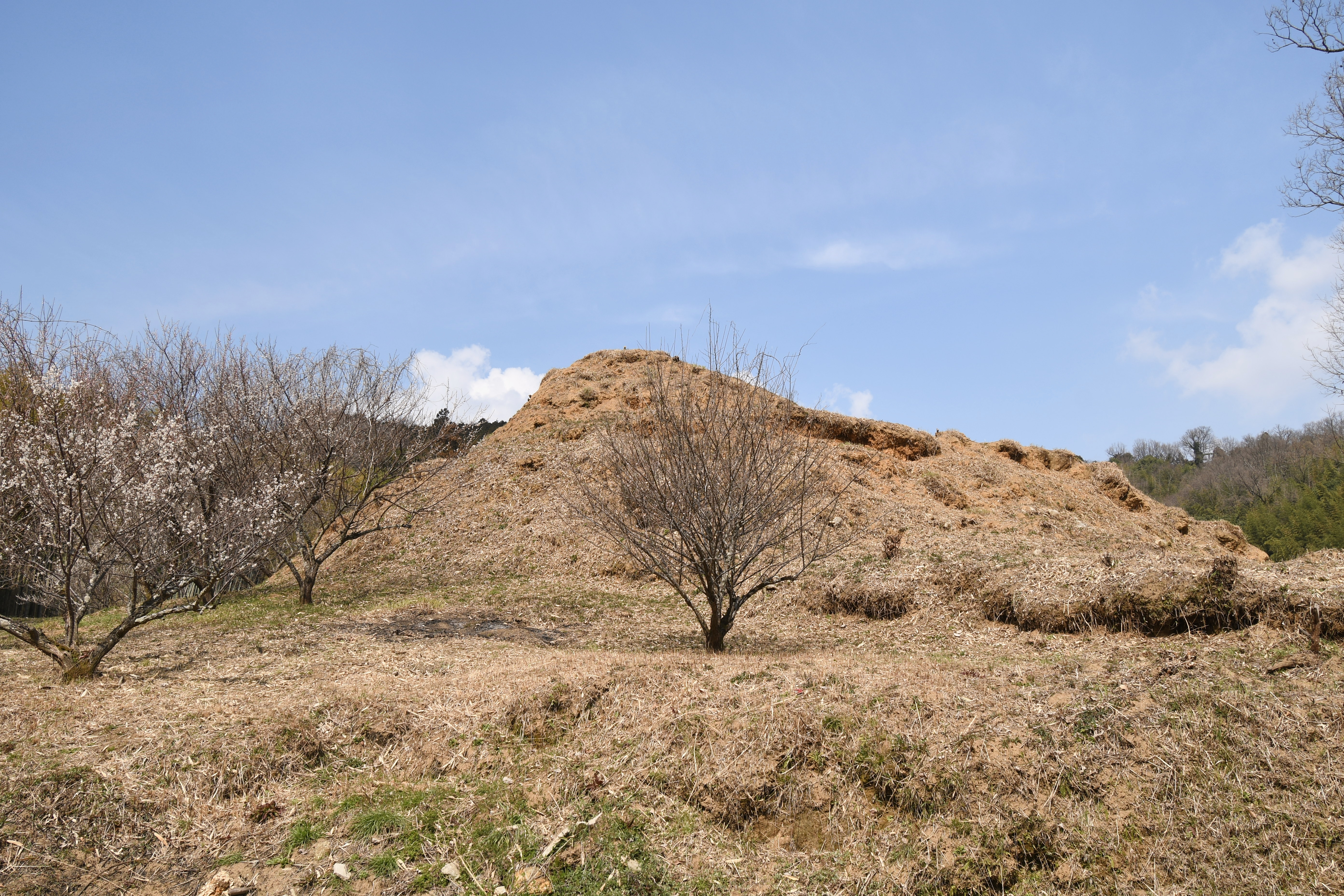
Yōraku Kansuzuka Kofun

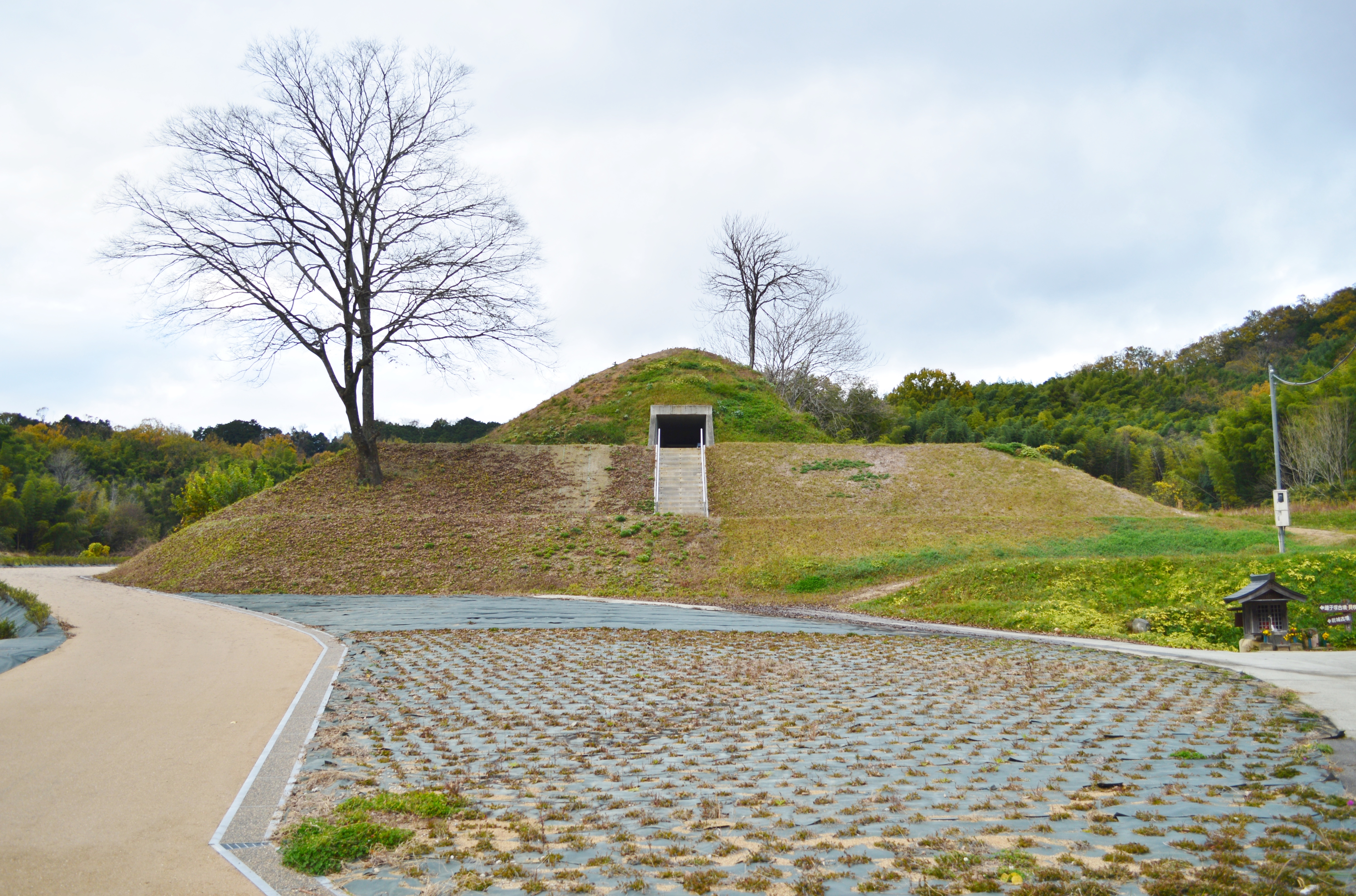
Yōraku Kanjo Kofun

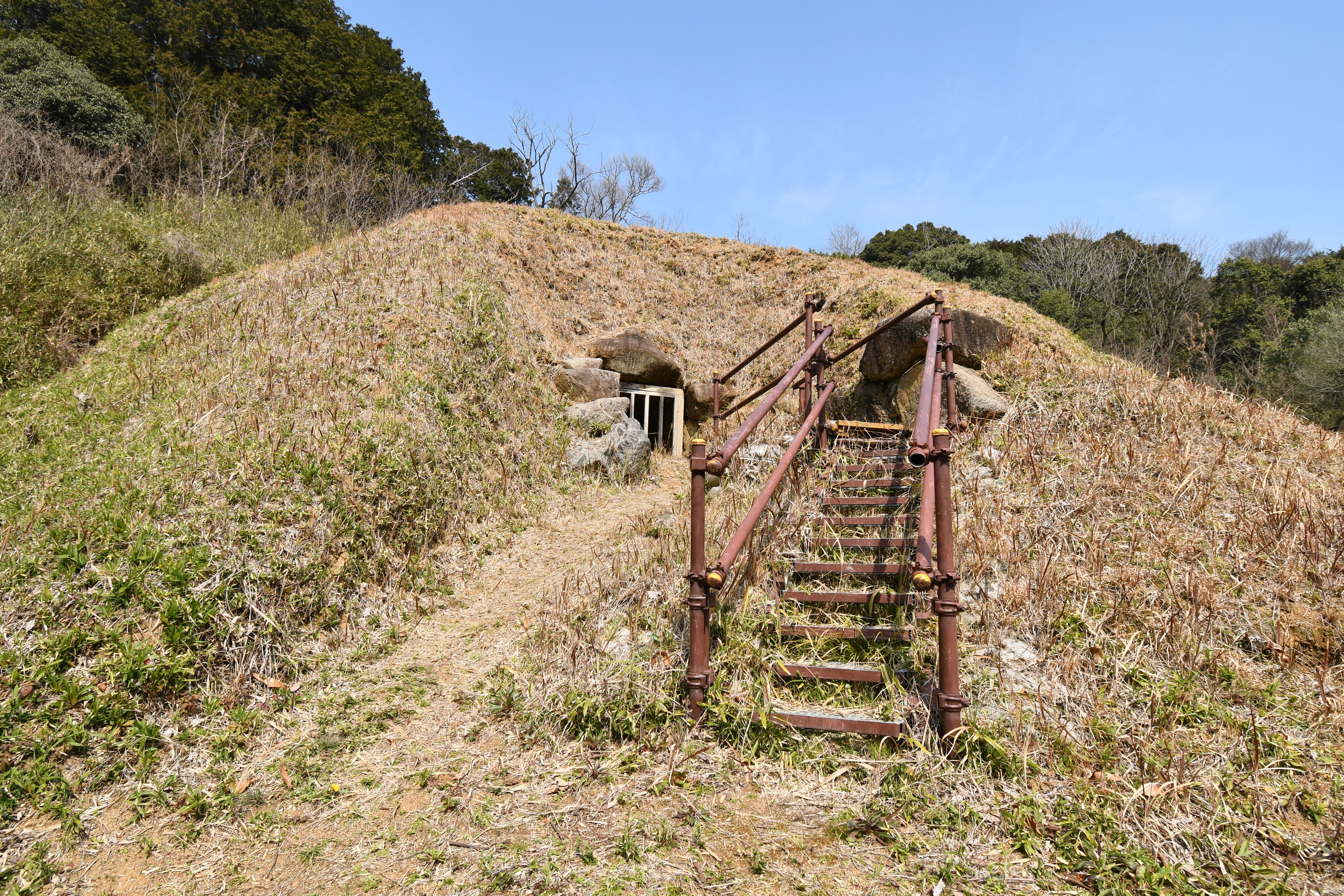
Terasaki Shirakabezuka Kofun

== See also ==
- List of Historic Sites of Japan (Nara)
