= Futazuka Kofun (Katsuragi) =

Kofun period burial mound in Japan

- 二塚古墳 (Japanese)
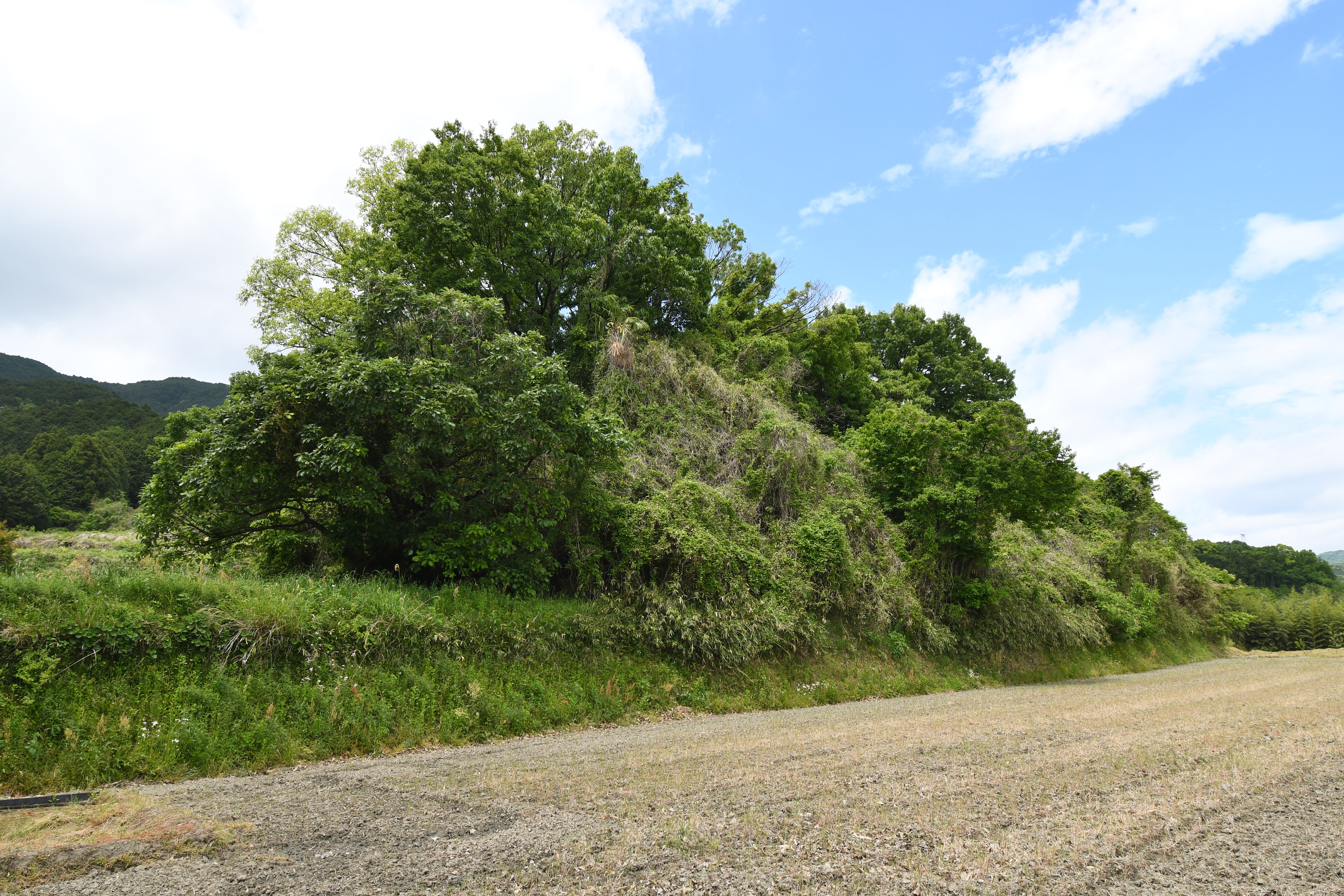
- Futazuka Kofun

- Futazuka Kofun Futazuka Kofun (Katsuragi) (Japan)
- 34°29′14″N 135°42′2″E
- Type: Kofun
- Periods: Kofun period
- Location: Katsuragi, Nara, Japan
- Region: Kansai region

History
- Built: c.6th century

Site notes
- Public access: Yes (park)
- National Historic Site of Japan

Futazuka Kofun (二塚古墳) is a Kofun period burial mound, located in the Teraguchi neighborhood of the city of Katsuragi, Nara in the Kansai region of Japan. The tumulus was designated a National Historic Site of Japan in 1972 .

== Overview ==
The Futazuka Kofun is located at an elevation of about 200 meters at the foot of Mount Katsuragi, with a panoramic view of the Yamato Basin to the east. The tumulus is a north-facing zenpō-kōen-fun (前方後円墳), which is shaped like a keyhole, having one square end and one circular end, when viewed from above; however, it was built in a unique way, with the sides of the tumulus excavated into the high slope of the mountain. The mound is two-tiered and has a total length of 60 meters, with the posterior circular portion having a diameter of 36 meters and a height of 10 meters, the anterior rectangular portion is 41 meters wide and 10 meters high, with a projection on the west side of the narrow portion between the two portions. As both portions of the tumulus are over 10 meters high, it a squat shape and appears at first glance two circular tombs connected together, but this is because earth was piled up to create a burial chamber in both sections of the tumulus. There is a deep moat on the east side of the tumulus, and a shallow moat on the west side. No haniwa have been found, but fukiishi roofing stones were laid in key areas.

The existence of a stone burial chamber in the circular posterior mound has been known since ancient times, but an archaeological excavation in 1958 revealed that there were also burial chambers in the anterior portion and the western extension. The posterior burial chamber is 16.7 meters long including the passageway. The burial chamber proper is 6.73 meters long, 2.98 meters wide, and 4.1 meters high, and opens to the south. A drainage ditch has been built in the passageway. The passageway is made of piled-up natural stones. It is believed that a tuff sarcophagus was placed in the burial chamber, but it has been destroyed and details are unknown. Although the burial chamber has been open since ancient times, and excavations have unearthed gilt bronze flower-shaped seating brackets, horse equipment, iron weapons, farming tools, and beads.

The anterior burial chamber is 9 meters long, including the passageway. The burial chamber proper is 3.9 meters long, 1.7 meters wide, and 1.9 meters high. Only the bottom part of the tuff composite sarcophagus remains. Horse equipment, farming tools, and gold and silver hollow beads have been excavated.

The stone chamber in the western projection is a type also found in parts of the Korean Peninsula. The chamber has a total length of 7.82 meters, while the burial chamber proper measuring 4.48 meters long, 1.35 meters wide, and 1.26 meters high. It is unusual in that the burial chamber is built one step lower (about 0.9 meters) than the antechamber. Excavations have unearthed amber beads, straight iron swords, iron knives, horse equipment, iron arrowheads, iron axes, iron sickles, iron spades, and a large amount of Sue ware. As this chamber had not been looted, a total of 118 grave goods were found packed tightly together, which led to the theory that this was a stone chamber for burying grave goods. However, as there was a space of about two meters between the artifacts, it is believed that a wooden coffin had once been placed there.

The excavated items are stored at the Nara National Museum, and suggests that the tumulus was built in the late Kofun period, from the early to mid-6th century. It is about a 30-minute walk from Kintetsu Shinjō Station on the Kintetsu Railway Gose Line.

== See also ==
- List of Historic Sites of Japan (Nara)
