= Kitayama Jūhachikento =

- 北山十八間戸
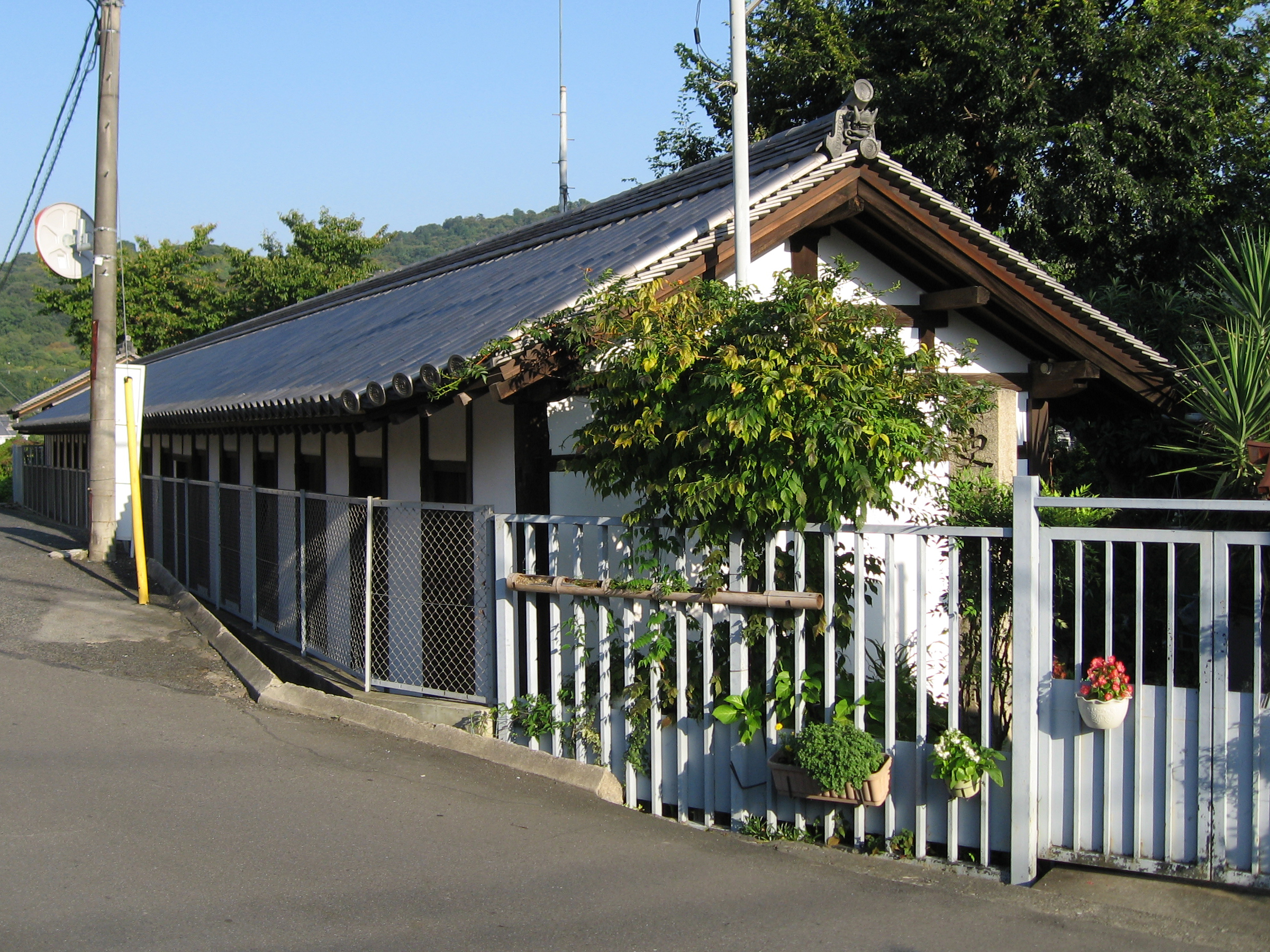
- Kitayama Jūhachikento

- Location within Nara Prefecture Location within Japan

General information
- Location: 454 Kawakami-cho, Nara-shi, Nara-ken, Japan
- Coordinates: 34°41′47″N 135°50′08″E
- Opened: Kamakura period
- Renovated: 1693
- National Historic Site of Japan

The Kitayama Jūhachikento (北山十八間戸) was a welfare facility built in the Kawakami neighborhood of the city of Nara during the Kamakura period to protect and provide relief to people with serious illnesses such as leprosy. It was designated a National Historic Site in 1921.

== Overview ==
The Kitayama Jūhachikento is located on a hill near Narazaka, a road connecting Nara to Kyoto. It is said to have been founded by Ninshō, the head priest of Saidai-ji who was active during the Kamakura period constructing public works, restoring temples and establishing clinics and medical facilities. It was originally located northeast of Hannya-ji, but was burned down in the Miyoshi-Matsunaga Rebellion in 1567. It was moved to its current location during the Kanbun era (1661-1673) and renovated in 1693. It is a long, narrow tenement house that runs north-to-south, with a gabled roof and tiled roof. The building is about 38 meters from east-to-west, and the interior is divided into 18 rooms. Each room is about two tatami mats in size, and there is a Buddhist altar room at the eastern end. The kitchen was located on the east side, and a garden and two wells on the south side. It is said that a total of 18,000 people were provided with food, clothing and shelter here. After World War II, it was inhabited briefly by victims of the Osaka air raids and later by Japanese repatriates from mainland Asia.

== See also ==
- List of Historic Sites of Japan (Nara)
