= Yashikiyama Kofun =

Kofun period burial mound in Japan

- 屋敷山古墳 (Japanese)
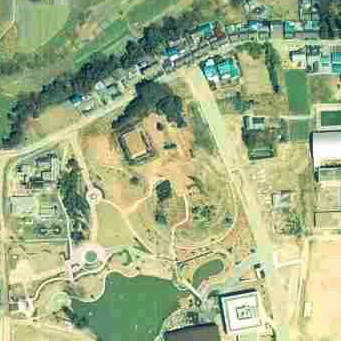
- Grave goods from the Ueyama Kofun

- Yashikiyama Kofun Yashikiyama Kofun (Japan)
- Interactive map of Yashikiyama Kofun
- 34°29′12.62″N 135°42′50.58″E
- Type: Kofun
- Periods: Kofun period
- Location: Katsuragi, Nara, Japan
- Region: Kansai region

History
- Built: c.5th century

Site notes
- Public access: Yes (park)

Yashikiyama Kofun (屋敷山古墳) is a Kofun period burial mound, located in the Shinjō neighborhood of the city of Katsuragi, Nara in the Kansai region of Japan. The tumulus was designated a National Historic Site of Japan in 1972 .

== Overview ==
The Yashikiyama Kofun is located in the southwest of the Nara Basin, on the eastern foot of Mount Katsuragi. The tumulus is a north-northwest-facing zenpō-kōen-fun (前方後円墳), which is shaped like a keyhole, having one square end and one circular end, when viewed from above, with a total length of about 140 meters, making it the largest in Katsuragi City. The posterior circular portion has a diameter of 77–78 meters and height of 15 meters. The anterior rectangular portion has a width of 90 meters. It is unclear whether or not there was an enclosing moat. The tumulus has suffered from various alterations over its history. In the Muromachi period, the Fuse clan built a fortified residence on the mound, and this was expanded in the Edo period by the Kuwayama clan, daimyō of Yamato Shinjō Domain, hence the name of "Yashikiyama". In modern times, a water tank was installed on the tumulus.

Cylindrical and figurative haniwa (house-shaped, lid-shaped, shield-shaped, etc.) have been found on the outside of the tumulus. The burial facility is a vertical-entry stone burial chamber, which contained a stone coffin. The details are unclear because it was destroyed in pre-modern times, but the stone materials from the stone chamber and parts of the sarcophagus were found scattered in various places; however, the sarcophagus is made of Tatsuyama stone from the Kakogawa River basin in Hyogo Prefecture. Excavated grave goods include small glass beads, iron spears, knives, iron nails, and rivets. The construction date of the tumulus is estimated to be around the middle of the 5th century, during the middle of the Kofun period.

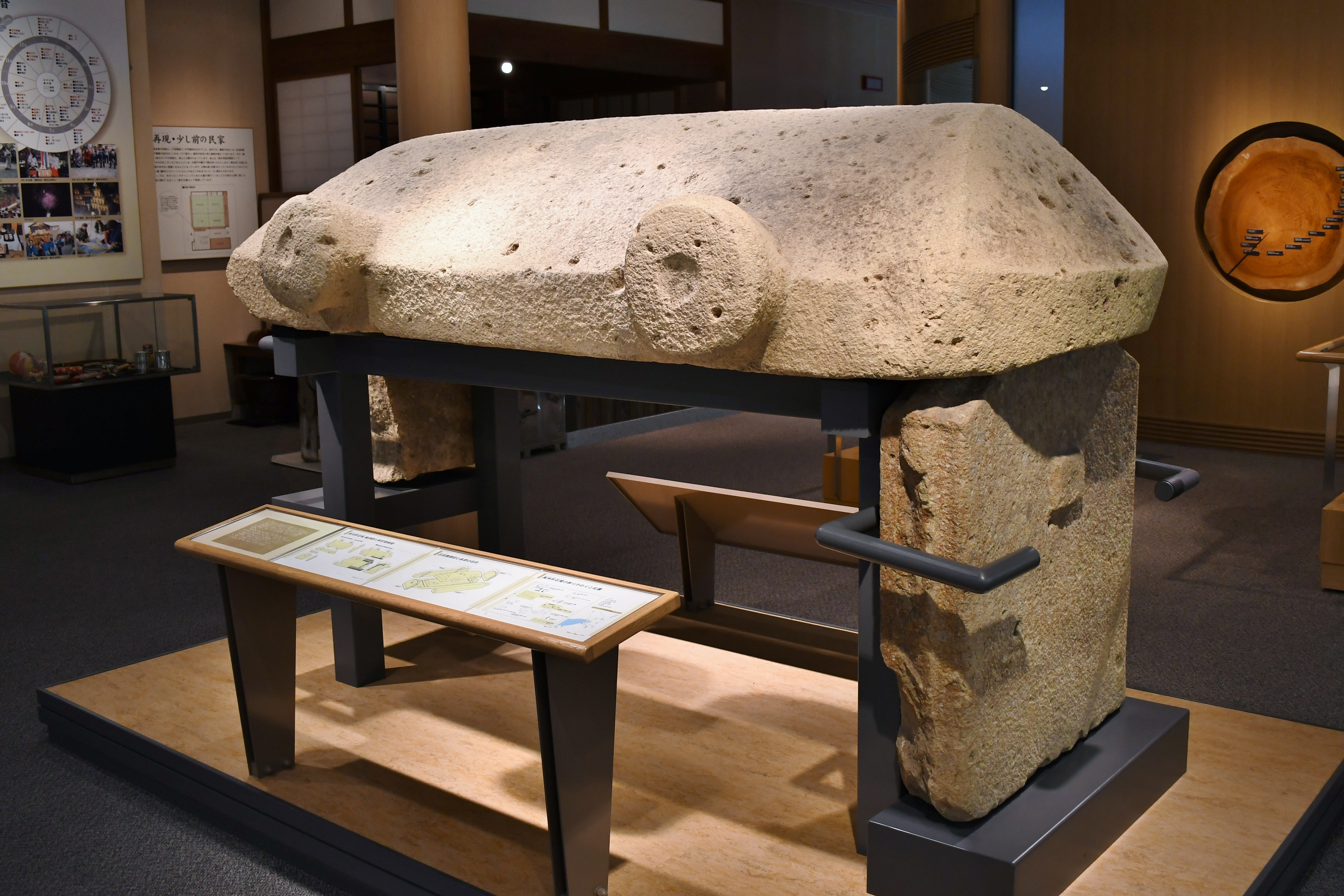
Sarcophagus

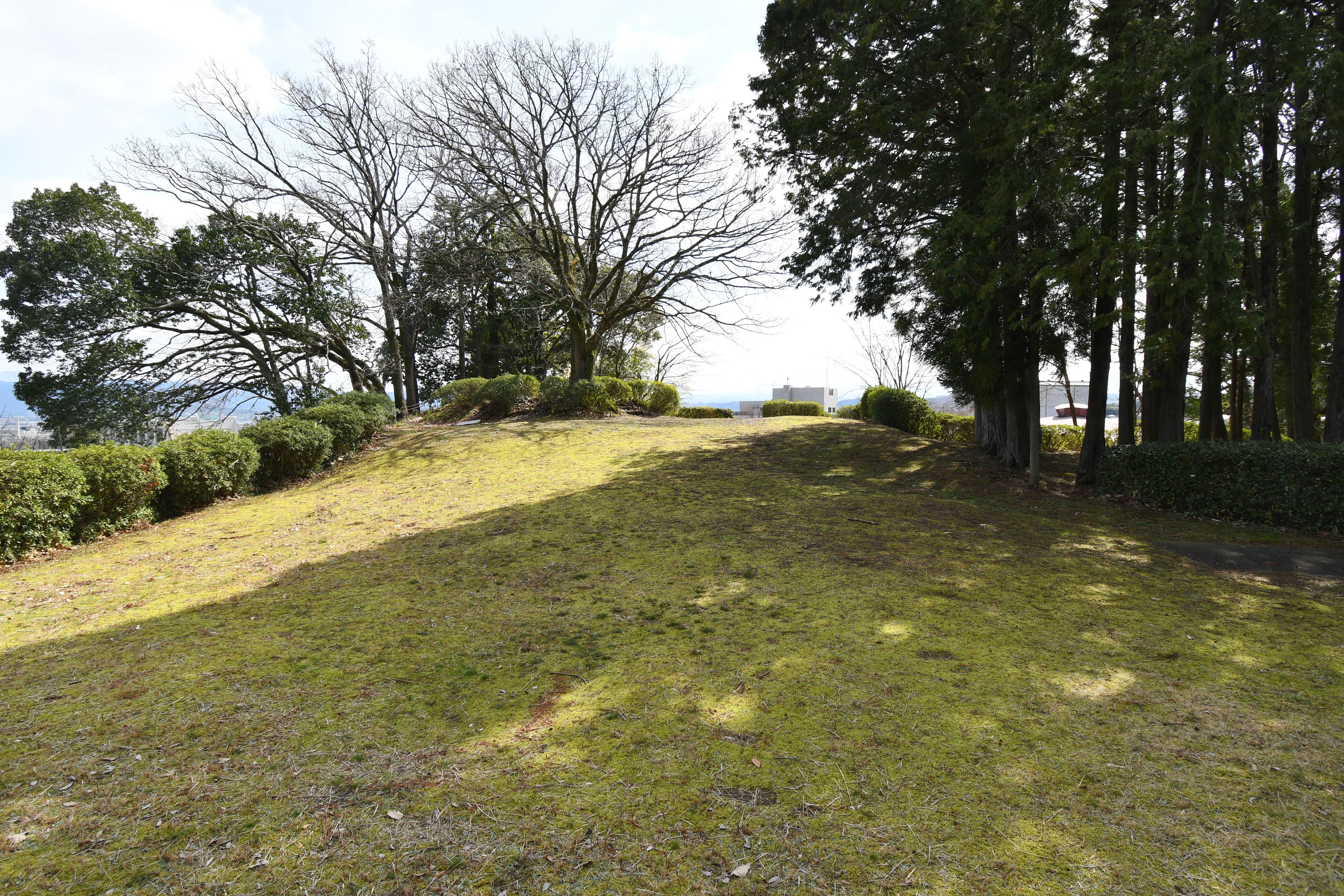
View of the rear mound from the front

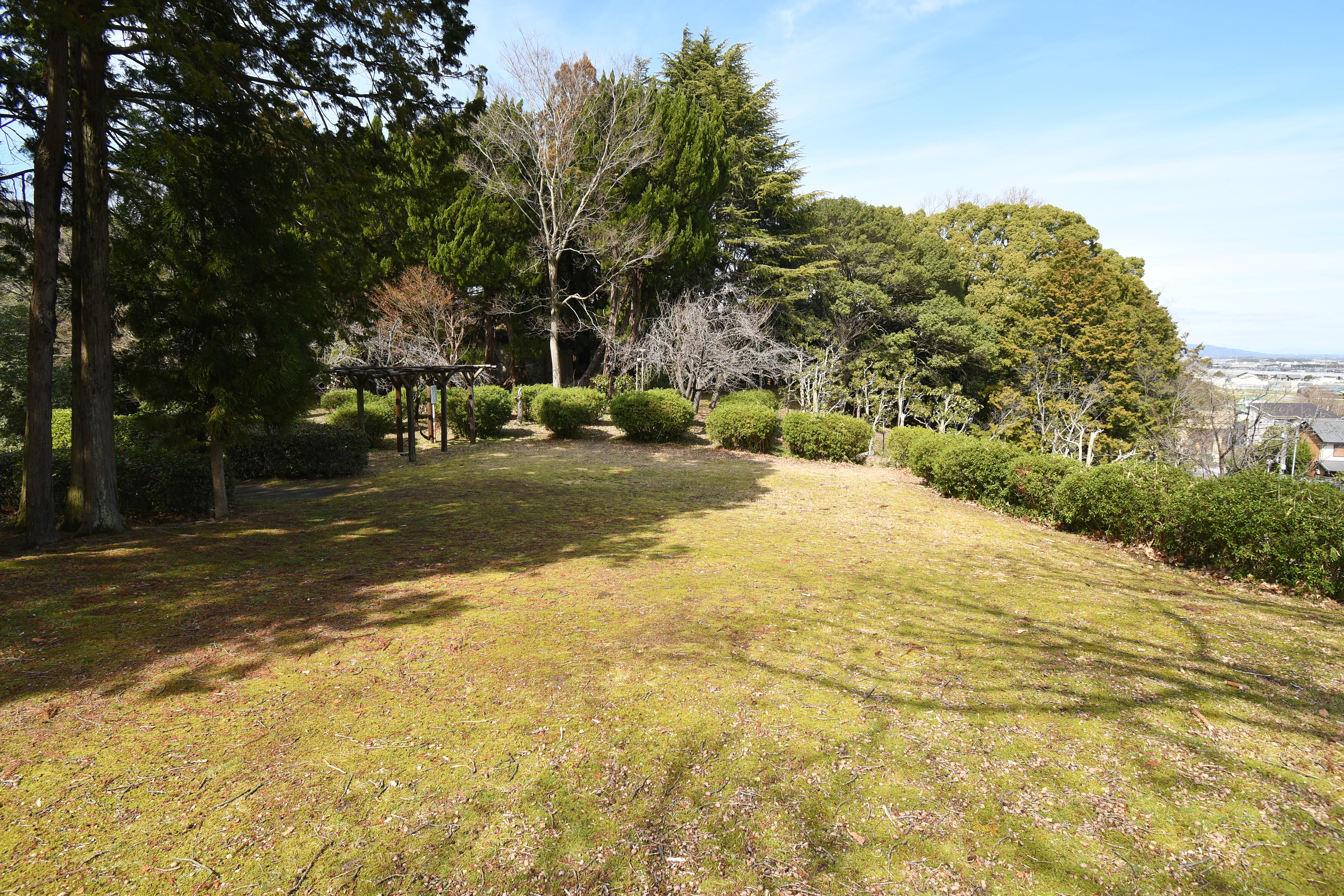
View of the front from the rear mound

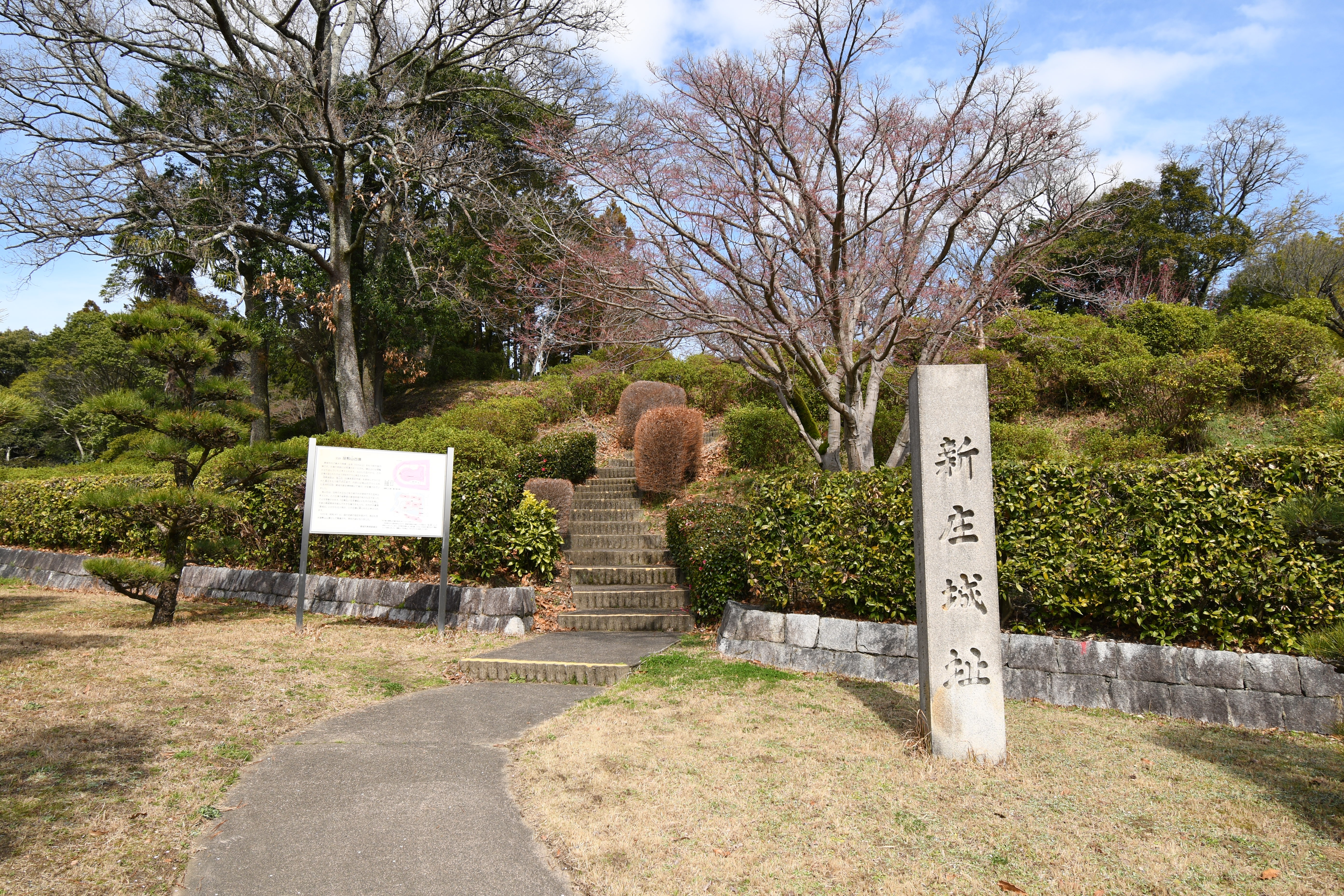
Rear mound

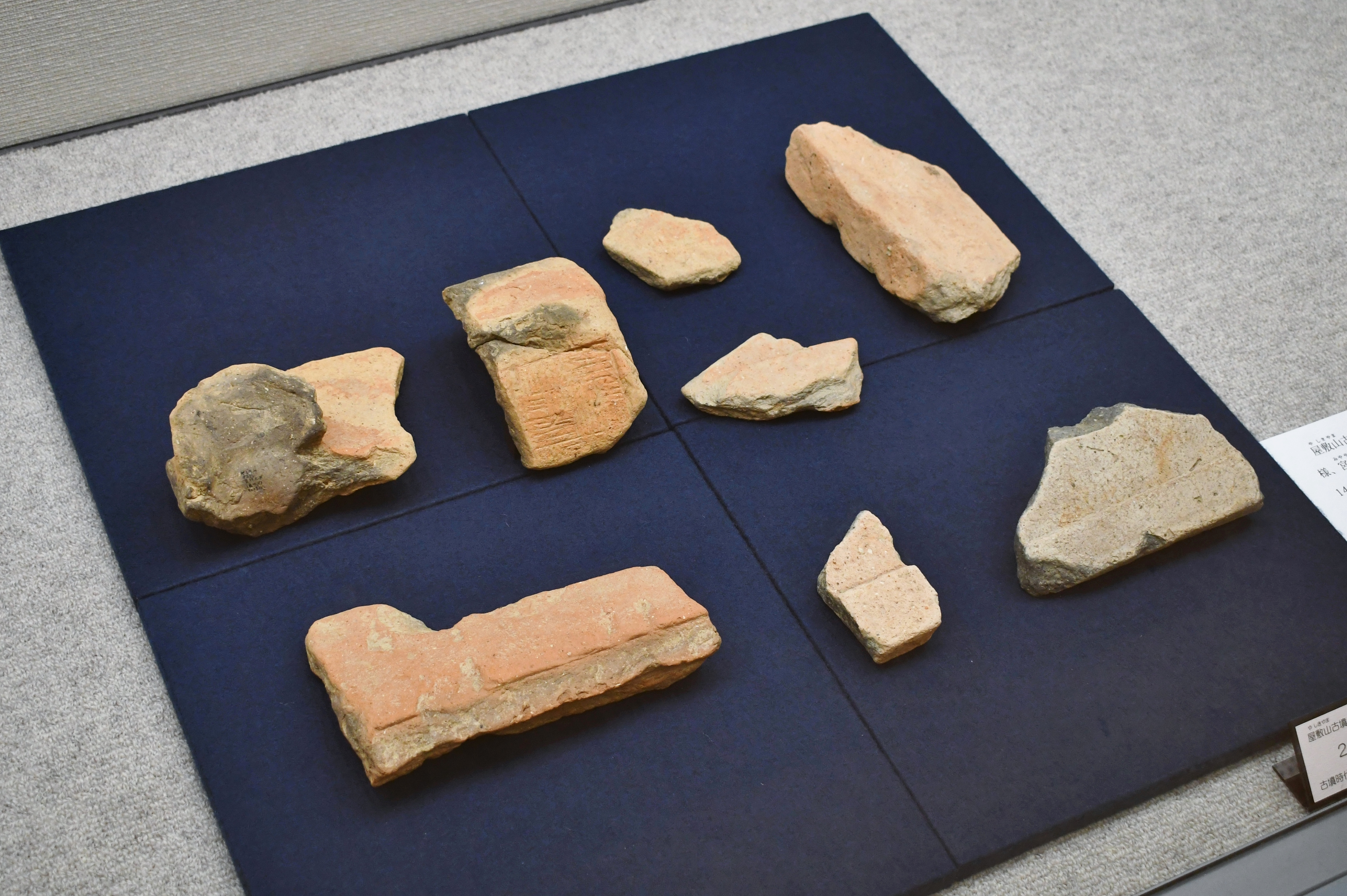
Fragment of house-shaped haniwa
Photographed during a special exhibition at the Nara Prefectural Kashihara Archaeological Institute Museum.

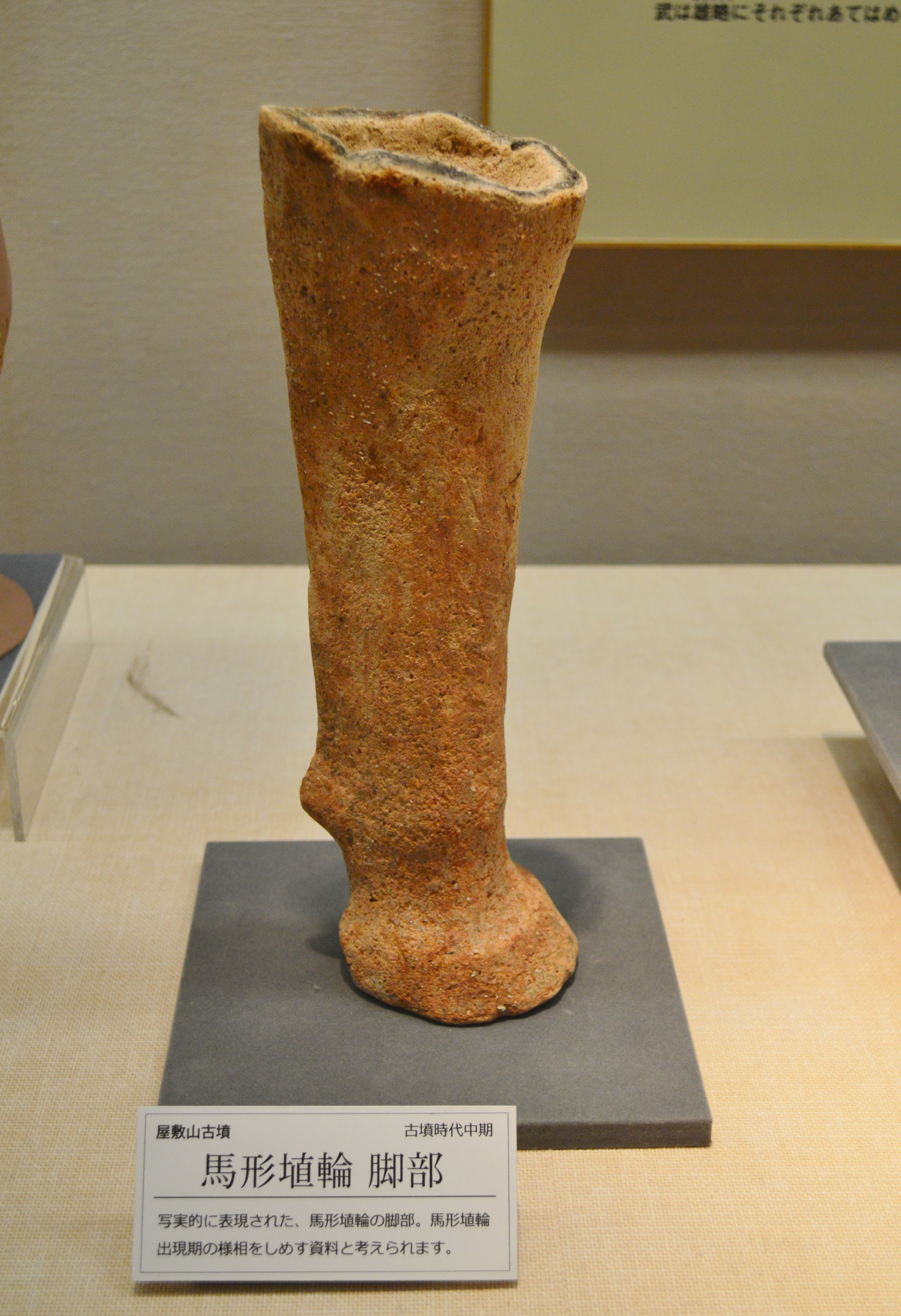
Leg of horse-shaped haniwa
Displayed at Katsuragi City History Museum.

Currently, the site has been developed and is open to the public as Yashikiyama Park. It is about a 20-minute walk from Kintetsu Shinjō Station on the Kintetsu Railway Gose Line.

== See also ==
- List of Historic Sites of Japan (Nara)
