= List of historic sites of Japan (Nara) =

This list is of the historic sites of Japan located within the Prefecture of Nara.

== National Historic Sites ==
As of 17 June 2022, one hundred and twenty-seven Sites have been designated as being of national significance (including ten *Special Historic Sites); Ishinokarato Kofun and Narayama Tile Kiln Sites span the prefectural borders with Kyoto, Ōmine Okugakemichi those with Wakayama, and Kumano Sankeimichi those with both Wakayama and Mie. Many are inscribed on the UNESCO World Heritage List as component sites of the Historic Monuments of Ancient Nara, Buddhist Monuments in the Hōryū-ji Area or Sacred Sites and Pilgrimage Routes in the Kii Mountain Range; others have been proposed for future inscription as part of Asuka-Fujiwara: Archaeological sites of Japan’s Ancient Capitals and Related Properties.

Site	Municipality	Comments	Image	Coordinates	Type	Ref.
*Kitora Kofun キトラ古墳 Kitora kofun	Asuka	Kofun period tumulus	Kitora Kofun	34°27′04″N 135°48′19″E	1	3293
*Takamatsuzuka Kofun 高松塚古墳 Takamatsuzuka kofun	Asuka	Kofun period tumulus	Takamatsuzuka Kofun	34°27′44″N 135°48′22″E	1	2020
*Yamada-dera ruins 山田寺跡 Yamada-dera ato	Sakurai	Asuka period temple ruins	Yamada-dera ruins	34°29′03″N 135°49′48″E	3	1931
*Ishibutai Kofun 石舞台古墳 Ishibutai kofun	Asuka	Kofun period tumulus	Ishibutai Kofun	34°28′01″N 135°49′34″E	1	1984
*Suyama Kofun 巣山古墳 Suyama kofun	Kōryō	Kofun period tumulus	Suyama Kofun	34°33′24″N 135°44′28″E	1	1959
*Fujiwara Palace Site 藤原宮跡 Fujiwara-kyū seki	Kashihara	site of the Asuka period capital of Japan	Fujiwara Palace Site	34°30′08″N 135°48′26″E	2	1989
*Monju-in Nishi Kofun 文殊院西古墳 Monjuin nishi kofun	Sakurai	Kofun period tumulus	Monju-in Nishi Kofun	34°30′14″N 135°50′33″E	1	1944
*Heijō Palace Site 平城宮跡 Heijō-kyū seki	Nara	site of the Nara period capital of Japan	Heijō Palace Site	34°41′31″N 135°47′50″E	2	1942
*Heijō-kyō Sakyō Sanjō Nibō Palace Garden 平城京左京三条二坊宮跡庭園 Heijō-kyō Sakyō Sanjō Nibō miya ato teien	Nara	also a Special Place of Scenic Beauty	Heijō-kyō Sakyō Sanjō Nibō Palace Garden	34°41′02″N 135°48′08″E	2	2032
*Moto Yakushi-ji ruins 本薬師寺跡 Moto-Yakushiji ato	Kashihara	Asuka period temple ruins	Moto Yakushiji ruins	34°29′34″N 135°48′00″E	3	1934
Nagareyama Kofun cluster ナガレ山古墳 Nagareyama kofun-gun	Kawai	Kofun period tumulus	Nagareyama Kofun cluster	34°33′36″N 135°44′10″E	1	2029
Marukoyama Kofun マルコ山古墳 Marukoyama kofun	Asuka	Kofun period tumulus	Marukoyama Kofun	34°27′39″N 135°47′26″E	1	2038
Mesuriyama Kofun メスリ山古墳 Mesuriyama kofun	Sakurai	Kofun period tumulus	Mesuriyama Kofun	34°29′55″N 135°50′50″E	1	2036
Ōbara-dera ruins 粟原寺跡 Ōbaradera ato	Sakurai	Asuka period temple ruins	Ōbaradera ruins	34°29′55″N 135°53′32″E	3	1954
Abe-dera ruins 安倍寺跡 Abedera ato	Sakurai	Asuka period temple ruins	Abedera ruins	34°30′05″N 135°50′23″E	3	2015
Uda Matsuyama Castle Site 宇陀松山城跡 Uda Matsuyama-jō ato	Uda	Sengoku period castle ruins	Uda Matsuyama Castle Site	34°28′53″N 135°56′15″E	2	00003506
Uchi River Rock Carvings 宇智川磨崖碑 Uchi-gawa magaihi	Gojō	Nara period magaibutsu carvings	Uchi River Rock Carvings	34°21′26″N 135°42′41″E	3	1935
Udozuka Kofun 烏土塚古墳 Udozuka kofun	Heguri	Kofun period tumulus	Udozuka Kofun	34°37′04″N 135°42′09″E	1	2017
Eisan-ji Temporary Palace Site 栄山寺行宮跡 Eisanji angū ato	Gojō	Nanboku-chō palace for the Southern Court	Eisanji Temporary Palace Site	34°21′21″N 135°43′15″E	2	1986
Shiozuka Kofun 塩塚古墳 Shiozuka kofun	Nara	Kofun period tumulus	Shiozuka Kofun	34°42′10″N 135°47′34″E	1	2025
Oka-dera ruins 岡寺跡 Okadera ato	Asuka	Asuka period temple ruins	Okadera ruins	34°28′18″N 135°49′41″E	3	00003465
Yashikiyama Kofun 屋敷山古墳 Yashikiyama kofun	Katsuragi	Kofun period tumulus	Yashikiyama Kofun	34°29′13″N 135°42′50″E	1	2018
Otomeyama Kofun 乙女山古墳 Otomeyama kofun	Kawai, Kōryō	Kofun period tumulus	Otomeyama Kofun	34°33′50″N 135°44′23″E	1	1994
Hanayamazuka Kofun 花山塚古墳 Hanayamazuka kofun	Sakurai	Kofun period tumulus	Hanayamazuka Kofun	34°30′26″N 135°54′25″E	1	1960
Nukatabe Kiln Site 額田部窯跡 Nukatabe kama ato	Yamatokōriyama	Kamakura period kiln ruins	Nukatabe Kiln Site	34°36′10″N 135°46′21″E	6	1967
Chihara Ōbaka Kofun 茅原大墓古墳 Chihara Ōbaka kofun	Sakurai	Kofun period tumulus	Chihara Ōbaka Kofun	34°32′12″N 135°50′50″E	1	2039
Maruyama Kofun 丸山古墳 Maruyama kofun	Kashihara	Kofun period tumulus	Maruyama Kofun	34°28′36″N 135°47′53″E	1	2013
Iwayayama Kofun 岩屋山古墳 Iwayayama kofun	Asuka	Kofun period tumulus	Iwayayama Kofun	34°27′57″N 135°47′51″E	1	2012
Kibi-ike temple ruins 吉備池廃寺跡 Kibi-ike Haiji ato	Sakurai	Asuka period temple ruins	Kibi-ike temple ruins	34°30′19″N 135°50′00″E	3	3325
Mount Yoshino 吉野山 Yoshino-yama	Yoshino	Holy mountain, also a Place of Scenic Beauty	Mount Yoshino	34°21′23″N 135°52′14″E	2, 3	1950
Tachibana-dera Precinct 橘寺境内 Tachibanadera keidai	Asuka	Asuka period temple ruins	Tachibanadera Precinct	34°28′12″N 135°49′04″E	3	2009
Miyayama Kofun 宮山古墳 Miyayama kofun	Gose	Kofun period tumulus	Miyayama Kofun	34°26′34″N 135°44′01″E	1	1937
Miyataki Site 宮滝遺跡 Miyataki iseki	Yoshino	Jomon through early Nara period settlement traces; site of Asuka period Yoshino Palace	Miyataki Site	34°22′37″N 135°53′34″E	1, 2	2000
Koseyama Kofun Cluster 巨勢山古墳群 Koseyama kofun-gun	Gose	Kofun period tumuli cluster	Koseyama Kofun Cluster	34°26′05″N 135°44′12″E	1	3349
Kose-dera Pagoda Site 巨勢寺塔跡 Kosedera tō ato	Gose	Asuka period temple ruins	Kosedera Pagoda Site	34°25′32″N 135°45′12″E	3	1955
Kōfuku-ji Old Precinct 興福寺旧境内 Kōfukuji kyū-keidai	Nara	One of the Seven Great Temples of Nara	Kōfukuji Old Precinct	34°40′57″N 135°49′52″E	3	2010
Mount Kongō 金剛山 Kongō-san	Gose	Holy mountain	Mount Kongō	34°25′01″N 135°40′39″E	2, 3	1979
Kushiyama Kofun 櫛山古墳 Kushiyama kofun	Tenri	Kofun period tumulus	Kushiyama Kofun	34°33′25″N 135°51′07″E	1	1998
Kengoshizuka Kofun - Koshitsukagomon Kofun 牽牛子塚古墳・越塚御門古墳 Kengoshizuka kofun・Koshitsukagomon kofun	Asuka	Kofun period tumuli	Kengoshizuka Kofun - Koshitsukagomon Kofun	34°27′59″N 135°47′32″E	1	1945
Mita-Ōsawa Kofun Cluster 見田・大沢古墳群 Mita-Ōsawa kofun-gun	Uda	early Kofun period tumuli cluster	Mita-Ōsawa Kofun Cluster	34°28′51″N 135°58′27″E	1	2041
Gangō-ji Gokuraku-in (Gokurakubō) 元興寺極楽坊境内 Gangōji Gokurakubō keidai	Nara	Remnant of one of the Seven Great Temples of Nara	Gangōji Gokurakubō Precinct	34°40′40″N 135°49′53″E	3	2004
Gangō-ji Kotōin Site 元興寺小塔院跡 Gangōji Kotōin ato	Nara	Remnant of one of the Seven Great Temples of Nara	Gangōji Kotōin Site	34°40′35″N 135°49′46″E	3	2005
Gangō-ji Pagoda Site 元興寺塔跡 Gangōji tō ato	Nara	Remnant of one of the Seven Great Temples of Nara	Gangōji Pagoda Site	34°40′36″N 135°49′54″E	3	1975
Gyōki Grave 行基墓 Gyōki-no-haka	Ikoma	Grave of Asuka/Nara period monk	Gyōki Grave	34°40′21″N 135°42′13″E	7	1936
Takamiya temple ruins 高宮廃寺跡 Takamiya Haiji ato	Gose	Asuka period temple ruins	Takamiya temple ruins	34°24′14″N 135°41′26″E	3	1956
Takatori Castle ruins 高取城跡 Takatori-jō ato	Takatori	Sengoku period castle ruins	Takatori Castle ruins	34°25′53″N 135°49′34″E	2	1992
Kurozuka Kofun 黒塚古墳 Kurozuka kofun	Tenri	Kofun period tumulus	Kurozuka Kofun	34°33′36″N 135°50′35″E	1	3283
Samida Takarazuka Kofun 佐味田宝塚古墳 Samida Takarazuka kofun cluster	Kawai	Kofun period tumulus	Samida Takarazuka Kofun cluster	34°33′23″N 135°43′36″E	1	2046
Sakurai Chausuyama Kofun 桜井茶臼山古墳 Sakurai Chausuyama kofun	Sakurai	Kofun period tumulus	Sakurai Chausuyama Kofun	34°30′41″N 135°51′25″E	1	2021
Mii 三井 Mii	Ikaruga	Asuka period well	Mii	34°37′23″N 135°44′16″E	3, 8	1988
Mii Tile Kiln Site 三井瓦窯跡 Mii kawara kama ato	Ikaruga	Asuka period kiln remains		34°37′26″N 135°44′37″E	6	1974
Ichiohakayama Kofun - Ichio Miyazuka Kofun 市尾墓山古墳・市尾宮塚古墳 Ichiohakayama kofun・Ichio Miyazuka kofun	Takatori	Kofun period tumuli	Ichiohakayama Kofun - Ichio Miyazuka Kofun	34°26′34″N 135°46′21″E	1	2037
Jikō-in Gardens 慈光院庭園 Jikōin teien	Yamatokōriyama	Edo period tea ceremony gardens, also a Place of Scenic Beauty	Jikōin Gardens	34°37′54″N 135°45′29″E	8	1982
Tamakiyama Kofun Cluster 珠城山古墳 Tamakiyama kofun	Sakurai	Kofun period tumuli cluster		34°32′47″N 135°50′54″E	1	2030
Sakafuneishi Site 酒船石遺跡 Sakafuneishi iseki	Asuka	Asuka period monolith with mysterious carvings	Sakafuneishi Site	34°28′32″N 135°49′24″E	1	1963
Kasugayama Stone Buddhas 春日山石窟仏 Kasuga-yama sekkutsubutsu	Nara	Heian period stone carvings	Kasugayama Stone Buddhas	34°40′36″N 135°52′25″E	3	1948
Kasuga Taisha Precinct 春日大社境内 Kasuga Taisha keidai	Nara	Ancient Shinto shrine	Kasuga Taisha Precinct	34°40′53″N 135°50′54″E	3	2045
Oharida no Yasumaro Tomb 小治田安萬侶の墓 Oharida no Yasumaro no haka	Nara		Oharida no Yasumaro Tomb	34°35′48″N 135°56′57″E	7	2014
Matsuyama Nishiguchi Barrier Gate 松山西口関門 Matsuyama nishiguchi kanmon	Uda	Edo period castle town gate	Matsuyama Nishiguchi Barrier Gate	34°29′00″N 135°55′52″E	2	1971
Shōbuike Kofun 菖蒲池古墳 Shōbuike kofun	Kashihara	Kofun period tumulus	Shōbuike Kofun	34°28′21″N 135°48′28″E	1	1962
Kanmaki Kudo Kofun Cluster 上牧久渡古墳群 Kanmaki Kudo kofun-gun	Kanmaki	Kofun period tumuli cluster	Kanmaki Kudo Kofun Cluster	34°33′06″N 135°42′34″E	1	00003881
Ueyama Kofun 植山古墳 Ueyama kofun	Kashihara	Kofun period tumulus	Ueyama Kofun	34°28′35″N 135°48′14″E	1	3324
Niizawa Senzuka Kofun Cluster 新沢千塚古墳群 Niizawa Senzuka kofun-gun	Kashihara	Kofun period tumuli cluster	Niizawa Senzuka Kofun Cluster	34°28′54″N 135°46′29″E	1	2028
Former Morino physic garden 森野旧薬園 Morino kyū-Yaku-en	Uda	Edo period medicinal herb garden	Former Morino physic garden	34°28′41″N 135°55′58″E	5	1952
Midoro Kofun 水泥古墳 Midoro kofun	Gose	Kofun period tumulus	Midoro Kofun	34°24′43″N 135°44′33″E	1	2003
Shōchō 1 Yagyū Tokusei Inscription 正長元年柳生徳政碑 Shōchō gannen Yagyū tokusei-hi	Nara	Nanboku-cho period monument	Shōchō 1 Yagyū Tokusei Inscription	34°43′44″N 135°57′11″E	3, 7	2040
Somanouchi Kofun cluster 杣之内古墳群 Somanouchi Kofun-gun	Tenri	Kofun period tumulus	Somanouchi Kofun cluster	34°35′33″N 135°50′35″E	1	1958
Saidai-ji Precinct 西大寺境内 Saidaiji keidai	Nara	Nara period temple foundations	Saidaiji Precinct	34°41′36″N 135°46′46″E	3	2006
Akatsuchiyama Kofun 赤土山古墳 Akatsuchiyama kofun	Tenri	Kofun period tumulus	Akatsuchiyama Kofun	34°37′10″N 135°50′22″E	1	2049
Kawara-dera Site 川原寺跡 Kawaradera ato	Asuka	Asuka period temple ruins	Kawaradera Site	34°28′21″N 135°49′03″E	3	1932
Ō no Yasumaro Tomb 太安萬侶墓 Ō no Yasumaro no haka	Nara	grave of Asuka period nobleman	Ō no Yasumaro Tomb	34°39′55″N 135°54′27″E	7	2035
Daian-ji Former Precinct 大安寺旧境内附石橋瓦窯跡 Daianji kyū-keidai tsuketari Ishibashi kawara gama ato	Nara	Asuka period temple ruins; designation includes the Ishibashi Tile Kiln Site	Daianji Former Precinct	34°48′00″N 135°48′56″E	3	1930
Daikandai-ji Site 大官大寺跡 Daikandaiji ato	Asuka	Asuka period temple ruins	Daikandaiji Site	34°29′18″N 135°49′05″E	3	1933
Ōmiwa Jinja Precinct 大神神社境内 Ōmiwa Jinja keidai	Sakurai	Ancient Shinto shrine	Ōmiwa Jinja Site	34°31′59″N 135°51′45″E	3	2044
Ōtsukayama Kofun Cluster 大塚山古墳群 Ōtsukayama kofun-gun	Kawai	Kofun period tumuli cluster; designation includes Ōtsukayama Kofun (大塚山古墳), Shiroyama Kofun (城山古墳), Takayamazuka No.1, 2, 3, 4 Kofun (高山塚一・二・三・四号古墳), Kusōzuka Kofun (九僧塚古墳), and Maruyama Kofun (丸山古墳)	Ōtsukayama Kofun Cluster	34°35′09″N 135°44′35″E	1	1995
Ōminesan-ji Precinct 大峰山寺境内 Ōminesanji keidai	Tenkawa	Holy mountain	Ōminesanji Precinct	34°15′14″N 135°56′25″E	3	3358
Ōno-dera Stone Buddhas 大野寺石仏 Ōnodera sekibutsu	Uda	Kamakura period magaibutsu	Ōnodera Stone Buddhas	34°33′45″N 136°00′55″E	3	1981
Jigokudani Stone Buddhas 地獄谷石窟仏 Jigokudani sekkutsubutsu	Nara	Nara-Heian period stone carvings	Jigokudani Stone Buddhas	34°40′28″N 135°52′38″E	3	1949
Chūgū-ji Site 中宮寺跡 Chūgūji ato	Ikaruga	Asuka period temple	Chūgūji Site	34°36′59″N 135°44′38″E	3	2047
Nakaoyama Kofun 中尾山古墳 Nakaoyama kofun	Asuka	Kofun period tumulus	Nakaoyama Kofun	34°27′51″N 135°48′22″E	1	1961
Jōrin-ji ruins 定林寺跡 Jōrinji ato	Asuka	Asuka period temple ruins		34°28′01″N 135°48′46″E	3	2007
Akasaka Tennōzan Kofun 天王山古墳 Akasaka Tennōzan kofun	Sakurai	Kofun period tumulus	Akasaka Tennōzan Kofun	34°30′01″N 135°52′28″E	1	1993
Karako-Kagi Site 唐古・鍵遺跡 Karako・Kagi iseki	Tawaramoto	Karako-Kagi Archaeological Museum	Karako-Kagi Site	34°34′05″N 135°47′50″E	1	3220
Tōshōdai-ji Old Precinct 唐招提寺旧境内 Tōshōdaiji kyū-keidai	Nara	Nara period temple	Tōshōdaiji Old Precinct	34°40′30″N 135°47′05″E	3	2011
Shimanoyama Kofun 島の山古墳 Shimanoyama kofun	Kawanishi	Kofun period tumulus	Shimanoyama Kofun	34°35′01″N 135°45′57″E	1	3337
Tōdai-ji Old Precinct 東大寺旧境内 Tōdaiji kyū-keidai	Nara	Nara period temple	Tōdaiji Old Precinct	34°41′22″N 135°50′24″E	3	1977
Tōdai-ji Tōnan-in Old Precinct 東大寺東南院旧境内 Tōdaiji Tōnan-in kyū-keidai	Nara	Nara period temple ruins		34°41′08″N 135°50′29″E	2	1978
Taima-dera Nakanobō Gardens 当麻寺中之坊庭園 Taimadera Nakanobō teien	Katsuragi	also a Place of Scenic Beauty	Taimadera Nakanobō Gardens	34°30′56″N 135°41′43″E	8	1980
Fujinoki Kofun 藤ノ木古墳 Fujinoki kofun	Ikaruga	Kofun period tumulus	Fujinoki Kofun	34°36′42″N 135°43′46″E	1	2048
Fujiwara-kyō Site 藤原京跡 Fujiwara-kyō seki	Kashihara	designation include the Suzaku Avenue (朱雀大路跡), Sakyō Shichijō Ichi-Nibō (左京七条一・二坊跡), and Ukyō Shichijō Ichibō (右京七条一坊跡) Sites	Fujiwara-kyō Site	34°29′46″N 135°48′27″E	2	2031
Fujiwara no Muchimaro Grave 藤原武智麿墓 Fujiwara no Muchimaro no haka	Gojō			34°21′37″N 135°43′15″E	7	1987
Zutō 頭塔 Zutō	Nara	Nara period step pyramid Buddhist site	Zutō	34°40′38″N 135°50′20″E	3	1939
Futazuka Kofun 瓢箪山古墳 Futazuka kofun	Katsuragi	Kofun period tumulus	Futazuka Kofun	34°29′13″N 135°42′02″E	1	2033
Ninji temple ruins 尼寺廃寺跡 Ninji Haiji ato	Kashiba		Ninji temple ruins	34°34′26″N 135°42′03″E	3	3326
Hiso-dera Site 比曽寺跡 Hisodera ato	Ōyodo	Asuka period temple ruins	Hisodera Site	34°24′18″N 135°49′52″E	3	1957
Asuka Inabuchi Palace Site 飛鳥稲淵宮殿跡 Asuka Inabuchi-kyūden ato	Asuka			34°27′47″N 135°49′20″E	2	2034
Asuka Palace Site 飛鳥宮跡 Asuka-kyū-seki	Asuka		Asuka Palace Site	34°28′24″N 135°49′16″E	2	2019
Asuka Capital Site Garden Pond 飛鳥京跡苑池 Asuka-kyō ato enchi	Asuka	also a Place of Scenic Beauty	Asuka Capital Site Garden Pond	34°28′30″N 135°49′07″E	2, 8	00003443
Asuka-dera Site 飛鳥寺跡 Asukadera ato	Asuka	Asuka period temple ruins	Asukadera Site	34°28′43″N 135°49′14″E	3	2008
Asuka Mizuochi Site 飛鳥水落遺跡 Asuka Mizuochi iseki	Asuka	Asuka period water clock ruins	Asuka Mizuochi Site	34°28′49″N 135°49′06″E	2	2027
Asuka Pond Workshop Site 飛鳥池工房遺跡 Asuka-ike kōbō iseki	Asuka	Asuka period government workshops	Asuka Pond Workshop Site	34°28′38″N 135°49′21″E	6	3302
Saki Hyōtanyama Kofun 瓢箪山古墳 Hyōtanyama kofun	Nara	Kofun period tumulus	Hyōtanyama Kofun	34°42′00″N 135°47′29″E	1	2016
Fumi no Nemaro Grave 文祢麻呂の墓 Fumi no Nemaro no haka	Uda	Asuka period general's grave	Fumi no Nemaro Grave	34°30′03″N 135°58′35″E	7	2042
Heijō-kyō Suzaku-ōji 平城京朱雀大路跡 Heijō-kyō Suzaku Ōji	Nara	traces of Nara period main street of Heijō-kyō	Heijō-kyō Suzaku Avenue	34°41′08″N 135°47′40″E	2	2043
Hirano Tsukaanayama Kofun 平野塚穴山古墳 Hirano Tsukaanayama kofun	Kashiba	Kofun period tumulus	Hirano Tsukaanayama Kofun	34°34′01″N 135°41′41″E	1	2022
Hokke-ji Old Precinct 法華寺旧境内 Hokkeiji kyū-keidai	Nara	Asuka period temple; designation includes Hokke-ji Precinct (法華寺境内) and Amida Jōdo-in Site (阿弥陀浄土院跡)	Hokkeiji Old Precinct	34°41′32″N 135°48′15″E	3	3282
Hokki-ji Precinct 法起寺境内 Hokkiji keidai	Ikaruga	Asuka period temple	Hokkiji Precinct	34°37′22″N 135°44′45″E	3	2050
Hōryū-ji Old Precinct 法隆寺旧境内 Hōryūji kyū-keidai	Ikaruga	Asuka period temple	Hōryūji Old Precinct	34°36′52″N 135°44′03″E	2, 3	1991
Kitayama Jūhachikento 北山十八間戸 Kitayama jūhakkenko	Nara		Kitayama Jūhachikento	34°41′47″N 135°50′08″E	5	1938
Bakuya Kofun 牧野古墳 Bakuya kofun	Kōryō	Kofun period tumulus	Bakuya Kofun	34°33′15″N 135°43′27″E	1	1999
Kebara temple ruins 毛原廃寺跡 Kebara Haiji ato	Yamazoe	Nara period temple ruins		34°38′09″N 136°02′43″E	3	1953
Yakushi-ji Old Precinct 薬師寺旧境内 Yakushiji kyū-keidai	Nara		Yakushiji Old Precinct	34°40′07″N 135°47′04″E	3	2051
Yōraku Kofun Cluster 与楽古墳群 Yōraku kofun-gun	Takatori	designation includes Yōraku Kansuzuka Kofun (与楽鑵子塚古墳), Yōraku Kanjo Kofun (与楽カンジョ古墳), and Terasakishirakabezuka Kofun (寺崎白壁塚古墳)	Yōraku Kofun Cluster	34°27′58″N 135°46′47″E	1	00003782
Hinokuma-dera ruins 檜隈寺跡 Hinokumadera ato	Asuka	Asuka period temple ruins	Hinokumadera ruins	34°27′24″N 135°48′11″E	3	00003442
Makimuku Site 纒向遺跡 Makimuku iseki	Sakurai	Yayoi-Kofun period settlement ruins	Makimuku Site	34°32′46″N 135°50′25″E	1	00003818
Makimuku Kofun Cluster 纒向古墳群 Makimuku kofun-gun	Sakurai	Kofun period tumuli cluster	Makimuku Kofun Cluster	34°32′46″N 135°50′10″E	1	00003473
Kusabaka Kofun 艸墓古墳 Kusabaka kofun	Sakurai	Kofun period tumulus	Kusabaka Kofun	34°30′13″N 135°50′46″E	1	2024
Uguisuzuka Kofun 鶯塚古墳 Uguisuzuka kofun	Nara	Kofun period tumulus	Uguisuzuka Kofun	34°41′27″N 135°51′15″E	1	1985
Ōmine Okugakemichi 大峯奥駈道 Ōmine okugakemichi	Yoshino, Kurotaki, Kawakami, Tenkawa, Kamikitayama, Shimokitayama, Totsukawa, Gojō	Holy mountain; designation includes areas of Tanabe and Shingū in Wakayama Prefecture	Ōmine Okugakemichi	34°13′26″N 135°57′19″E	3, 6	3359
Kumano Sankeimichi 熊野参詣道 Kumano sankeimichi	Nosegawa, Totsukawa	designation includes areas of Shingū, Tanabe, Nachikatsuura, Shirahama, Susami, and Kōya in Wakayama Prefecture and Kumano, Owase, Taiki, Kihoku, Mihama, and Kihō in Mie Prefecture	Kumano Sankeimichi	33°54′06″N 135°48′11″E	3, 6	3269
Ishinokarato Kofun 石のカラト古墳 Ishinokarato kofun	Nara	Kofun period tumulus; designation includes an area of Kizugawa in Kyoto Prefecture	Ishinokarato Kofun	34°43′26″N 135°46′43″E	1	3099
Nara-yama Tile Kiln Sites 奈良山瓦窯跡 Nara-yama kawara gama ato	Nara	Nara period tile kiln ruins; designation includes the Utahime (歌姫瓦窯跡), Onjogadani (音如ヶ谷瓦窯跡), Ichisaka (市坂瓦窯跡), Umedani (梅谷瓦窯跡), and Kaseyama (鹿背山瓦窯跡) Tile Kiln Sites and an area of Kizugawa in Kyoto Prefecture		34°43′04″N 135°48′55″E	6	3093
Hashihaka Kofun Moat 箸墓古墳周濠 Hashihaka kofun shūgō	Sakurai	Kofun period tumulus moat	Hashihaka Kofun Moat	34°32′22″N 135°50′18″E	1	00003969
Miyakozuka Kofun 都塚古墳 Miyakozuka kofun	Asuka	Kofun period tumulus	Miyakozuka Kofun	34°28′16″N 135°49′14″E	1	00003995
Jōurugami Kofun 條ウル神古墳 Jōurugami kofun	Gose	Kofun period tumulus	Jōurugami Kofun	34°26′36″N 135°44′39″E	1	00004143
Ise Hon Kaidō 伊勢本街道 Ise Hon Kaidō	Soni			34°29′44″N 136°05′05″E	6	00004144
Kōriyama Castle ruins 郡山城跡 Kōriyama-jō ato	Yamatokōriyama	Edo period castle ruins	Kōriyama Castle ruins	34°39′07″N 135°46′44″E	2	00004165

== Prefectural Historic Sites ==
As of 1 May 2021, fifty-four Sites have been designated as being of prefectural importance.

Site	Municipality	Comments	Image	Coordinates	Type	Ref.
Takidera Rock Buddhas 滝寺の磨崖仏; Takidera no magaibutsu	Nara			34°39′46″N 135°44′35″E		for all refs see
Pagoda Forest 塔の森 tō-no-mori	Nara, Tenri			34°37′57″N 135°54′40″E		
Oyamide Site 尾山代遺跡; Oyamide iseki	Nara			34°42′48″N 136°02′28″E		
Ishiuchi Castle Site 石打城跡; Ishiuchi-jō ato	Nara			34°43′11″N 136°03′54″E		
Sanryōbo Kofun Cluster 三陵墓古墳群; Sanryōbo kofun-gun	Nara			34°35′40″N 135°57′29″E		
Kōriyama Castle Site 郡山城跡; Kōriyama-jō ato	Yamatokōriyama			34°39′07″N 135°46′44″E		
Koizumi Ōtsuka Kofun 小泉大塚古墳; Koizumi Ōtsuka Kofun	Yamatokōriyama			34°37′47″N 135°45′15″E		
Nishitanaka Tile Kiln 西田中瓦窯; Nishitanaka gayō	Yamatokōriyama			34°38′17″N 135°45′18″E		
Nakayama Ōtsuka Kofun 中山大塚古墳; Nakayama Ōtsuka Kofun	Tenri			34°33′58″N 135°50′54″E		
Shimoikeyama Kofun 下池山古墳; Shimoikeyama Kofun	Tenri			34°34′07″N 135°50′47″E		
Kotani Kofun 小谷古墳; Kotani kofun	Kashihara			34°28′27″N 135°47′04″E		
Iwafune 岩船; Iwafune	Kashihara			34°28′14″N 135°47′19″E		
Masuda Pond Embankment 益田池の堤附樋管; Masuda-ike no tsutsumi tsuketari hikan	Kashihara			34°28′51″N 135°47′02″E		
Monju-in Higashi Kofun 文殊院東古墳; Monjuin higashi kofun	Sakurai			34°30′14″N 135°50′33″E		
Tōnomine Chōishi 多武峯町石; Tōnomine chōishi	Sakurai	thirty-one of the original fifty-two stone markers that lead from the first torii to the precinct of Tanzan Jinja; erected in 1654		34°28′51″N 135°47′02″E		
Tanikubi Kofun 谷首古墳; Tanikubi kofun	Sakurai			34°30′06″N 135°50′37″E		
Munesaka Kofun ムネサカ古墳(第1号墳); Munesaka kofun (daiichi-gō fun)	Sakurai			34°30′13″N 135°53′13″E		
Koshizuka Kofun 越塚古墳; Koshizuka kofun	Sakurai			34°29′54″N 135°53′34″E		
Ukita Mori Legendary Site 浮田杜伝説地; Ukita Mori densetsu-chi	Gojō			34°21′42″N 135°42′25″E		
Arasaka Kiln Site 荒坂窯跡; Arasaka kama ato	Gojō			34°22′28″N 135°42′00″E		
Minamiada Ōtsukayama Kofun 南阿田大塚山古墳; Minamiada Ōtsukayama kofun	Gojō			34°22′14″N 135°45′21″E		
Nekozuka Kofun 猫塚古墳; Nekozuka kofun	Gojō			34°22′35″N 135°42′15″E		
Gongendō Kofun 権現堂古墳; Gongendō kofun	Gose			34°25′26″N 135°45′19″E		
Shingūyama Kofun 新宮山古墳; Shingūyama kofun	Gose			34°25′59″N 135°45′06″E		
Mino no Okamaro Tomb 美努岡萬墓; Mino no Okamaro no haka	Ikoma			34°40′01″N 135°42′11″E		
Kubiko Kofun Cluster 首子古墳群; Kubiko kofun-gun	Katsuragi			34°31′08″N 135°41′57″E		
Takenouchi Kofun Cluster 竹内古墳群; Takenouchi kofun-gun	Katsuragi			34°30′36″N 135°41′46″E		
Shibazuka Kofun 芝塚古墳; Shibazuka kofun	Katsuragi			34°30′10″N 135°42′00″E		
Toritaniguchi Kofun 鳥谷口古墳; Toritaniguchi kofun	Katsuragi			34°31′15″N 135°41′17″E		
Hirabayashi Kofun 平林古墳; Hirabayashi kofun	Katsuragi			34°29′54″N 135°41′52″E		
Kamori Haiji 加守廃寺; Kamori Haiji	Katsuragi			34°31′51″N 135°41′16″E		
Tadazuka Haiji 只塚廃寺; Tadazuka Haiji	Katsuragi			34°31′17″N 135°41′59″E		
Fuefuki Shrine Kofun 笛吹神社古墳; Fuefuki Jinja Kofun	Katsuragi			34°28′18″N 135°42′36″E		
Komagaeri Haiji and Tile Kiln Site 駒帰廃寺(伝安楽寺)附瓦窯跡; Komagaeri Haiji (den-Anrakuji) tsuketari kawara gama ato	Uda			34°27′41″N 135°58′40″E		
Okunoshiba No.1 and No.2 Kofun 奥ノ芝1号墳・奥ノ芝2号墳; Okunoshiba ichi-gō fun・Okunoshiba ni-gō fun	Uda			34°32′13″N 135°57′35″E		
Taniwaki Kofun 谷脇古墳; Taniwaki kofun	Uda			34°28′15″N 135°56′58″E		
Iburi-Yakushi Rock Buddhas 飯降薬師の磨崖仏; Iburi-Yakushi no magaibutsu	Uda			34°34′58″N 135°59′36″E		
Ōkawa Site 大川遺跡; Ōkawa iseki	Yamazoe			34°41′50″N 136°04′25″E		
Nishinomiya Kofun 西宮古墳; Nishinomiya Kofun	Heguri			34°37′23″N 135°42′08″E		
Miyayamazuka Kofun 宮山塚古墳; Miyayamazuka Kofun	Heguri			34°37′15″N 135°42′41″E		
Tsuboriyama Kofun ツボリ山古墳; Tsuboriyama Kofun	Heguri			34°37′48″N 135°41′48″E		
Misato Kofun 三里古墳; Misato Kofun	Heguri			34°37′56″N 135°42′29″E		
Heiryū-ji Site 平隆寺跡; Heiryūji ato	Sangō			34°36′20″N 135°41′56″E		
Hotokezuka Kofun 仏塚古墳; Hotokezuka Kofun	Ikaruga			34°37′12″N 135°43′56″E		
Toyoura-dera Site 豊浦寺跡; Toyouradera ato	Asuka			34°28′56″N 135°48′46″E		
Ki-dera Site 紀寺跡; Kidera ato	Asuka			34°29′34″N 135°48′42″E		
Hatakeda Kofun 畠田古墳; Hatakeda kofun	Ōji			34°34′30″N 135°41′15″E		
Daruma-ji Stone Pagoda Site 達磨寺石塔埋納遺構; Darumaji sekitō mainōikō	Ōji			34°35′23″N 135°42′25″E		
Yamato Tenjinyama Kofun 大和天神山古墳; Yamato Tenjinyama kofun	Tenri			34°33′27″N 135°50′45″E		
Miyoshi Ishizuka Kofun 三吉石塚古墳; Miyoshi Ishizuka kofun	Kōryō			34°33′02″N 135°44′07″E		
Okamine Kofun 岡峯古墳; Okamine kofun	Shimoichi			34°22′45″N 135°47′43″E		
Ryūmon-ji Pagoda Site 龍門寺塔跡; Ryūmonji tō ato	Yoshino			34°25′39″N 135°53′29″E		
Ishigami Kofun and Ōiwa No.2 Kofun 石神古墳附大岩二号墳; Ishigami kofun tsuketari Ōiwa ni-gō fun	Ōyodo			34°25′09″N 135°45′56″E		
Saian-ji Site 西安寺跡; Saianji ato	Ōji			34°35′35″N 135°42′46″E		

== Municipal Historic Sites ==
As of 1 May 2021, a further fifty-two Sites have been designated as being of municipal importance.

Site	Municipality	Comments	Image	Coordinates	Type	Ref.
Furuichi Tumulus 古市方形墳; Furuichi hōkeifun	Nara			34°39′43″N 135°50′31″E		
Nogami Kofun 野神古墳; Nogami kofun	Nara			34°39′53″N 135°49′21″E		
Mizuki Kofun 水木古墳; Mizuki kofun	Nara			34°42′11″N 135°55′52″E		
Itsutsuzuka Kofun Cluster 五つ塚古墳群; Itsutsuzuka kofun-gun	Nara			34°38′33″N 135°50′56″E		
Sugawara-higashi Site Haniwa Kiln Sites 菅原東遺跡埴輪窯跡群; Sugawara-higashi iseki haniwa kama ato gun	Nara			34°41′06″N 135°47′00″E		
Minamitawara Rock Buddhas 南田原磨崖仏; Minamitawara magaibutsu	Nara			34°38′52″N 135°54′49″E		
Ōryū-ji Rock Buddhas 王龍寺磨崖仏; Ōryūji magaibutsu	Nara			34°42′16″N 135°43′04″E		
Hōtoku-ji Yagyū Clan Graves 芳徳寺柳生家墓所附列堂和尚墓所; Hōtokuji Yagyū-ke bosho tsuketari tetsudō Oshō bosho	Nara			34°43′54″N 135°57′14″E		
Wakatsuki Village and Moat 若槻環濠及び集落; Wakatsuki kangō oyobi shūraku	Yamatokōriyama			34°38′05″N 135°48′00″E		
Hieda Village and Moat 稗田環濠及び集落; Hieda kangō oyobi shūraku	Yamatokōriyama			34°38′22″N 135°47′46″E		
Toyotomi Hidenaga Grave 大納言塚; Dainagonzuka	Yamatokōriyama			34°38′45″N 135°46′28″E		
Warizuka Kofun 割塚古墳; Warizuka kofun	Yamatokōriyama			34°38′37″N 135°45′27″E		
Utagasaki Mausoleum 歌ヶ崎廟; Utagasaki-byō	Yamatokōriyama			34°39′02″N 135°45′33″E		
Uenomiya Site 上之宮遺跡; Uenomiya iseki	Sakurai			34°30′05″N 135°50′53″E		
Kabutozuka Kofun 兜塚古墳; Kabutozuka kofun	Sakurai			34°29′54″N 135°51′08″E		
Katahara No.1 Tumulus カタハラ1号墳; Katahara ichi-gō fun	Sakurai			34°29′53″N 135°52′36″E		
Kuroma Kofun 黒駒古墳; Kuroma kofun	Gojō			34°20′06″N 135°40′58″E		
Nishiyama Kofun 西山古墳; Nishiyama kofun	Gojō			34°22′37″N 135°42′57″E		
Bessho Shiroyama No. 1 and 2 Tumuli 別所城山第1・2号墳; Bessho Shiroyama daiichi・ni-gō fun	Kashiba			34°32′04″N 135°43′35″E		
Hirano No. 2 and 3 Kilns 平野2・3号窯; Hirano daini・san-gō gama	Kashiba			34°34′06″N 135°41′47″E		
Ana-Yakushi Stone Buddhas 穴薬師石仏; Ana-Yakushi no sekibutsu	Uda			34°34′37″N 135°59′30″E		
Shimokasama Amida Rock Buddhas 下笠間の阿弥陀磨崖仏; Shimokasama no Amida magaibutsu	Uda			34°37′12″N 136°01′29″E		
Iwao Jinja 岩尾神社; Iwao Jinja	Yamazoe			34°41′07″N 136°04′20″E		
Tenjinja Grounds 天神社遷幸の地; Tenjinja senkō no chi	Yamazoe			34°41′12″N 135°59′28″E		
Tennō-no-Mori - Suijin-no-Mori 天王の森・水神の森; Tennō-no-mori・Suijin-no-mori	Yamazoe			34°40′51″N 135°58′32″E		
Hiraiwa Kofun 平岩古墳; Hiraiwa kofun	Yamazoe			34°38′14″N 136°03′26″E		
Yahashira Jinja Precinct 八柱神社境内; Yahashira Jinja keidai	Yamazoe			34°39′31″N 136°01′32″E		
Kenjōtsuka Kofun 剣上塚古墳; Kenjōtsuka kofun	Heguri			34°37′25″N 135°41′47″E		
Kuritsuka Kofun 栗塚古墳; Kuritsuka kofun	Heguri			34°37′19″N 135°42′04″E		
Myōren Grave 命蓮墓; Myōren-no-haka	Heguri	in the grounds of Chōgosonshi-ji		34°36′34″N 135°40′11″E		
Shigisan Castle Site 信貴山城跡; Shigisan-jō ato	Heguri			34°36′46″N 135°40′06″E		
Tateno Castle Hōkyōintō 立野城 宝篋印塔; Tateno-jō hōkyōintō	Sangō			34°36′05″N 135°41′15″E		
Mimuroyama No.2 and No.3 Kofun 三室山古墳 二号墳・三号墳; Mimuroyama kofun ni・san-gō fun	Sangō			34°35′27″N 135°40′55″E		
Tsuji no Kakiuchi No.1 and No.2 Tile Kilns 辻ノ垣内瓦窯1号窯・2号窯; Tsuji no Kakiuchi kawaragama ichi-gō kama ni-gō kama	Sangō			34°36′29″N 135°41′41″E		
Komazuka Kofun 駒塚古墳; Komazuka kofun	Ikaruga			34°36′50″N 135°44′44″E		
Chōshimaru Kofun 調子丸古墳; Chōshimaru kofun	Ikaruga			34°36′47″N 135°44′47″E		
Minabuchi Shōan Grave 南淵請安先生の墓; Minabuchi Shōan sensei no haka	Asuka	in the grounds of Ryūfuku-ji (竜福寺)		34°27′14″N 135°49′31″E		
Stepping Stones of Asuka River 飛鳥川の飛び石; Asuka-gawa no tobiishi	Asuka			34°27′29″N 135°49′09″E		
Abeyama Kofun Cluster 安部山古墳群; Abeyama kofun-gun	Kōryō			34°32′11″N 135°43′53″E		
Makigamine Kofun 槇ヶ峯古墳; Makigamine kofun	Ōyodo			34°23′17″N 135°48′45″E		
Hokura Kofun 保久良古墳; Hokura kofun	Ōyodo			34°24′22″N 135°45′41″E		
Yanagi Crossing 柳の渡し; Yanagi watashi	Ōyodo			34°23′28″N 135°49′57″E		
Nonokuma Kofun 野々熊古墳; Nonokuma kofun	Shimoichi			34°23′08″N 135°48′59″E		
Sainokami Stele 塞の神石碑; Sainokami sekihi	Shimoichi					
Shōya-tsuji Road Marker 庄屋辻の道標; Shōya-tsuji no michi shirube	Shimoichi			34°19′54″N 135°49′00″E		
Taira no Koremori Mound 平維盛塚; Taira no Koremori tsuka	Nosegawa			34°06′48″N 135°38′42″E		
Ōmine Okugakemichi 大峯奥駈道; Ōmine kugakemichi	Kamikitayama			34°13′26″N 135°57′19″E		
Sannokō Palace Site - Mausoleum Site 三之公御所跡及び廟所; Sannokō gosho ato oyobi byōsho	Kawakami			34°15′33″N 136°05′23″E		
Ogura-no-Miya Mausoleum Site - Sumiyoshi Shrine 小倉宮廟所住吉社; Ogura-no-miya byōsho Sumiyoshi-sha	Kawakami					
Dogura Monumental Inscription 土倉翁造林頌徳記念岸壁碑文; Dogura-ō zōrin shōtoku kinen ganpeki hibun	Kawakami			34°21′23″N 135°55′33″E		
Dogura Residence Site 土倉翁屋敷跡; Dogura-ō yashiki ato	Kawakami					

== See also ==
- Cultural Properties of Japan
- Yamato Province
- List of Places of Scenic Beauty of Japan (Nara)
- List of Cultural Properties of Japan - paintings (Nara)
- List of Cultural Properties of Japan - historical materials (Nara)
- List of Cultural Properties of Japan - archaeological materials (Nara)
- Nara National Museum
