= Saki Hyōtanyama Kofun =

Kofun period burial mound in Japan

- 佐紀瓢箪山古墳 (Japanese)
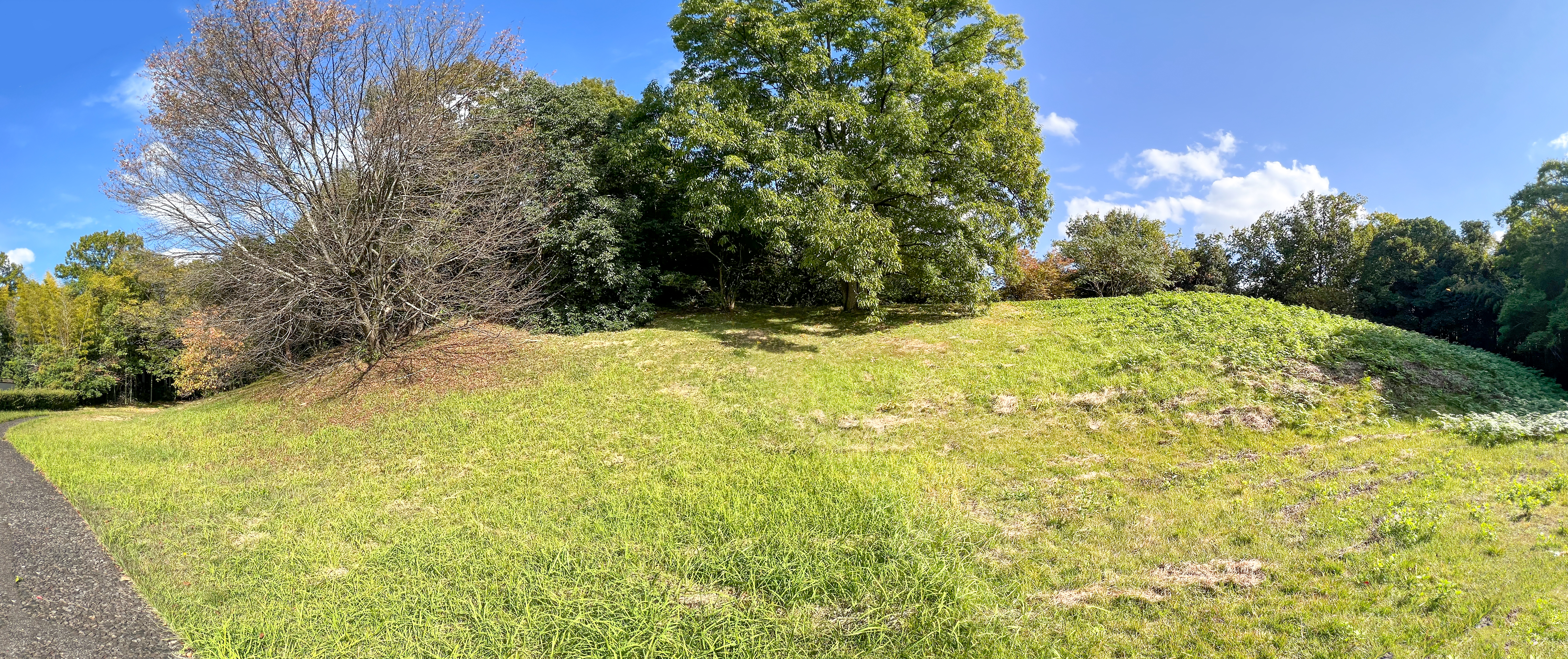
- Saki Hyōtanyama Kofun

- Saki Hyōtanyama Kofun Saki Hyōtanyama Kofun (Japan)
- Interactive map of Saki Hyōtanyama Kofun
- 34°42′0.3″N 135°47′28.8″E
- Type: Kofun
- Periods: Kofun period
- Location: Nara, Nara, Japan
- Region: Kansai region

History
- Built: c.5th century

Site notes
- Public access: Yes (no facilities)

Saki Hyōtanyama Kofun (佐紀瓢箪山古墳) is a burial mound, located in the Sakiemondo-chō neighborhood of the city of Nara in the Kansai region of Japan. The tumulus was designated a National Historic Site of Japan in 1971. It is often referred to as the Hyōtanyama Kofun (瓢箪山古墳), although there are many kofun with the same name throughout Japan.

== Overview ==
The Saki Hyōtanyama Kofun is located is located on the Saki Hills, which mark the northern edge of the Nara Basin. It is one of the Saki Tatenami Kofun cluster, which consists of several very large keyhole-shaped kofun and many large and small kofun built from the early to late Kofun period. Most of the large kofun in this group are designated as imperial tombs by the Imperial Household Agency, and access to the mounds is not permitted and no archaeological excavations have taken place. However, there are three large tumuli of about 100 meters in size that were not designated as imperial tombs, including the Saki Hyōtanyama Kofun.

The tumulus was a zenpō-kōen-fun (前方後円墳), which is shaped like a keyhole, having one square end and one circular end, when viewed from above. However, in 1913, the western side of the front part of the tumulus was removed, and three stone products in the shape of string bridges for a koto (Japanese zither) made of jasper buried in an oval clay coffin measuring 100 cm in length and 60 cm in width was reportedly unearthed. When the tumulus was designated a National Historic Site in 1971, and a survey and small-scale archaeological excavation was conducted. The total length of the tumulus is 96 meters. The circular posterior portion has a diameter 60 meters and height of 10 meters, and anterior rectangular portion has a width of 45 meters and height of seven meters. The excavation revealed there was no moat from the front to the western corner of the anterior portion of the tumulus, as it had been constructed adjacent to the circular Maruzuka Tomb to the southwest. This was a preexisting tumulus, but the builders of the Saki Hyōtanyama Kofun did not want to destroy it during construction, and the two tumuli coexisted with no moat in between. The Maruzuka Kofun was mostly destroyed for soil collection in 1914, and the reason why the Saki Hyōtanyama Kofun had to be built so close to it is unclear. If the tumulus had been constructed slightly to the north, it would have been possible to completely surround it by a moat, so it is clear that there was an intentional purpose for constructing it so close. The tumulus was covered with fukiishi roofing stones and contained haniwa clay figurines.

The tumulus is about a 15-minute walk from Heijō Station on the Kintetsu Kyoto Line.

== See also ==
- List of Historic Sites of Japan (Nara)
