= Tamakiyama Kofun Cluster =

Kofun period keyhole-shaped burial mound in Japan

- 珠城山古墳群 (Japanese)
- Tamakiyama Kofun Cluster Tamakiyama Kofun Cluster (Japan)
- Interactive map of Tamakiyama Kofun Cluster
- 34°32′47″N 135°50′54″E
- Type: Kofun
- Periods: Kofun period
- Location: Sakurai, Nara, Japan
- Region: Kansai region

History
- Built: c.mid-late 6th century

Site notes
- Public access: Yes (no facilities)

Tamakiyama Kofun Cluster (珠城山古墳群) is a group of three Kofun period keyhole-shaped burial mounds, located in the Anashi neighborhood of the city of Sakurai, Nara in the Kansai region of Japan. The tumulus cluster was designated a National Historic Site of Japan in 1978.

== Overview ==
The Tamakiyama Kofun cluster is located on the edge of a hill where a branch of Mount Anashi, a separate peak of Mount Makimuku, extends west, to the north of Mount Miwa on the eastern edge of the Nara Basin. Archaeological excavations have been carried out five times since 1955, and the tombs were noted for the luxurious nature of the grave goods recovered.

Tamakiyama Kofun No. 1 is a zenpō-kōen-fun (前方後円墳), which is shaped like a keyhole, having one square end and one circular end, when viewed from above. It is orientated to the east and had a horizontal-entry stone burial chamber that opens to the south. The tumulus is 53 meters long, 20 meters in diameter at the posterior circular portion, and 20 meters wide at the anterior rectangular portion. The burial chamber is 3. 4 meters long, 1.65 meters wide at the back wall, and about 2 meters high. In the center of the burial chamber, a tuff composite stone coffin was placed along the axis, and inside the coffin were some human bones, knives, and small glass beads. Other grave goods were outside the coffin, including sue ware and haji ware pottery placed along the back wall, horse equipment and a ring-headed iron sword, tools, gilt bronze magatama, silver hollow beads, amber beaded caddies, on the east side of the coffin, and armor and more saddle fittings on the west side of the coffin. The construction period of this tumulus is thought to be the middle to late 6th century.

Tamakiyama Kofun No. 2 is a west-facing zenpō-kōen-fun tumulus with a total length of 75 meters, anterior rectangular portion 40 meters wide, and a posterior circular portion 40 meters in diameter, making it the largest of the group. The interior of the posterior circular portion has not been excavated.

Tamakiyama Kofun No. 3, was also a zenpō-kōen-fun tumulus that was located to the west of Tamakiyama Kofun No. 2. It was mostly leveled in 1958, leaving only a part of the anterior rectangular portion. There are one side-entry stone burial chamber in each of the front and rear mounds, and gilt bronze double phoenix design with openwork apricot leaves earrings, sword fragments, and pottery have been excavated from the front burial chamber. The burial chamber in the rear mound was 9.7 meters long and contained a combination stone sarcophagus.

The group of tombs was probably built in the order of Tomb No. 2, No. 3, and No. 1, and is considered to be part of a series of early and middle Kofun period burial mounds. The site is about 20 minute walk from Makimuku Station on the JR West Sakurai Line.

== See also ==
- List of Historic Sites of Japan (Nara)
