= Monju-in Nishi Kofun =

Kofun period burial mound in Japan

- 文殊院西古墳 (Japanese)
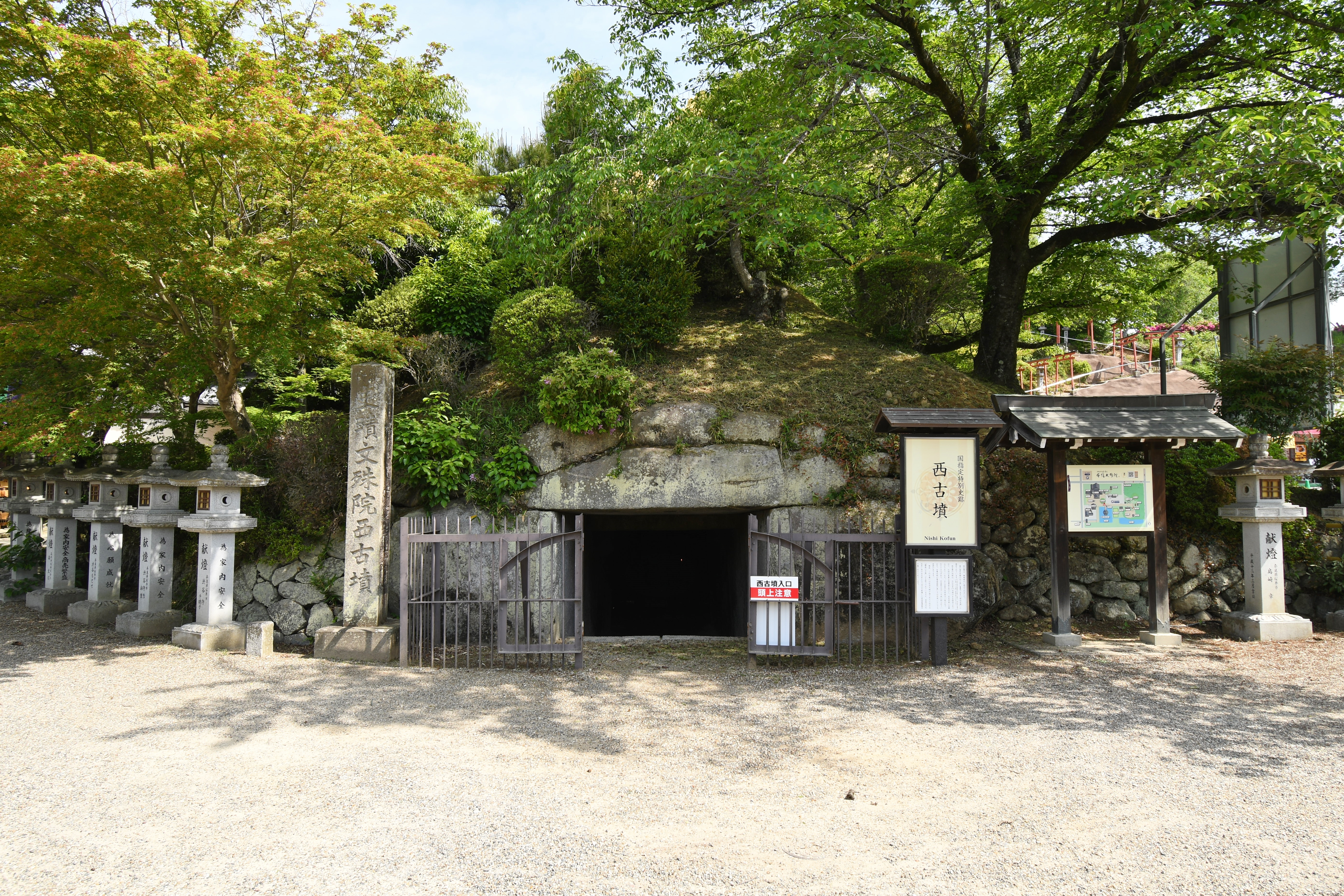
- Monju-in Nishi Kofun

- Monju-in Nishi Kofun Monju-in Nishi Kofun (Japan)
- Interactive map of Monju-in Nishi Kofun
- 34°30′14″N 135°50′33″E
- Type: Kofun
- Periods: Kofun period
- Location: Sakurai, Nara, Japan
- Region: Kansai region

History
- Built: c.7th century

Site notes
- Public access: Yes (no facilities)

Monju-in Nishi Kofun (文殊院西古墳) is an late Kofun period burial mound, located in the Takada neighborhood of the city of Sakurai, Nara in the Kansai region of Japan. The tumulus was designated a National Historic Site of Japan in 1923 and elevated to a Special National Historic Site in 1952.

== Overview ==
The Monju-in Nishi Kofun is located in the western end of the Abe Hills in the southern part of the Nara Basin, within the grounds of the Abe Monju-in temple. It is known that it was already open during the Muromachi period, and the tumulus has been leveled, leaving only the exposed burial chamber. No archaeological excavation has been carried out to date. The original shape of the tumulus is unclear, but it is estimated to be an enpun (円墳)-style circular tumulus with a diameter of about 25 to 30 meters and a height of about six meters. No fukiishi roofing stones or haniwa clay figures have been found. The burial chamber is orientated to the south, and is made of five tiers of dressed granite stones, with a huge monolith forming the ceiling. The center of the ceiling stone is shallowly dug into a dome shape to prevent water droplets that accumulate on the ceiling stone from falling onto the coffin. The 7.39 meter long passageway is lined with a single tier of huge stones. Traces of plaster remains on the walls. Grooves carved into the ceiling stone and side walls of the passageway opening, suggest the existence of a door between the passageway and burial chamber itself. No grave goods have been found at the site.

The construction date of the burial chamber is estimated to be around the second half of the 7th century, towards the end of the Kofun period. It is considered noteworthy for the craftsmanship of the cutting of the stone blocks used in the burial chamber. This tomb is certain to be the tomb of a powerful chief of the Abe clan, and the most likely theory is that the deceased was Abe no Kurahashimaro (Abe no Uchimaro, died in 649), who served as Sadaijin during the Taika Reforms in 645. Despite being the head of the government at the time, it is recorded that constructed a tomb on a scale that exceeded the regulations of the Taika Reforms, making his tomb a point of contention.

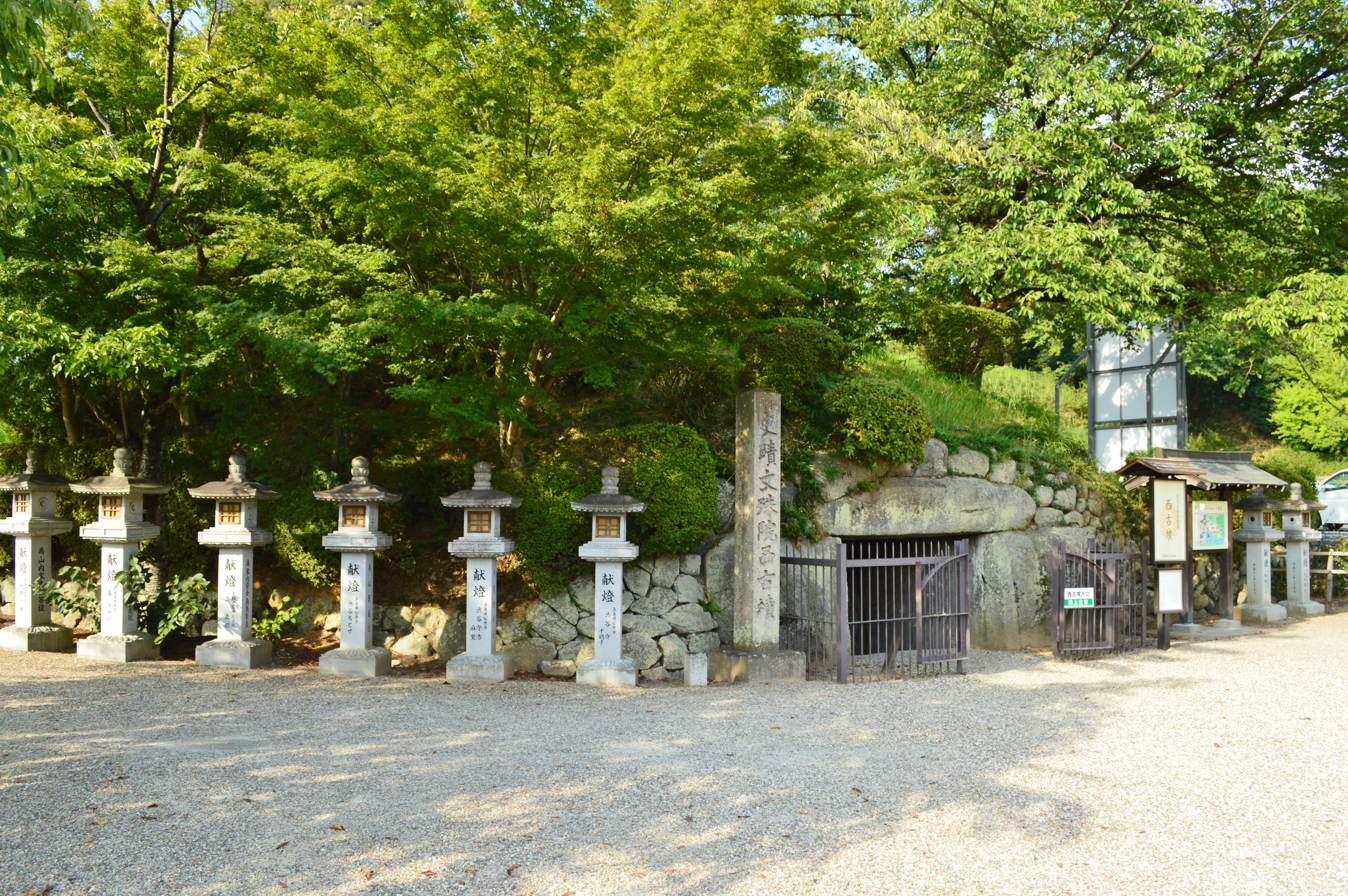
Kofun

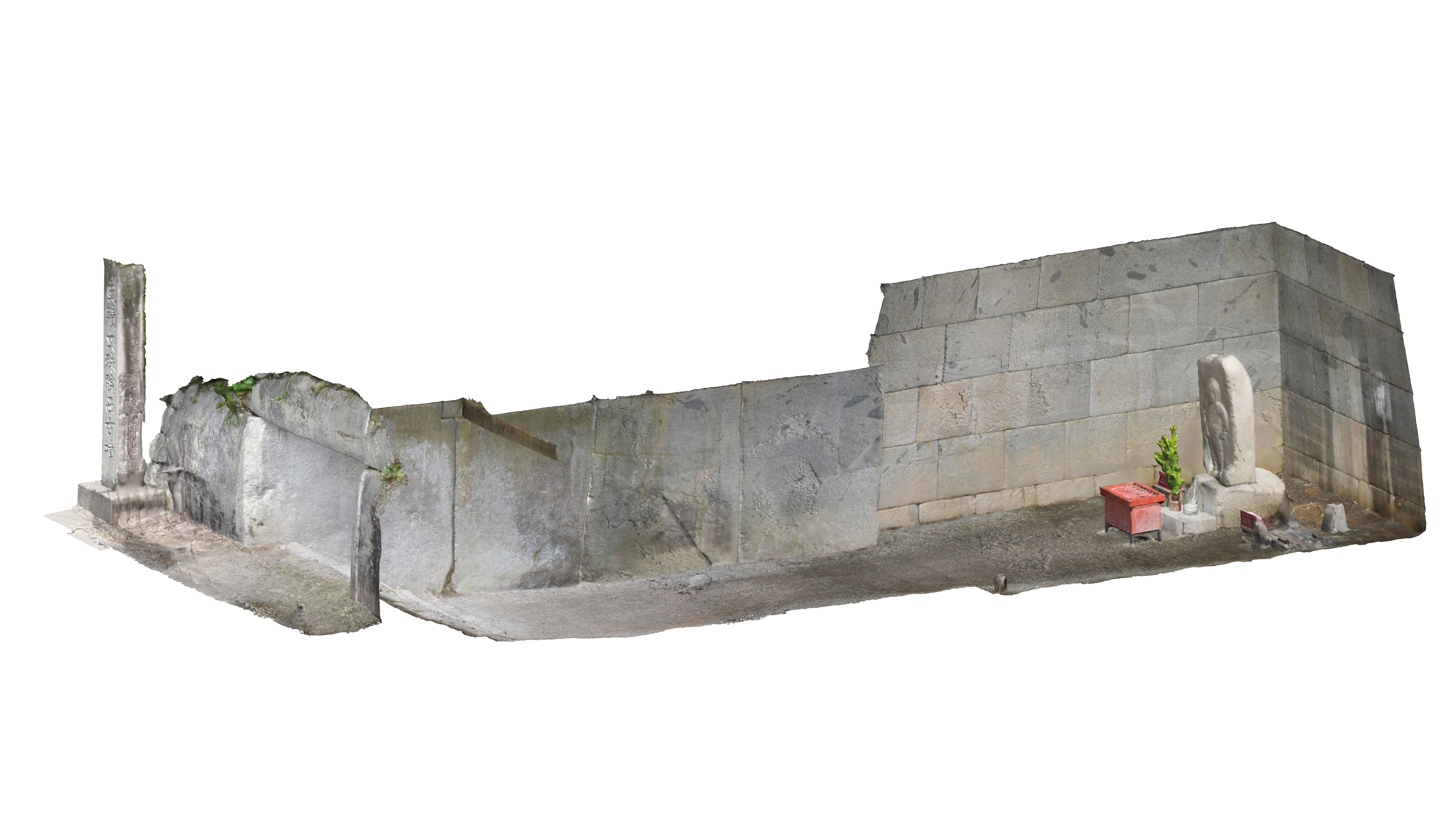
3D image of burial chamber

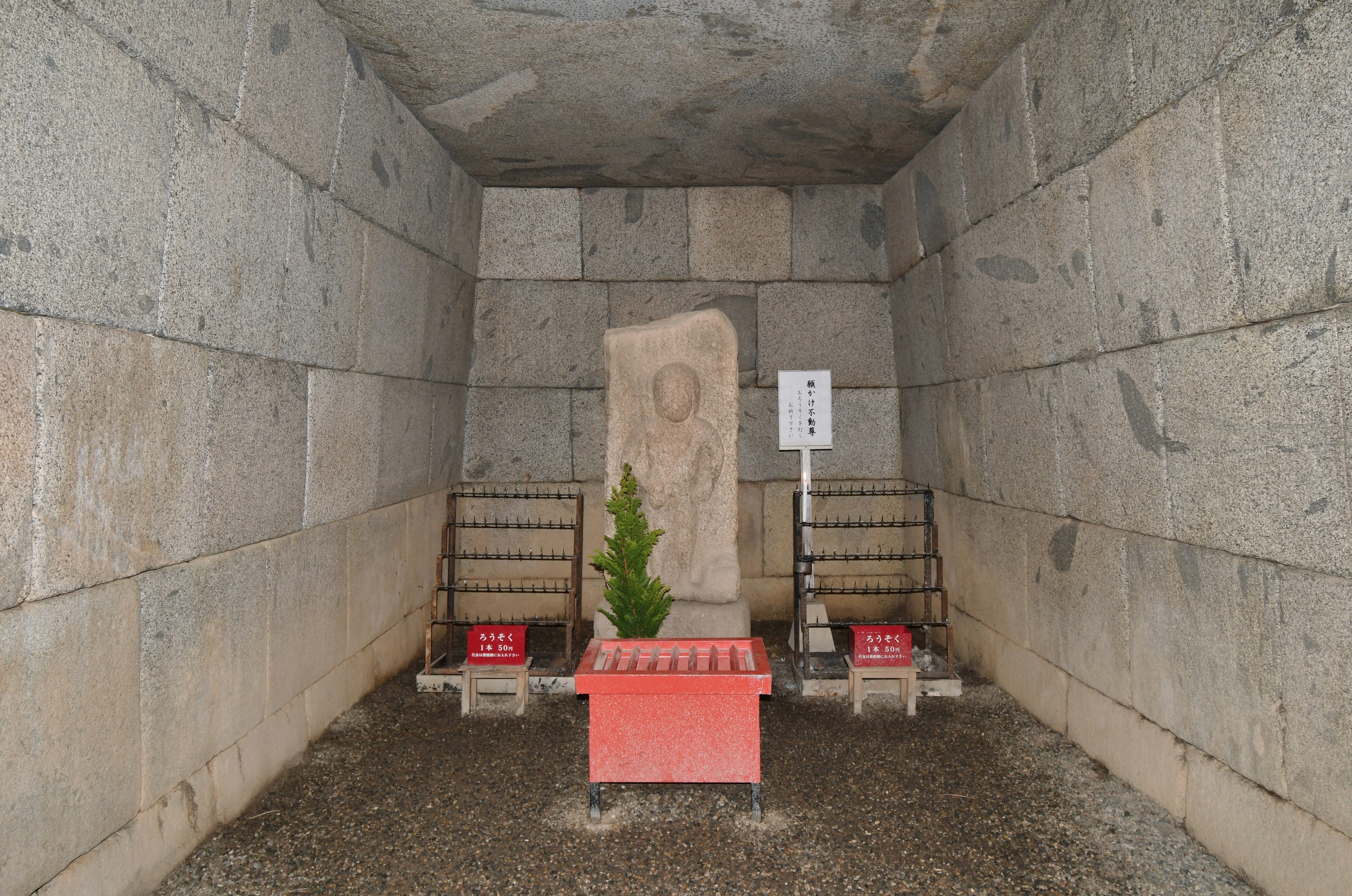
The burial chamber (towards the back wall)）

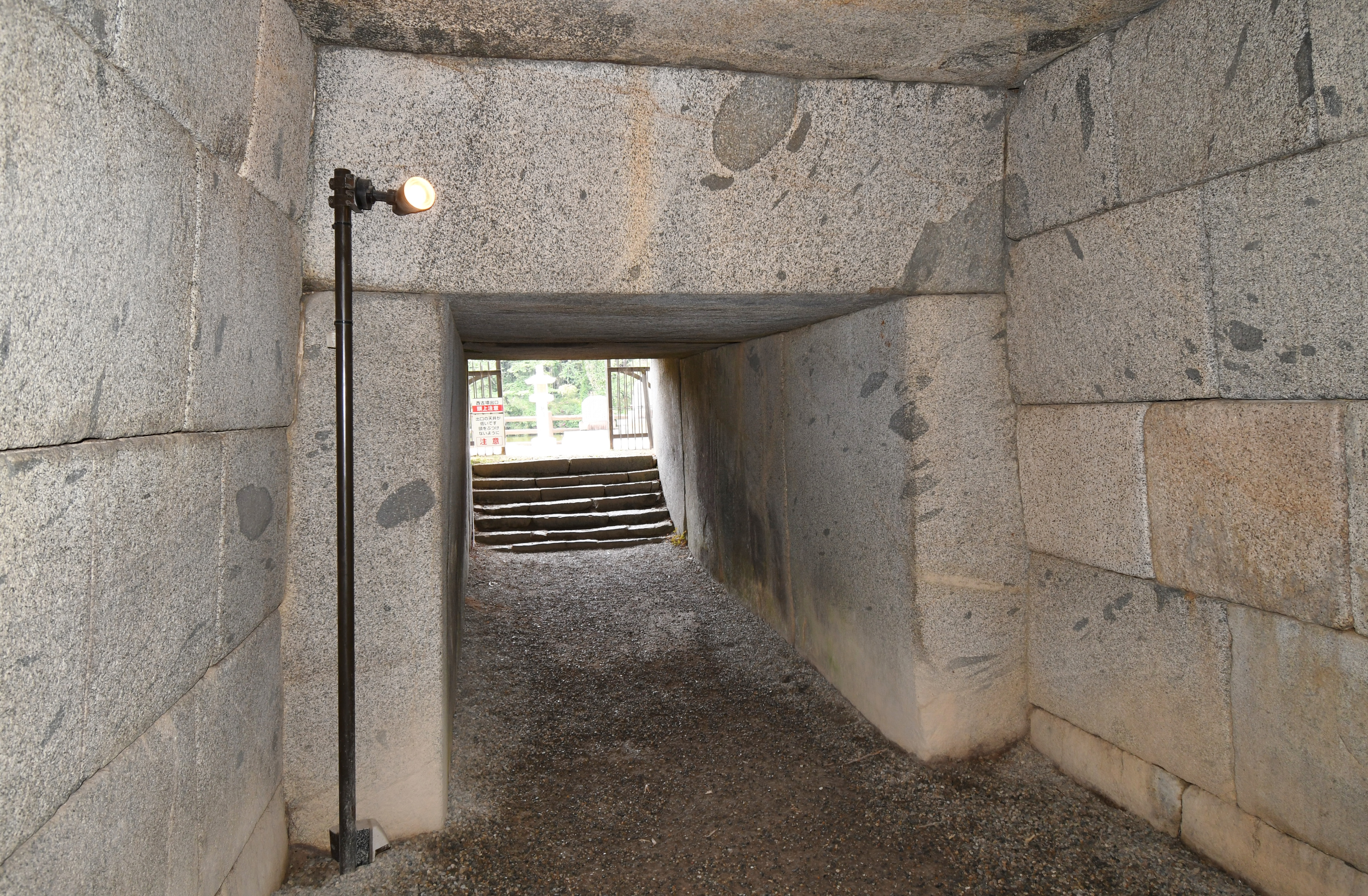
The burial chamber (towards the passageway)

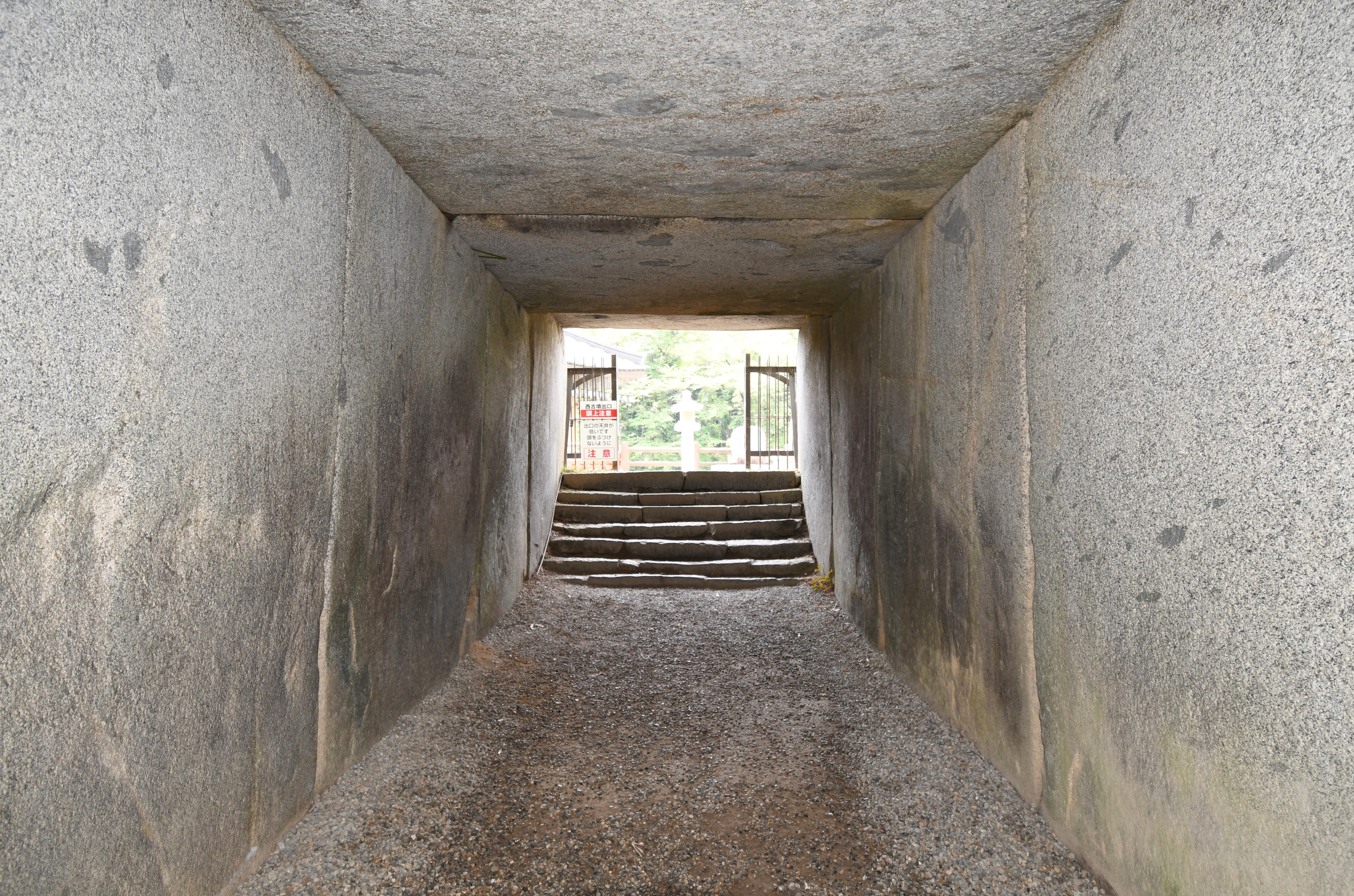
Passageway (towards the entrance)

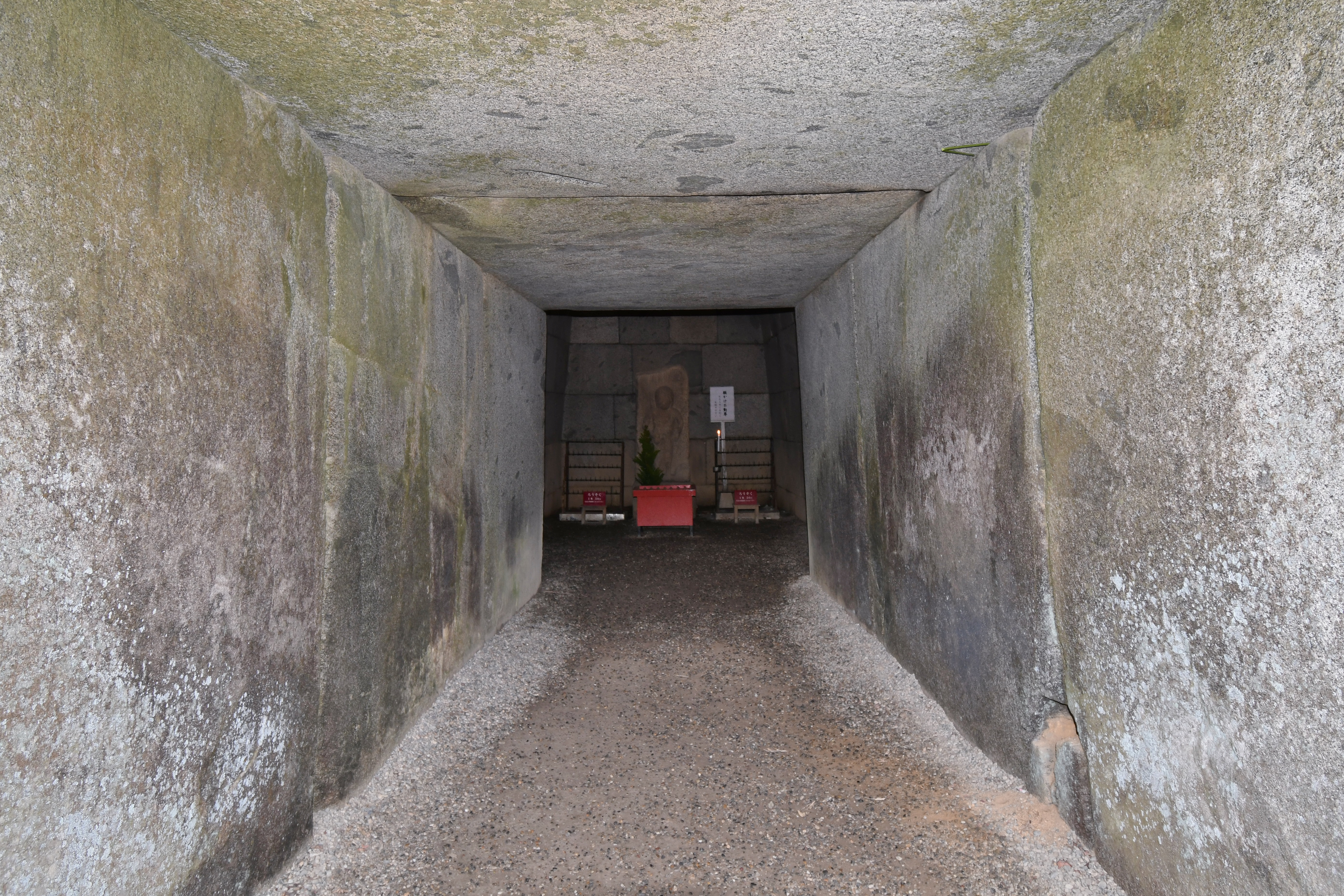
Passageway (towards the burial chamber)

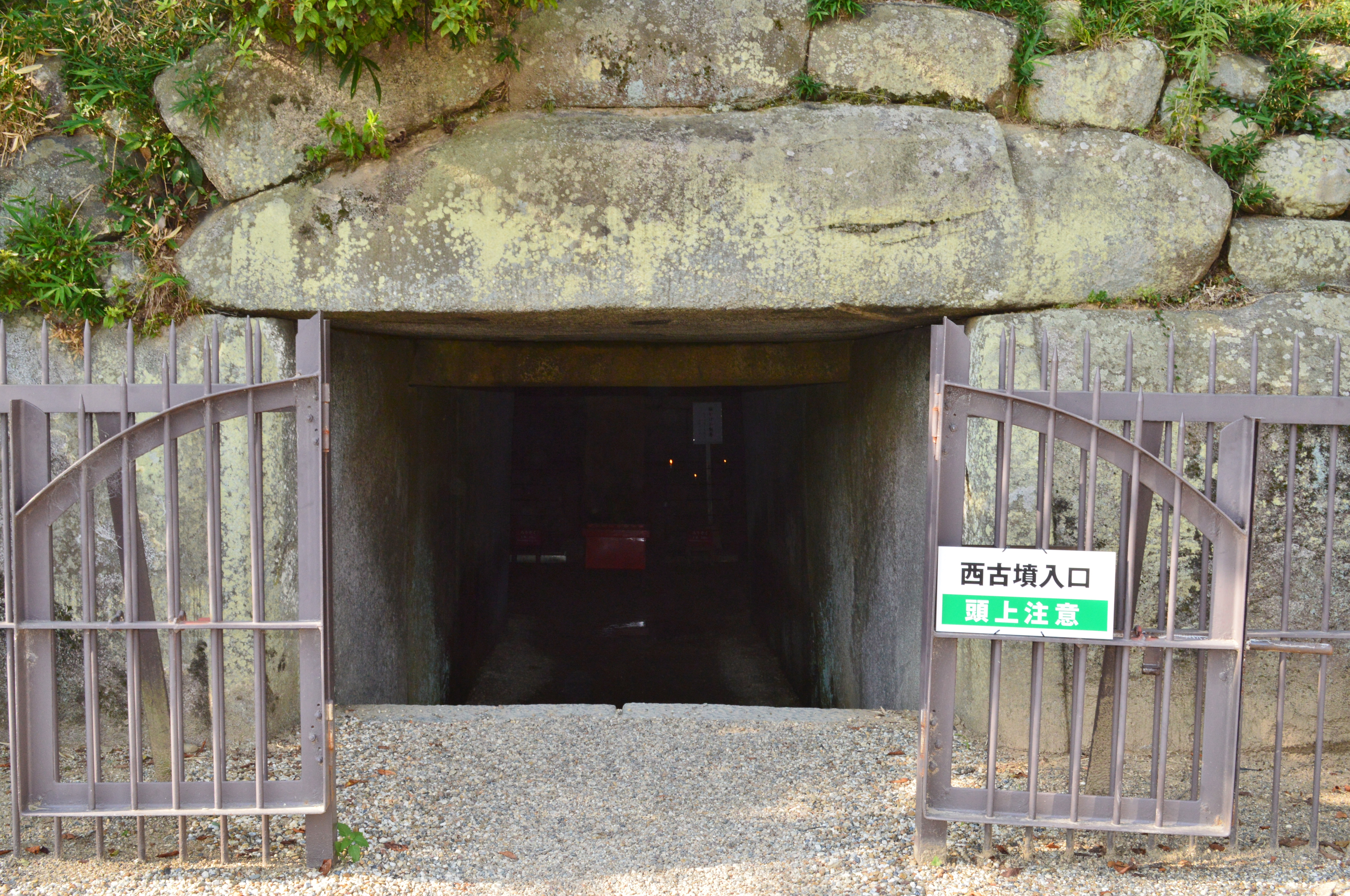
Entry

In addition, there are stones of the same shape as the burial chamber scattered around the grounds of Abe Monjuiin, suggesting the possibility that a similar stone chamber burial mound may have existed apart from this burial mound.

The tumulus is about 1.5 kilometers south of Sakurai Station on the Kintetsu Railway Osaka Line.

== See also ==
- List of Historic Sites of Japan (Nara)
