= Makimuku =

Makimuku may refer to:

- Makimuku ruins
- Makimuku Station
