= Abe-dera =

Buddhist temple in Sakurai, Nara Prefecture, Japan

- 安倍寺
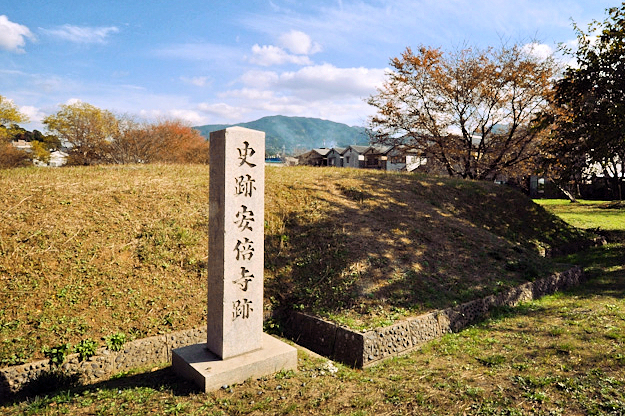
- Abe-dera ruins

- Location within Nara Prefecture Location within Japan

Religion
- Affiliation: Buddhist
- Status: ruins

Location
- Location: Sakurai, Nara
- Country: Japan
- Coordinates: 34°30′05″N 135°50′23″E

Architecture
- Completed: c.645

Abe-dera (安倍寺) was a Buddhist temple established during the Asuka period in the city of Sakurai, Nara Prefecture, Japan. The temple no longer exists, and its ruins have been protected as a designated a National Historic Site since 1970.

== Overview ==
The temple ruins are located on the west side of an ancient road connecting the capital at Asuka with Sakurai. The ruins are about 300 meters southwest of the well-known Abe Monju-in, and the entire area is said to have been the home of the Abe clan. According to the Nihon Shoki, the Abe were descendants of Emperor Kōgen, the legendary 8th emperor of Japan. Per early 12th-century records at Tōdai-ji, Abe-dera was founded in 645 AD as the Abe clan bodaiji by Abe no Kurahashi, the Sadaijin at the time of the Taika Reform. Nothing is known of the subsequent history of the temple, and it appears to have fallen into decline at the end of the Heian period, and was relocated to the Abe Monju-in at after a fire in the Kamakura period.

Archaeological excavations conducted in 1965 discovered that the temple site was 200 meters square, with the temple buildings orientated to the south. The layout of the temple was patterned after Hōryū-ji in Ikaruga, with the foundation platform for the Main Hall in the east and a 15-meters square foundation platform for a pagoda in the west. The Lecture Hall was to the north, with a corridor connecting the Lecture Hall to the Middle Gate. The ruins of flat kiln adjacent to the north edge of the temple compound dates to the Kamakura period, and it is possible that tiles for the construction of Abe Monju-in were fired here.

The remains also include a square platform known traditionally as the "Nakamaro Yashiki", a long platform running north-south from the platform, and a triangular platform to the northwest of the eastern platform. This "Nakamaro" may refer to the famous Abe no Nakamaro, who was on the 717 Japanese mission to Tang China. Excavated artifacts include Yamada-dera-style round eaves roof tiles with single-petal lotus motifs and woven arabesque patterns, presumed to date from the temple's founding period, as well as earthenware, plain-patterned bronze mirrors and gold rings, with most of the artifacts dating from the mid-7th century to the Heian period. A rare find is a Tang dynasty sancai animal foot (foot attached to a jar), of which only a few examples are known in Japan

At present, the foundations of the tower, main hall, and corridor have been restored and maintained as a historic park.

== See also ==
- List of Historic Sites of Japan (Nara)
