= Tennōzan Kofun (Sakurai) =

Kofun period keyhole-shaped burial mound in Japan

Akasaka Tennōzan Kofun
- 赤坂天王山古墳 (Japanese)
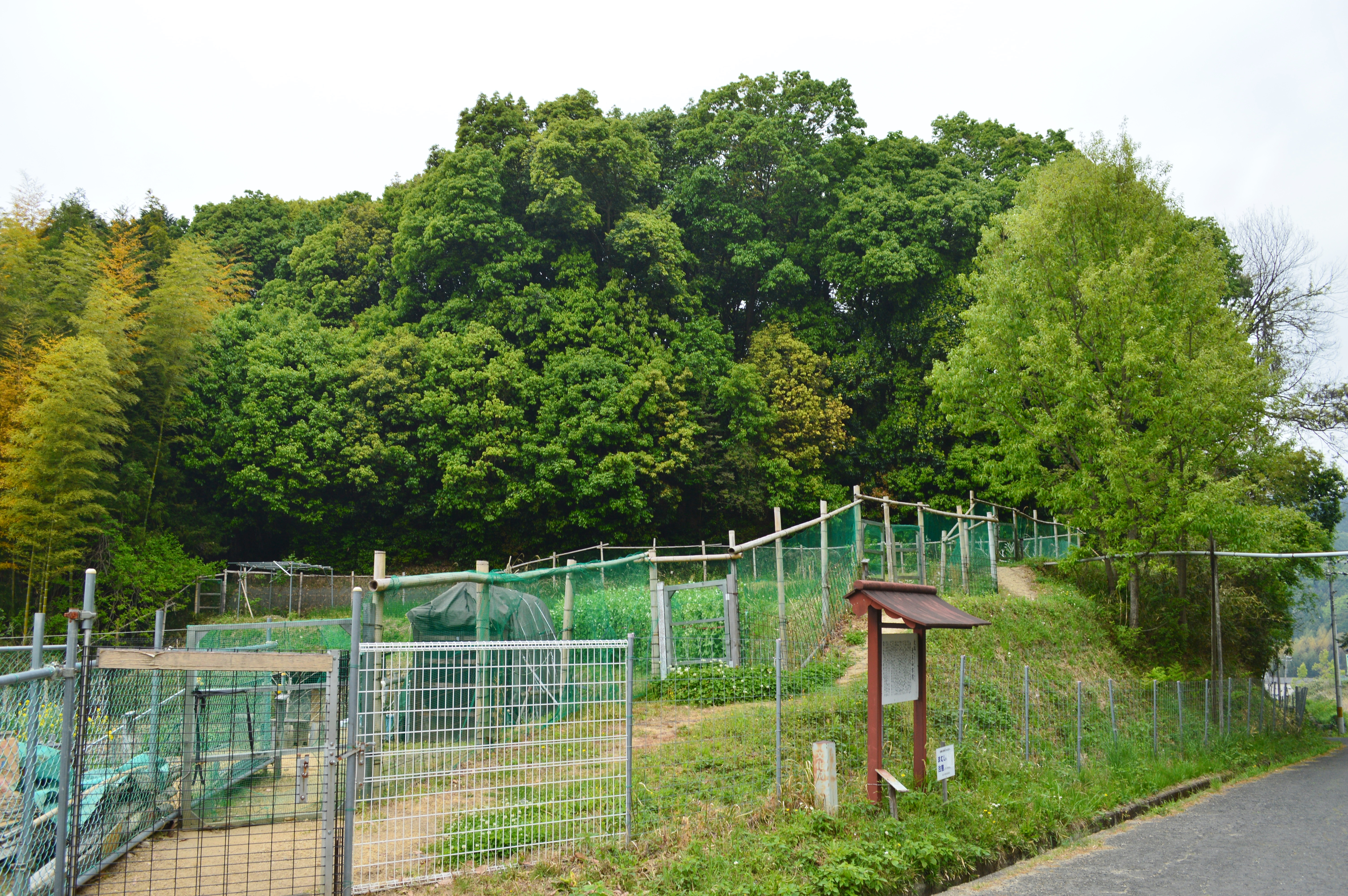
- Akasaka Tennōzan Kofun

- Akasaka Tennōzan Kofunn Tennōzan Kofun (Sakurai) (Japan)
- Interactive map of Akasaka Tennōzan Kofun
- 34°30′1.5″N 135°52′28.5″E
- Type: Kofun
- Periods: Kofun period
- Location: Sakurai, Nara, Japan
- Region: Kansai region

History
- Built: c.6th century

Site notes
- Public access: Yes (no facilities)

Tennōzan Kofun (天王山古墳) is a Kofun period burial mound, located in the Kurahashi neighborhood of the city of Sakurai, Nara in the Kansai region of Japan. The tumulus was designated a National Historic Site of Japan in 1954. It is only of several sites claiming to be the grave of Emperor Sushun. It is also called the Akasaka Tennōzan Kofun (赤坂天王山古墳).

== Overview ==
The Tennōzan Kofun is a hōfun (方墳)-style rectangular tumulus located at the tip of a ridge extending northwest of Mount Tonomine, near the left bank of the Oubara River. The mound is built in three tiers. The shape of the mound is rhomboidal, with the northern side approximately 50.5 meters, the southern side 43.2 meters, the eastern side 46.5 meters, and the western side is about 47 meters. The top is a flat area about 10 meters on each side. The slopes of each step are covered with fukiishi roofing stones, but no haniwa have been found. The burial chamber consists of a passageway and an antechamber, with a stone sarcophagus placed in the center of the antechamber, slightly toward the back wall. The burial chamber is made of natural granite, and corbels can be seen on the walls of the chamber. The floor is paved with gravel, and a blocking stone remains at the entrance to the passage. The total length is over 15.3 meters, and the burial chamber is about 3 to 3.2 meters wide and over 4.2 meters high. The back wall is made of a megalith over two meters high and two more megaliths about one meter high, stacked in three tiers. The left and right walls are also stacked in three tiers, with pebbles placed in the gaps. The sarcophagus is about 2.4 meters long, 1.7 meters wide, and 1.1 meters high. The lid of the sarcophagus, made of tuff from Mount Nijō, is shaped like a house, with rope protrusions on the front, back, left and right. The body is a hollowed-out box with a square carving with sides of 48 centimeters from the lid to the body, slightly left of the center, and a small window. There is also a small square hole drilled in the upper edge of the body facing the passage, possibly by grave robbers in antiquity. The tumulus has been surveyed, but has not been excavated, but there do not appear to be any surviving grave goods. However, the burial chamber structure and the style of the stone coffin suggest that the tumulus was built between the end of the 6th century and the beginning of the 7th century.

Emperor Sushun (c.552 - c.592) was the only emperor of Japan known with certainty to have been assassinated. The details of this incident are given in the Nihon Shoki, which also states that his tomb was located in "Kurahashi". However, in the early Heian period Engishiki records state that the location of his tomb was unknown. However, Imperial family records gave the location as the temple of Konpuku-ji, located about 1.7 kilometers southwest, which was built on the site of Emperor Sushun's Kurahashi Shibagaki-no-miya palace, and which contains Emperor Sushun's ihai memorial tablet. Until the Meiji period, the Tennōzan Kofun was regarded as the emperor's tomb: however, when the early Meiji period Imperial Household Agency designated various kofun as "imperial graves", as small enpun (円墳)-style tumulus near the temple was arbitrary determined to be the "official" tomb of Emperor Sushun. Several noted archaeologists and scholars, including Koichi Mori, have asserted that the much larger Tennōzan Kofun has a far better claim to that title, although other candidates exist, including the Fujinoki Tomb in Ikaruga, Nara.

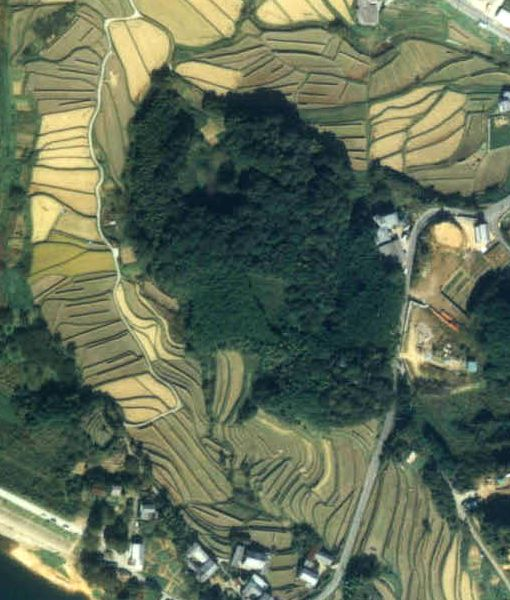
Aerial photo

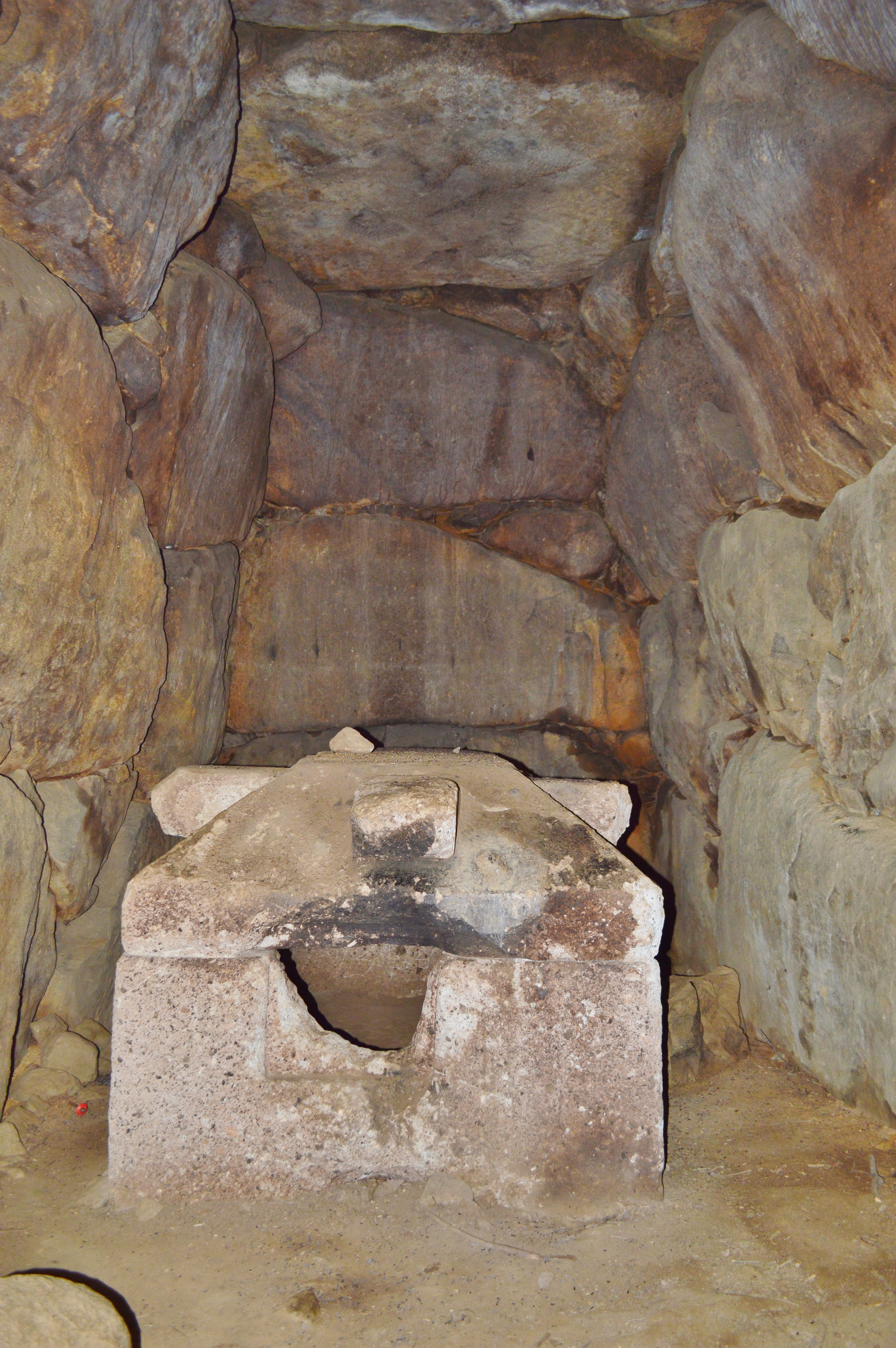
Burial Chamber

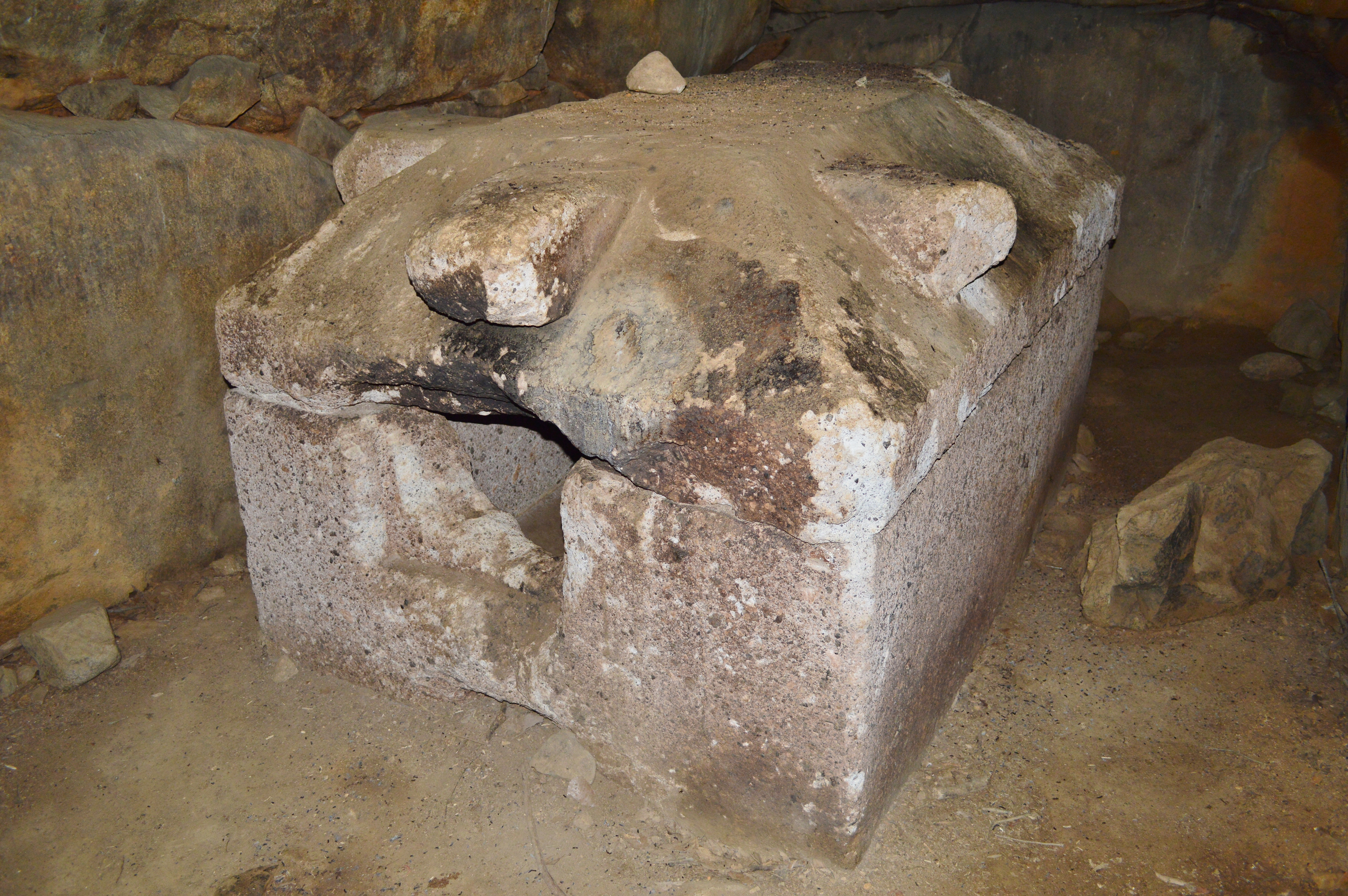
Sarcophagus

The tumulus is about 30 minutes on foot from Sakurai Station on the Kintetsu Railway Osaka Line.

== See also ==
- List of Historic Sites of Japan (Nara)
