= Sakurai, Nara =

Sakurai 桜井市
- City
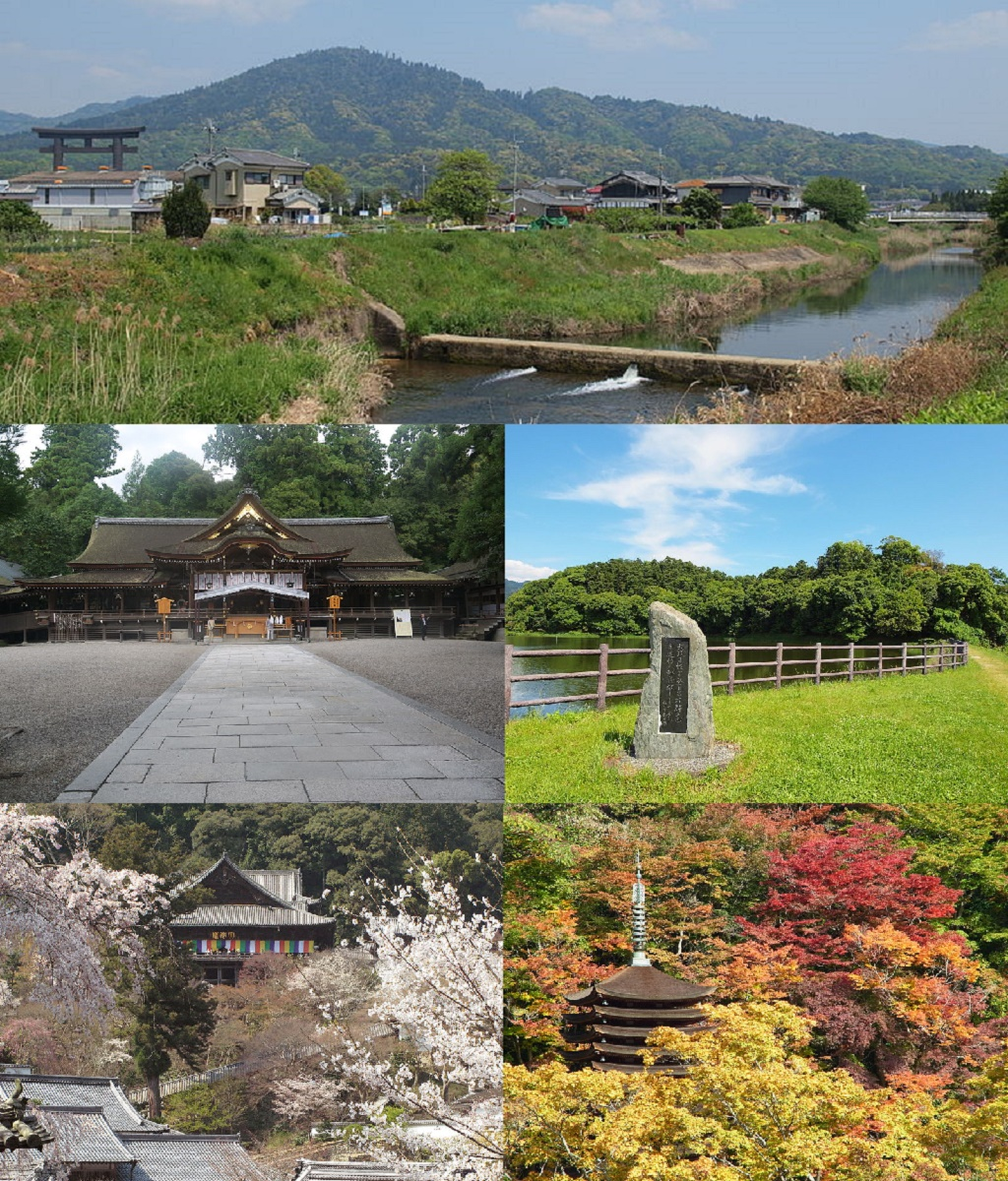
- Top: A panorama view of Mount Miwa and Yamato River, Second: Ōmiwa Shrine, a heritage site of Hashihaka Tomb, Bottom: Hase Temple, Tanzan Shrine (all item from left to right)

- Flag Emblem of Cherry Blossom

- Location of Sakurai in Nara Prefecture

- Coordinates: 34°31′07″N 135°50′36″E
- Country: Japan
- Region: Kansai
- Prefecture: Nara
- Village established: April 1, 1889
- Town established: November 18, 1890
- City established: September 1, 1956

Government
  - Mayor: Masatake Matsui（松井正芳） - from December 2011

Area
  - Total: 98.91 km^{2} (38.19 sq mi)

Population (October 31, 2024)
  - Total: 54,384
  - Density: 549.8/km^{2} (1,424/sq mi)
- Time zone: UTC+9 (Japan Standard Time)
- Phone number: 0744-42-9111
- Address: 432-1, Odono, Sakurai-shi, Nara-ken 633-8585
- Website: Official website
- Symbols
- Flower: Prunus jamasakura
- Tree: Cryptomeria

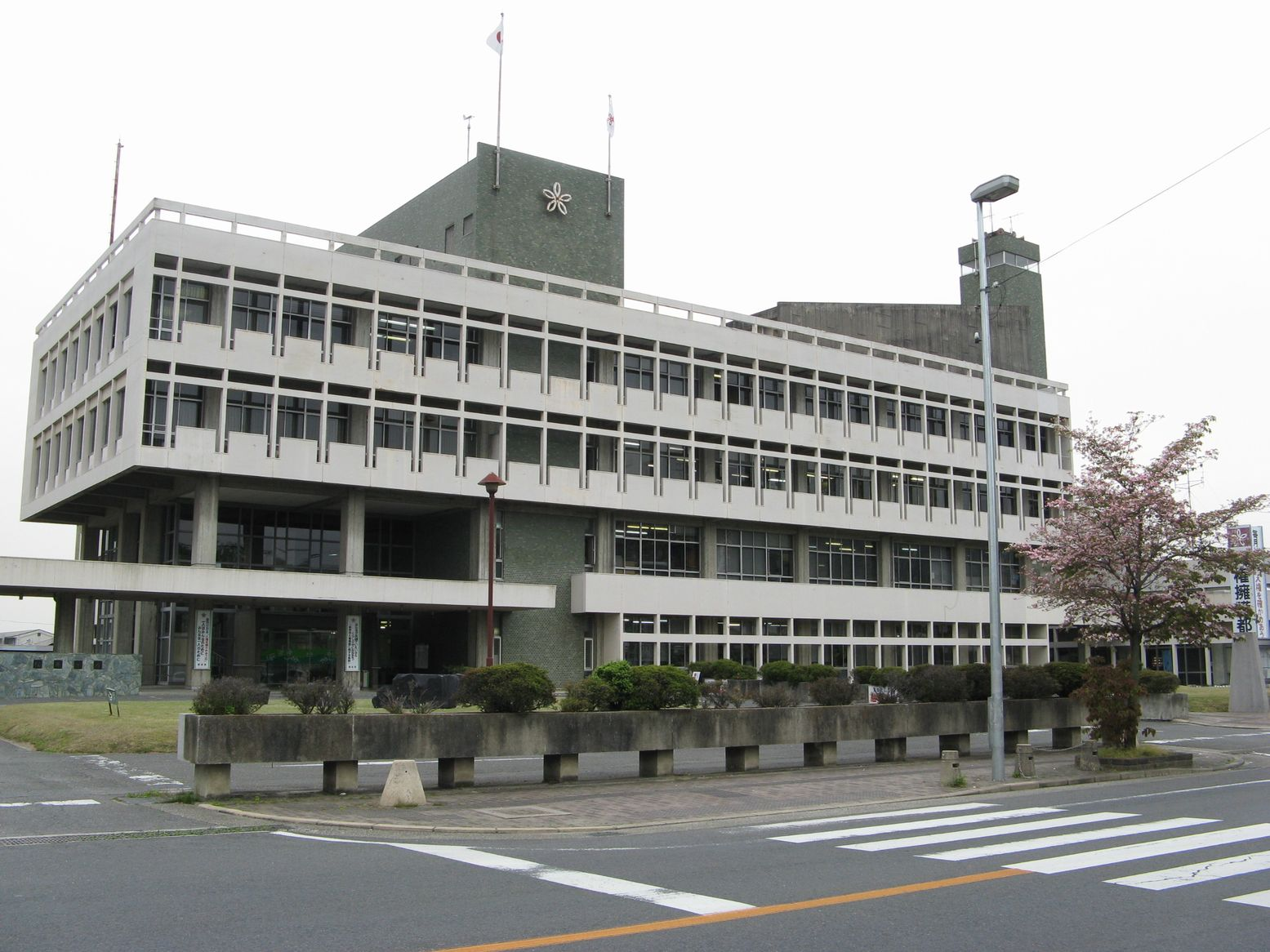
Sakurai City Hall

Sakurai (桜井市, Sakurai-shi; lit. 'Well of Cherry Blossom Flower') is a city located in Nara Prefecture, Japan. As of 31 August 2024, the city had an estimated population of 54,384 in 25678 households, and a population density of 550 persons per km^{2}. The total area of the city is 98.91 km^{2} (38.19 sq mi).

== Geography ==
Sakurai is located in central Nara Prefecture. The western and northern parts of the city are located southeast of the Nara Basin, and are relatively flat rural areas with the Terakawa and Hatsusegawa (Yamatogawa) rivers flowing through them. The urban area is centered around Sakurai Station and Miwa Station, and along National Route 165. The Ryumon Mountains cover the southern and eastern parts of the city,

=== Neighboring municipalities ===
Nara Prefecture

- Nara
- Kashihara
- Tenri
- Uda
- Tawaramoto
- Asuka
- Yoshino

=== Climate ===
Sakurai has a humid subtropical climate (Köppen Cfa) characterized by warm summers and cool winters with light to no snowfall. The average annual temperature in Sakurai is 14.2 °C. The average annual rainfall is 1636 mm with September as the wettest month. The temperatures are highest on average in August, at around 26.4 °C, and lowest in January, at around 2.7 °C.

=== Demographics ===
Per Japanese census data, the population of Sakurai is as shown below

Historical population
Year	Pop.	±%
1960	47,752	—
1970	52,081	+9.1%
1980	56,439	+8.4%
1990	60,262	+6.8%
2000	63,248	+5.0%
2010	60,146	−4.9%
2020	54,857	−8.8%

== History ==
Sakurai is part of ancient Yamato Province. Fragments of pottery from the Jomon and Yayoi periods can be found in ordinary fields, indicating that the area has been settled for many thousands of years. Many ancient burial mounds, such as zenpokoenfun from the Kofun periods, indicate that this was central region of the Yamato dynasty, and its predecessor, the Miwa dynasty. It was briefly the capital of Japan during the reign of Emperor Yūryaku. The life of the Imperial court was centered at Hatsuse no Asakura Palace where the emperor lived in 457–479. Other emperors also built palaces in the area, including

- Iware no Mikakuri Palace, 480–484 in reign of Emperor Seinei
- Nimiki Palace, 499–506 in reign of Emperor Buretsu
- Iware no Tamaho Palace, 526–532 in reign of Emperor Keitai
- Hinokuma no Iorino Palace, 535-539 in reign of Emperor Senka
- Osata no Sakitama Palace or Osada no Miya, 572–585 in reign of Emperor Bidatsu

The village of Sakurai was established on April 1, 1889 with the creation of the modern municipalities system. It was raised to town status on November 1, 1890. Sakurai annexed the villages of Jojima in 1942 and Abe, Tonomine and Asakura in 1954. On September 1, 1956 Sakurai annexed Daifuku and Kaguyama and was raised to city status.

== Government ==
Sakurai has a mayor-council form of government with a directly elected mayor and a unicameral city council of 16 members. Sakurai contributes two members to the Nara Prefectural Assembly. In terms of national politics, the city is part of the Nara 3rd district of the lower house of the Diet of Japan.

== Economy ==
As it is a distribution center for lumber from all over Nara Prefecture, the lumber industry is thriving, and lumber is actively promoted through exhibitions of wood products and wood workshops. Agriculture is also important to the local economy and the area is also famous as a mandarin orange production area.

== Education ==
Sakurai has 11 public elementary schools and four public junior high schools operated by the city government and two public high schools operated by the Nara Prefectural Board of Education.

== Transportation ==
=== Railways ===
JR West - Sakurai Line (Manyō-Mahoroba Line)

U Makimuku - Miwa - Sakurai

Kintetsu Railway - Osaka Line

Sakurai - Yamato-Asakura - Hasedera

=== Highways ===
- National Route 165
- National Route 166
- National Route 169

== Sister cities ==
- Kumano, Mie, Japan
- Taisha, Shimane, Japan
- Chartres, France

== Local attractions ==
Sakurai is home to Ōmiwa Shrine, traditionally considered one of the oldest Shinto shrines in Japan dedicated to the god of sake. Sake dealers across Japan often hang a wooden sugi ball, made at Ōmiwa Shrine, as a talisman to the god of sake. It was featured in Yukio Mishima's novel Runaway Horses.

== Famous places ==
- Buddhist temples
  - Abe Monju-in
  - Asuka-dera
  - Hase-dera
  - Miwasanbyōdō-ji
  - Seirin-ji
  - Tachibana-dera
- Shinto shrines
  - Kasayamakō Shrine
  - Ōmiwa Shrine
  - Tamatsura Shrine
  - Tanzan Shrine
- National Historic Sites
  - Yamada-dera ruins
  - Monju-in Nishi Kofun
  - Mesuriyama Kofun
  - Ōbara-dera ruins
  - Abe-dera ruins
  - Hanayamazuka Kofun
  - Chihara Ōbaka Kofun
  - Kibi-ike temple ruins
  - Sakurai Chausuyama Kofun
  - Tamakiyama Kofun Cluster
  - Tennōzan Kofun
  - Makimuku Site
  - Makimuku Kofun Cluster
  - Kusabaka Kofun
  - Hashihaka Kofun
