= Hanayamazuka Kofun =

Kofun period burial mound in Japan

- 花山塚古墳 (Japanese)
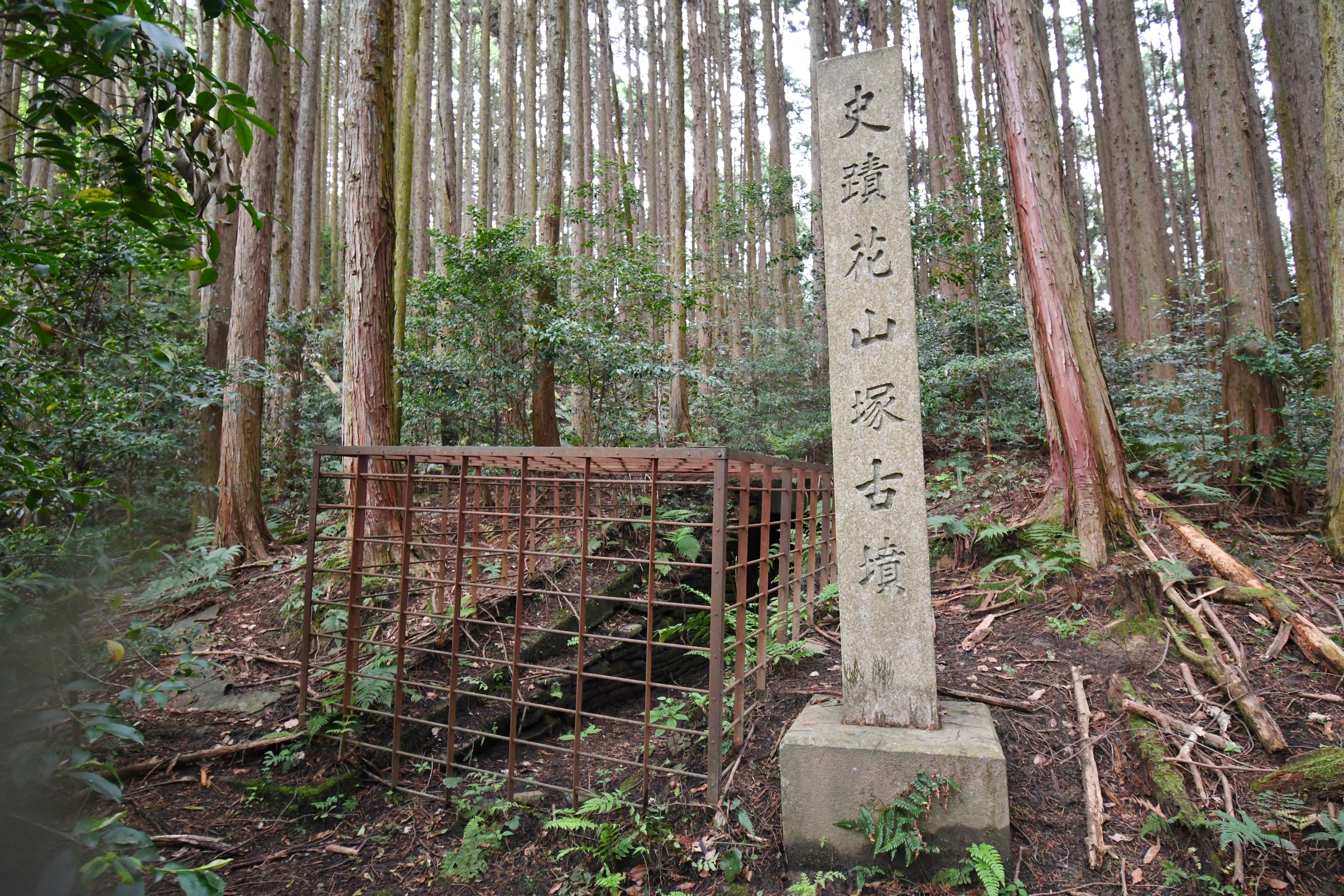
- Hanayamazuka Kofun

- Hanayamazuka Kofun Hanayamazuka Kofun (Japan)
- Interactive map of Hanayamazuka Kofun
- 34°30′28.80″N 135°54′24.25″E
- Type: Kofun
- Periods: Kofun period
- Location: Sakurai, Nara, Japan
- Region: Kansai region

History
- Built: c.7th century

Site notes
- Public access: Yes (no facilities)

Hanayamazuka Kofun (花山塚古墳) is a Kofun period burial mound, located in the Awahara neighborhood of the city of Sakurai, Nara in the Kansai region of Japan. The tumulus was designated a National Historic Site of Japan in 1927. It is also referred to as the Hanayama Nishizuka Kofun (花山西塚古墳).

== Overview ==
Hanayamazuka Kofun is located on the slope of a ridge near Meyori Pass, on the southeastern edge of the Nara Basin. There are a considerable number of tumuli along the road leading to Uda from Udatsuji in Sakurai City, via Meyori Pass, and the area around Awahara in particular was known as an area dotted with tumuli from the end of the Kofun period. This tumulus is located at the very back of Awahara Valley, and there are no other obvious tumuli within a 500 meter radius of it. The tumulus is located on the southern slope of a hill at an altitude of about 450 meters.

The tumulus was constructed by digging into the slope of a hill in a horseshoe shape and shaping it. The shape of the tumulus is unclear due to leveling, but it is believed to be an enpun (円墳)-style circular tumulus with a diameter of 16 meters. The burial facility is a horizontal-entry stone burial chamber orientated to the south. The passageway is three meters long and 1.1 meters wide, and is open to the sky as the mound and ceiling stones in this area have been lost. The burial chamber consists of an antechamber 2.18 by 1.36 meters with a 1.68 meter height and an inner chamber of 2 meters by 0.7 meters with a height of one meter.The walls are constructed by stacking quartz trachyte processed into bricks and solidifying it with plaster. The side walls of the antechamber are vertical up to about 1.2 meters, and are corbeled above that. Two granite ceiling stones remain. The bottom of the inner chamber was paved with slabs of stone, and the opening had a stone door (a hole for the axis remains on the left side of the inner chamber). Currently, the door stone is on the floor in front of the inner chamber, but it was used as a stepping stone at a nearby elementary school, but it was returned when it was discovered to be from this tumulus. The walls of the burial chamber and inner chamber appear to have been completely covered with plaster. The stone sarcophagus is also highly unusual in that it is made of bricks. Similar examples of brick coffin-style tumuli are known in the Uda region, but since there are similarities with brick coffin tumuli of Baekje and Goguryeo on the Korean Peninsula, it is assumed to be the tomb of a powerful toraijin immigrant. No grave goods have been found, as the tumulus has been open since antiquity, but the construction date is estimated to be around the latter half of the 7th century, at the end of the Kofun period.

The tumulus is about 6.6 kilometers east from Sakurai Station on the JR West Sakurai Line.

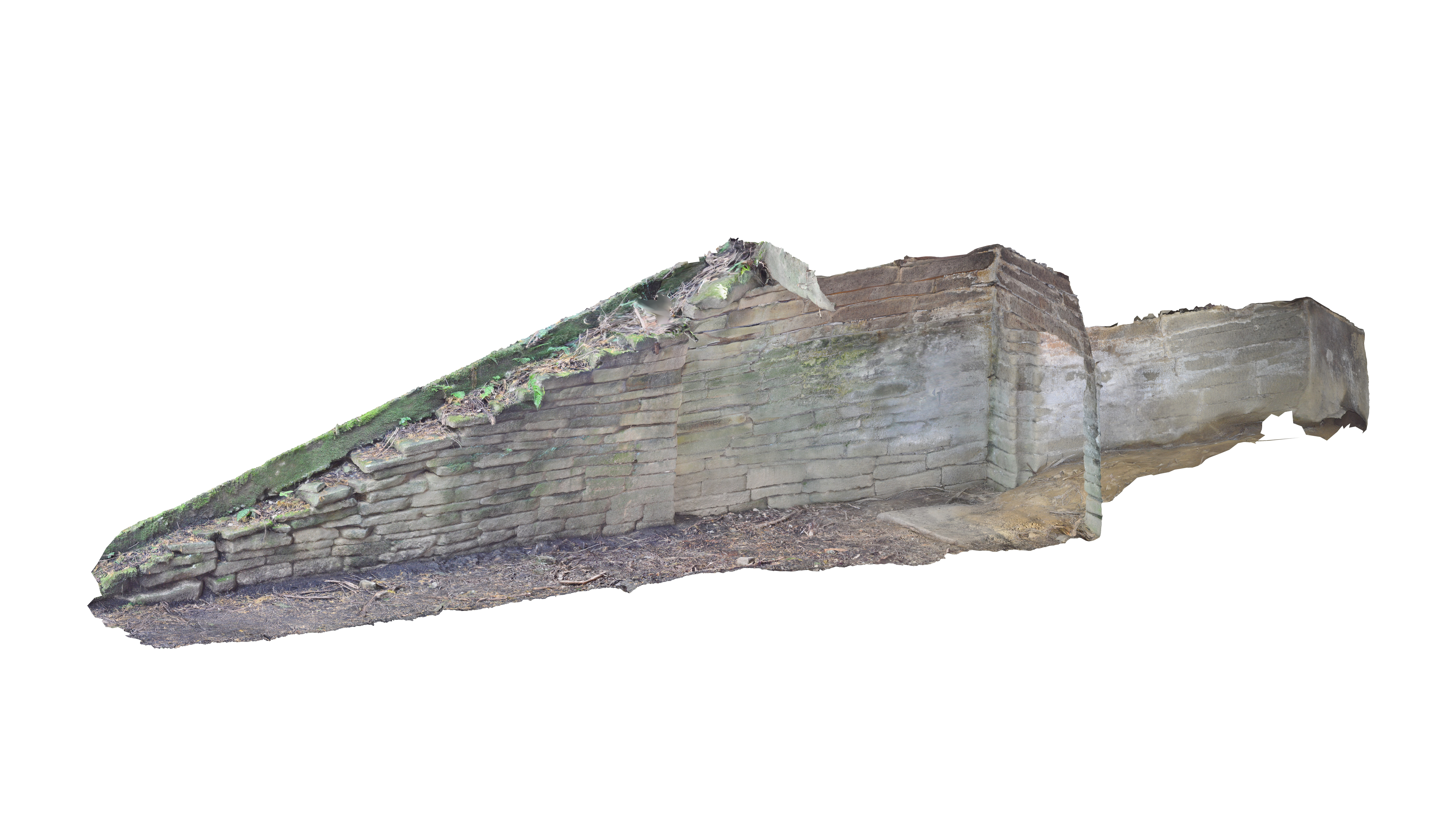
3D rendition

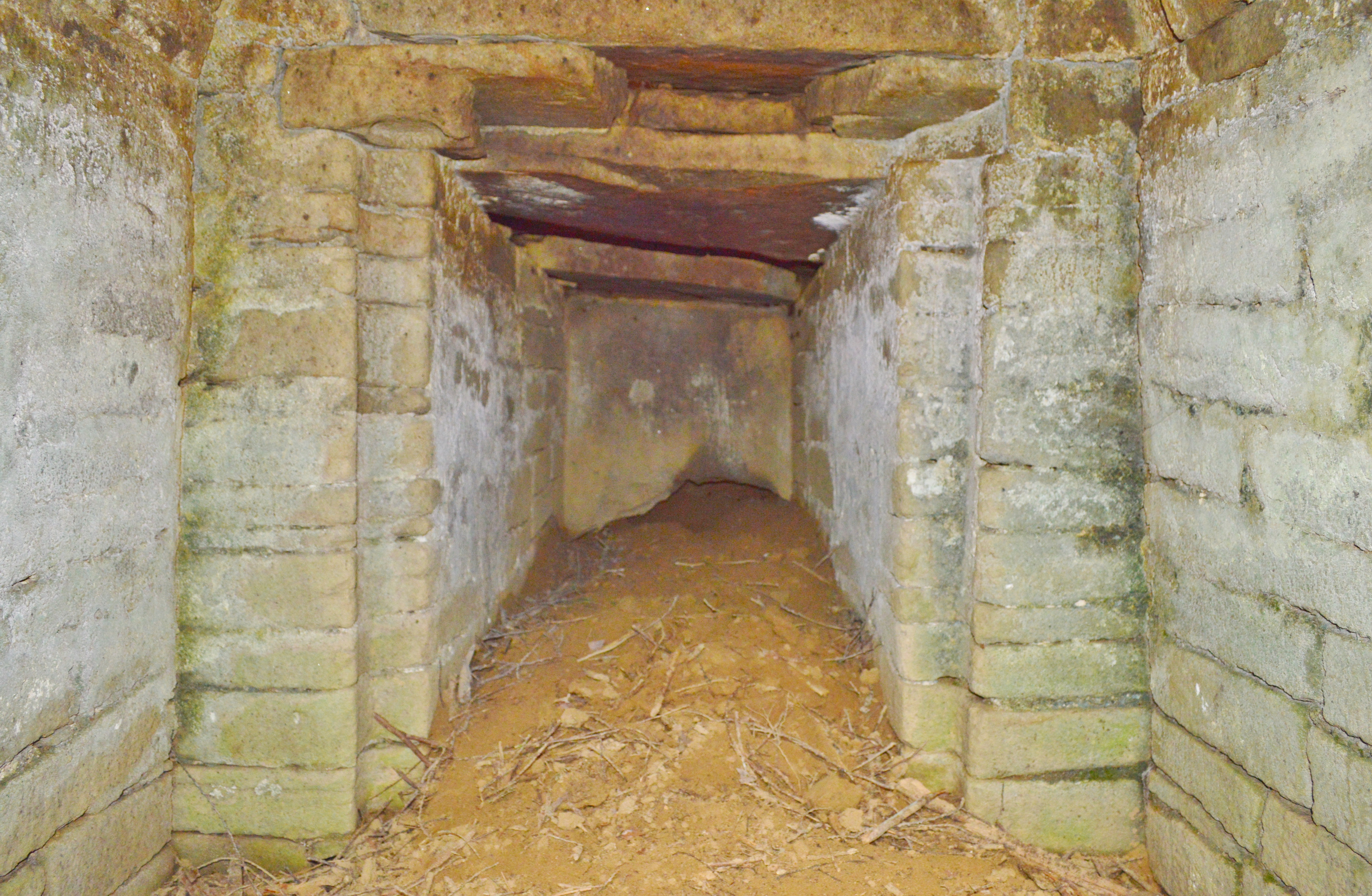
Inner Chamber

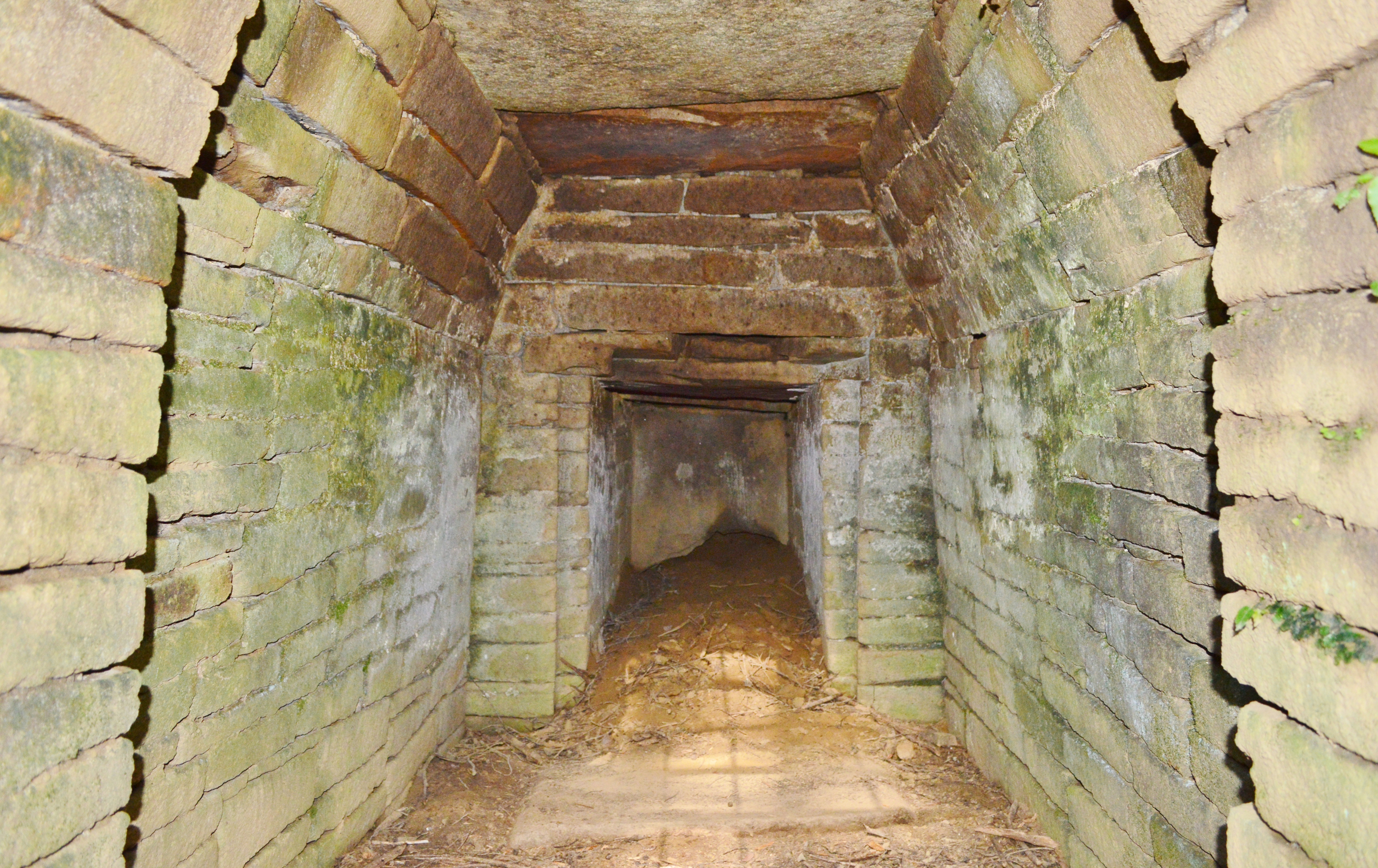
Antechamber

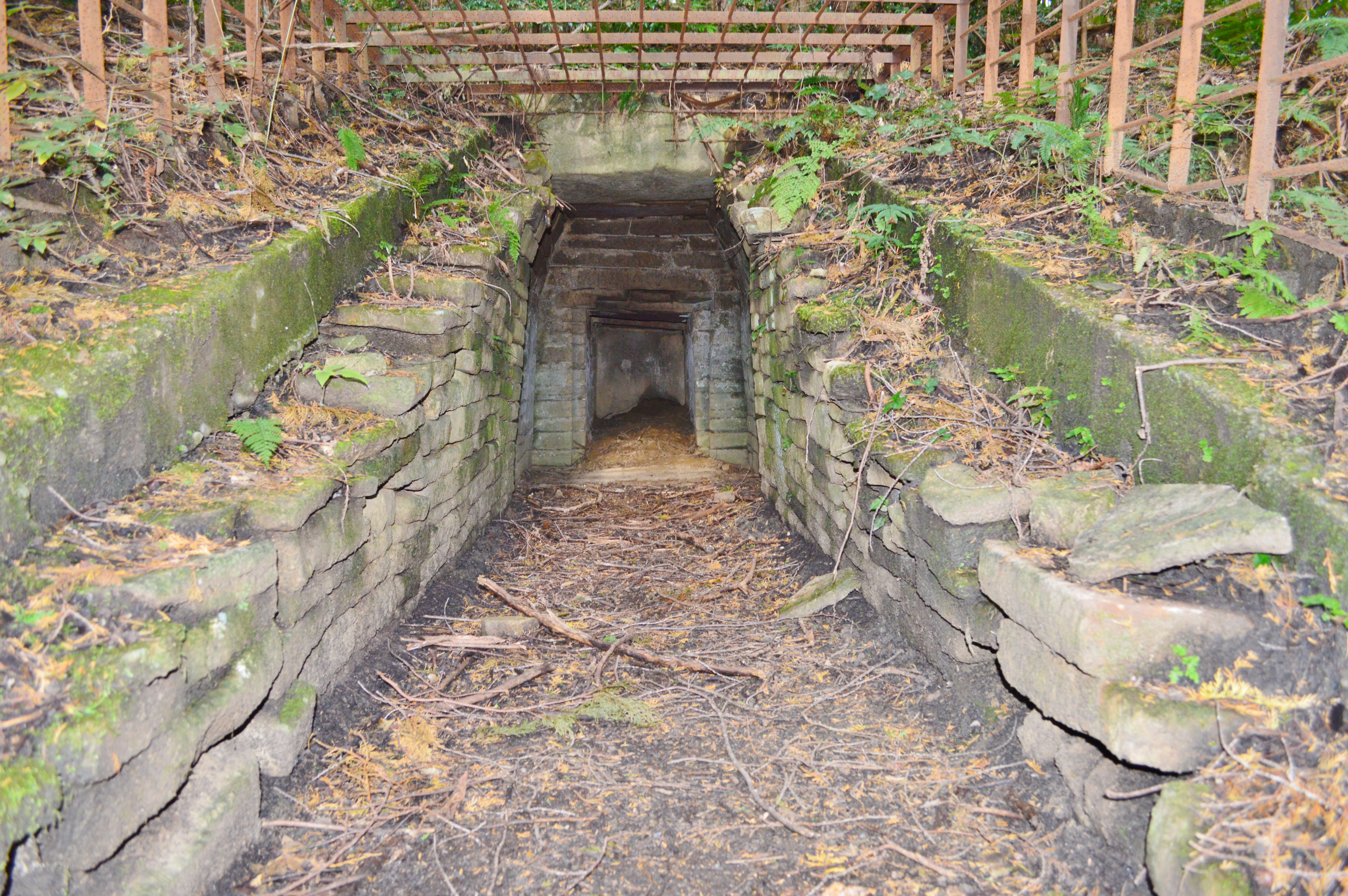
Passage

=== Hanayama Higashizuka Kofun ===
The Hanayama Higashiizuka Kofun (花山東塚古墳) is also circular tumulus and is located southeast of Hanayama Nishizuka Tomb. It has a diameter of 17 meters and height of 3.5 meters. As with the Hanayama Nishizuka Kofun, it has a brick-coffin-style horizontal stone burial chamber that opens to the south, but unlike the Hanayama Nishizuka Kofun, it does not have an inner chamber. It is estimated that it was built in the late 7th century, towards the end of the Kofun period. It is not included in the National Historic Site designation.

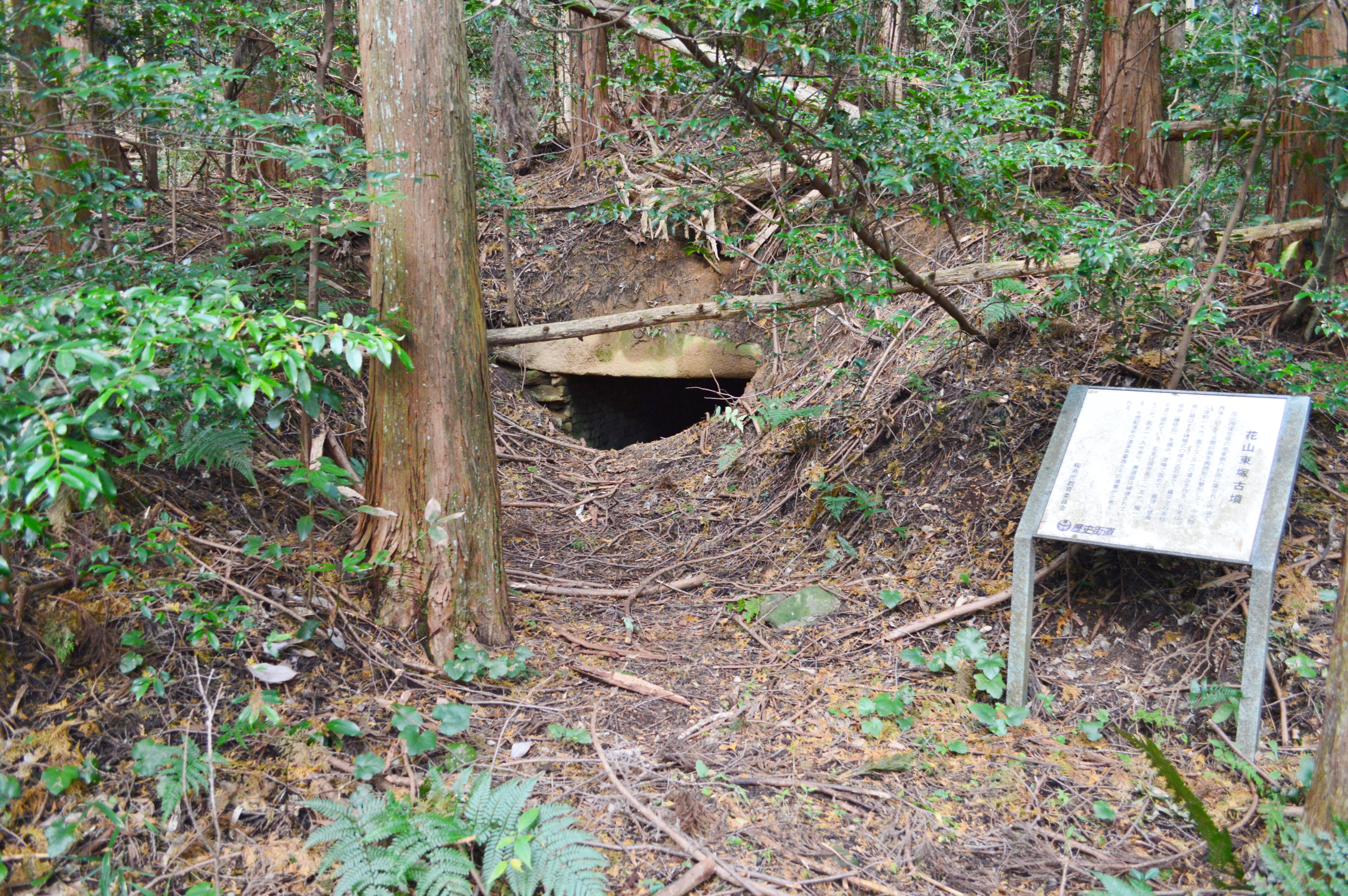
Entrance

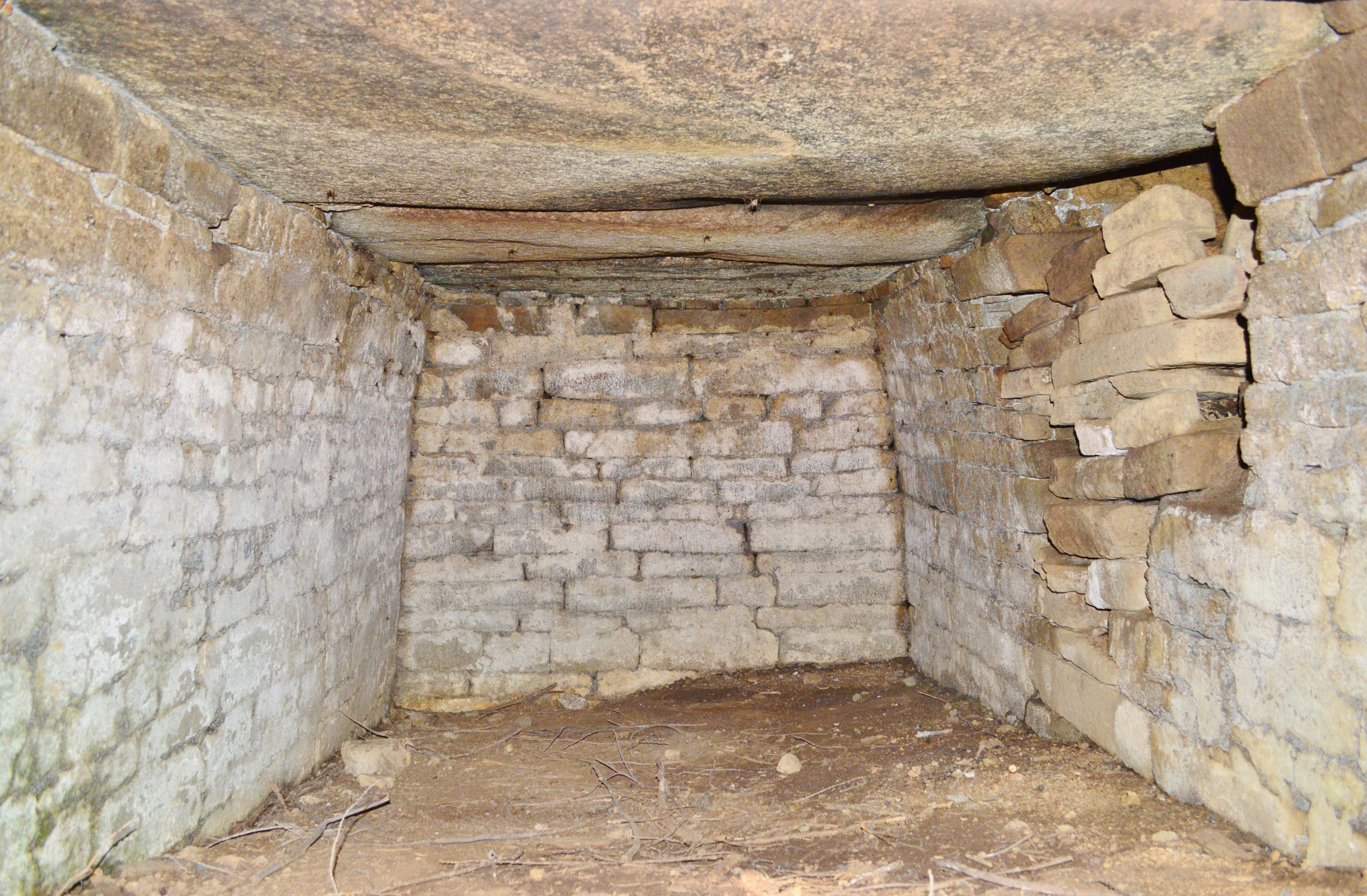
Burial Chamber

== See also ==
- List of Historic Sites of Japan (Nara)
