= Kusabaka Kofun =

Kofun period keyhole-shaped burial mound in Japan

- 艸墓古墳 (Japanese)
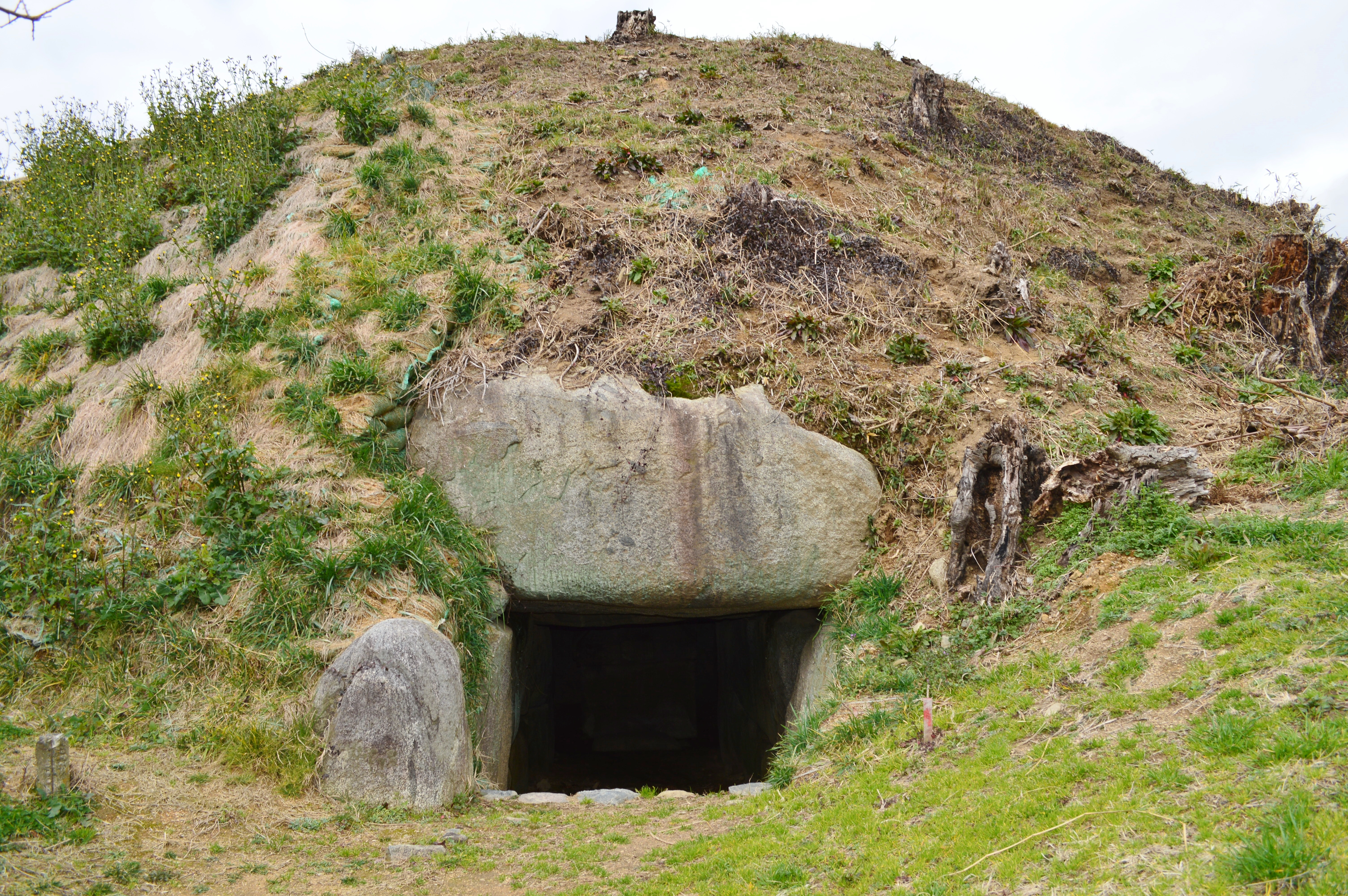
- Kusabaka Kofun

- Kusabaka Kofun Kusabaka Kofun (Japan)
- Interactive map of Kusabaka Kofun
- 34°30′11.55″N 135°50′44.45″E
- Type: Kofun
- Periods: Kofun period
- Location: Sakurai, Nara, Japan
- Region: Kansai region

History
- Built: c.7th century

Site notes
- Public access: Yes (no facilities)

Kusabaka Kofun (艸墓古墳) is a Kofun period burial mound, located in the Tani neighborhood of the city of Sakurai, Nara in the Kansai region of Japan. The tumulus was designated a National Historic Site of Japan in 1974. It is also called the "Kusahaka Kofun".

== Overview ==
The Kusabaka Kofun is a hōfun (方墳)-style rectangular tumulus located in the eastern edge of the Abe Hills on the left bank of the Terakawa River in the southern part of the Nara Basin. No archaeological excavation has been conducted to date.The shape of the tumulus is rectangular, with the northwest and southeast sides being slightly longer, measuring approximately 27 meters on the long side and 21 meters on the short side. The top of the mound is flat and shaped like a truncated cone. Fukiishi have been found on the outside of the mound, but no haniwa clay figures have been found. The mound is surrounded by a flat area, but there is no trace of a moat. The burial chamber is horizontal-entry style large stone chamber made of megaliths, with an opening to the southeast. The gaps between the stone walls were plastered, traces of which still remain today. Inside the chamber is a hollowed-out house-shaped stone sarcophagus made of stratified hyaloclastite, which had been brought to this site from the Kakogawa River basin in Hyogo Prefecture. The cover stone has a pair of rope-hanging protrusions on the front and back and two pairs on the left and right, and the inside is shallowly carved. As the sarcophagus is larger than the entry passageway, it had to have been placed in the burial chamber during the construction of the tumulus. The burial chamber has been open since antiquity, and the existence of any grave goods is unknown. The burial chamber has a total length of 13.16 meters, with the main chamber measuring 4.44 by 2.71 meters, with a 2.0 meter height.

Based on its style of construction, the tumulus is estimated to have been built in the mid-7th century, towards the end of the Kofun period. This tumulus is part of a cluster megalithic tombs in the Abe Hills. Remains of large buildings have also been found in the surrounding ruins, and connections to the ancient Abe clan have been speculated.

The tumulus is about 30 minutes on foot from Sakurai Station on the Kintetsu Railway Osaka Line.

It is about a 30-minute walk from Sakurai Station on the Kintetsu Railway Osaka Line and other lines.

== See also ==
- List of Historic Sites of Japan (Nara)
