= Ōbara-dera =

Buddhist temple in Sakurai, Nara, Japan

- 粟原寺
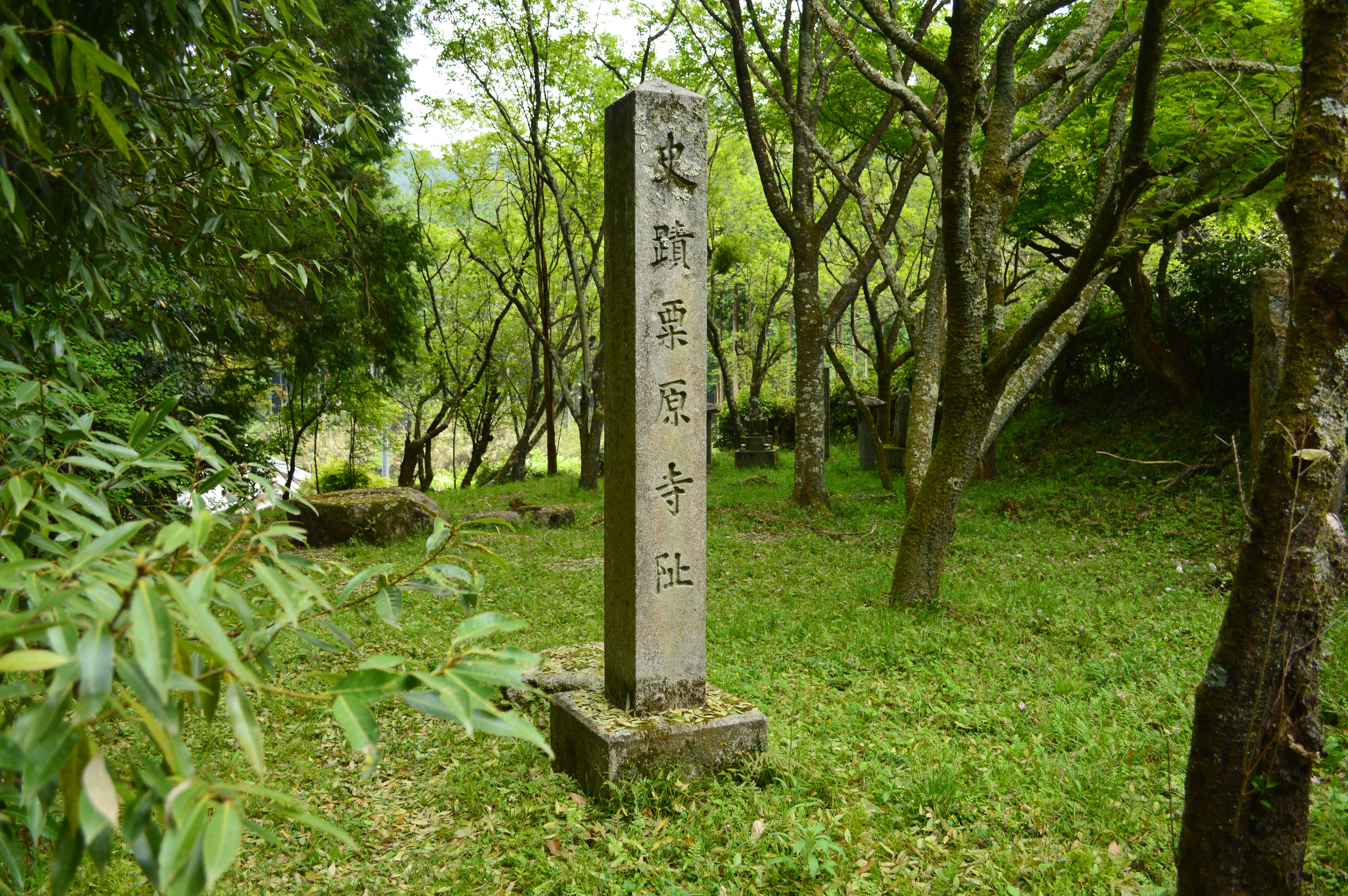
- Ōbara-dera ruins

- Location within Nara Prefecture Location within Japan

Religion
- Affiliation: Buddhist
- Status: ruins

Location
- Location: Sakurai, Nara
- Country: Japan
- Interactive map of Ōbara-dera
- Coordinates: 34°29′55″N 135°53′32″E

Architecture
- Completed: c.694
- National Historic Site

Ōbara-dera (粟原寺) was a Buddhist temple established during the Asuka period in the Ōbara neighborhood of the city of Sakurai, Nara Prefecture, Japan. The temple no longer exists, and its ruins have been protected as a designated a National Historic Site since1927.

== Overview ==
The Ōbara temple ruins are located on the northern foot of the Ryumon Mountains, on a slightly elevated spot behind a Tenman-gu shrine on the southern outskirts of Obara village. Since no archaeological excavation has been conducted, the details of the temple, such as the size and layout, remain unknown. However, the foundation of the temple is known from an inscription on the "Ōbara-dera Three-Storied Pagoda Fuchibachi" owned by Tanzan Shrine. (A fuchibachi is a part of the spire at the top of a pagoda). This fuchibachi was designated as a National Treasure as an important source of ancient epigraphy, and states that Nakatomi Ōshima, an aristocrat and poet of the Asuka period active in both domestic and foreign affairs during the reigns of Emperor Tenmu and Empress Jitō, secretly vowed to build a temple in memory Prince Kusakabe, but died before fulfilling his vow. After Nakatomi Ōshima's death, Princess Nukata started construction in 694, and built a Main Hall housing an 18-foot-tall (5.5 m) image of Shaka Nyōrai. The three-story pagoda was completed in 715. Princess Nukata was once Emperor Tenmu's wife, a Man'yōshū poet, and there is a theory that she was Nakatomi Ōshima's wife in her later years.

The remains consist of the six-meter-square foundations of the pagoda, with a circular granite core stone with a cylindrical hole in the center about 85 centimeters (33 in) in diameter and about 4 centimeters (1.6 in) deep with a small groove carved to the outside to allow moisture to escape. On the west side is an area thought to be the remains of the Main Hall, with several foundation stones remaining, and a thirteen-story stone pagoda from the late Kamakura period. However, the foundations stones may no be in their original locations. Among the roof tiles collected at the site was a round tile with a compound petal eight-petal lotus pattern and a flat tile with a biased arabesque pattern, which appear to be similar to those used in the original Yakushi-ji temple in Asuka.

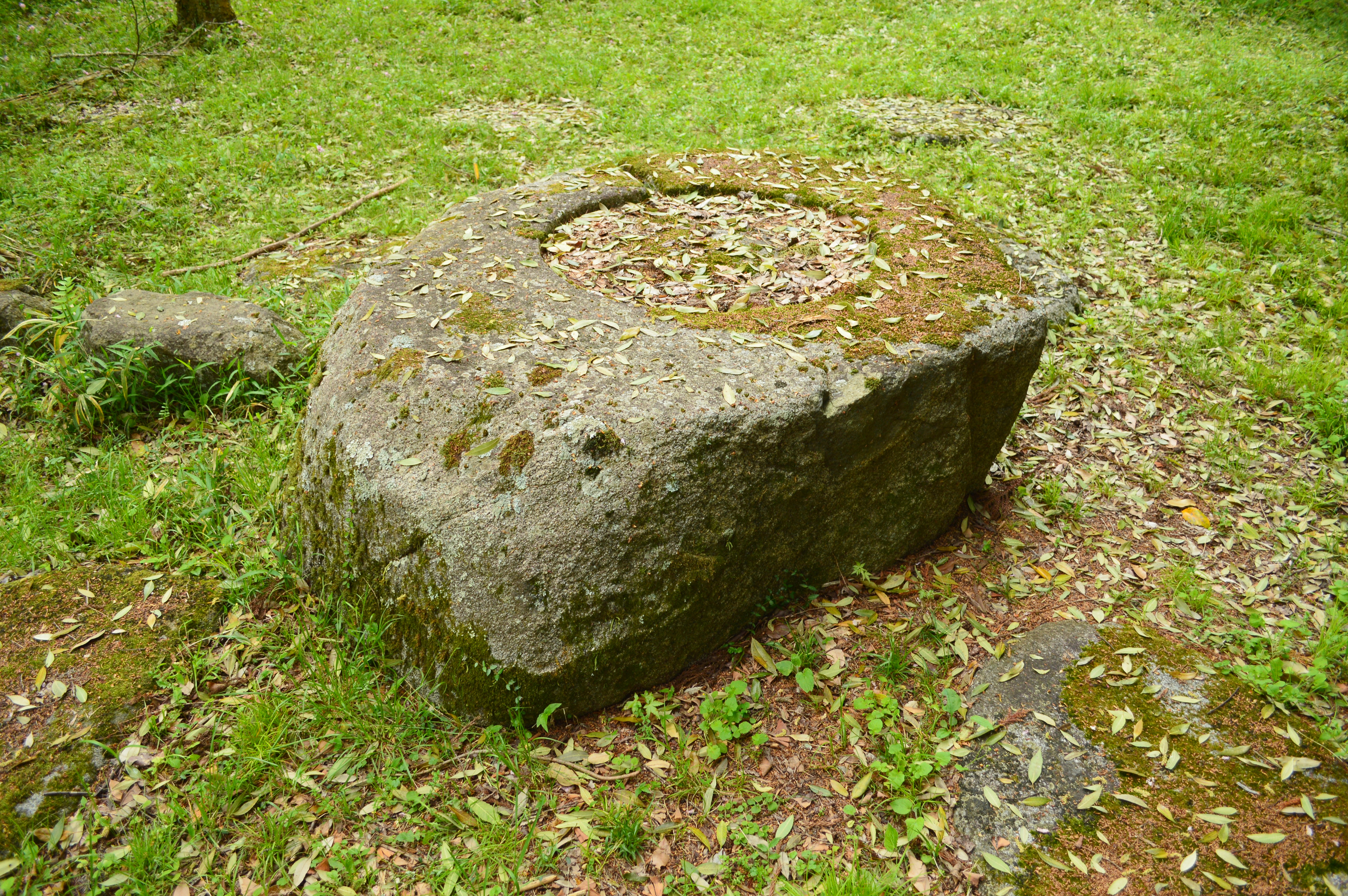
Foundation stone of the pagoda

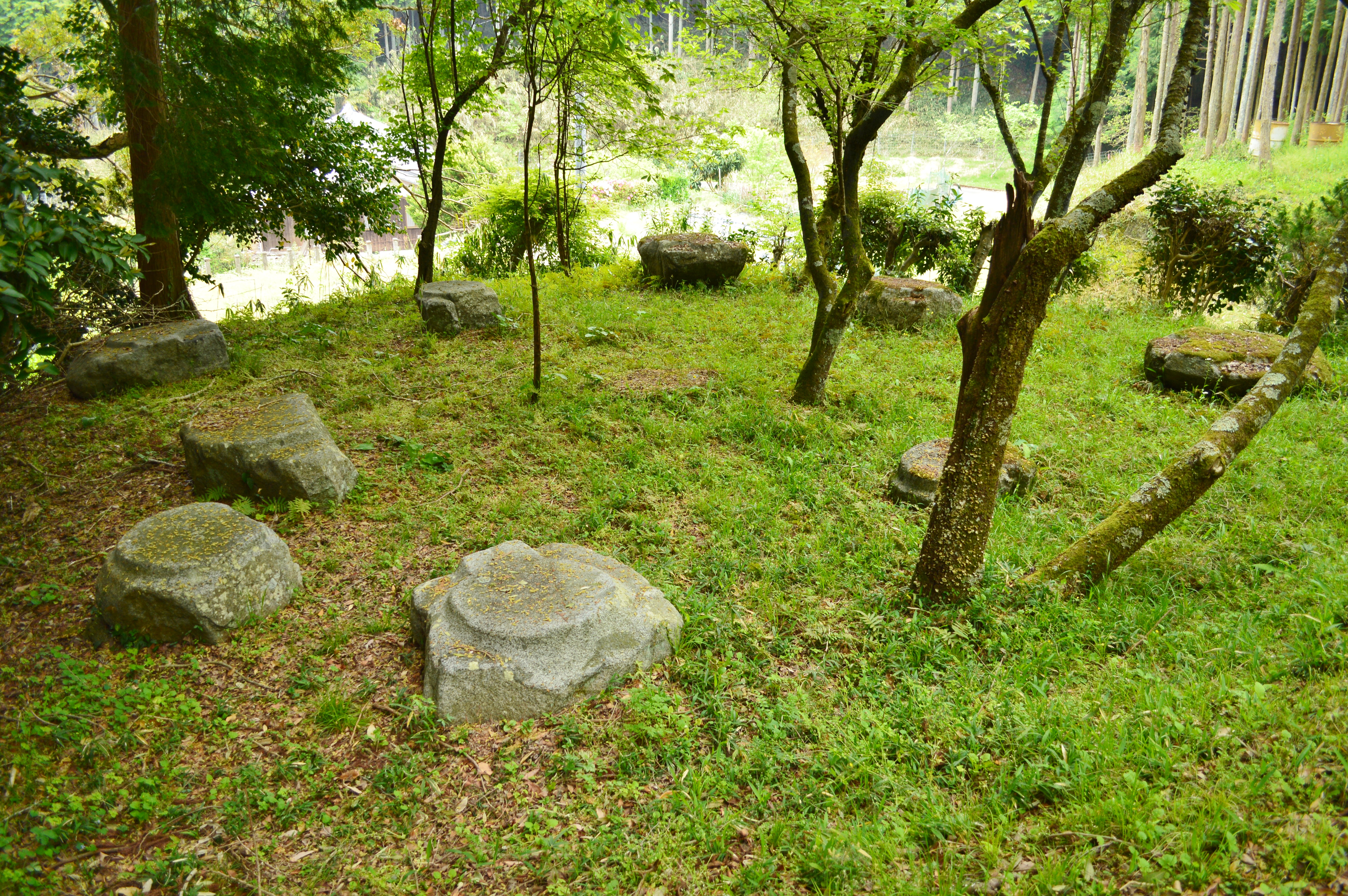
Foundation stones

== See also ==
- List of Historic Sites of Japan (Nara)
