= Chihara Ōbaka Kofun =

Kofun period keyhole-shaped burial mound in Japan

- 茅原大墓古墳 (Japanese)
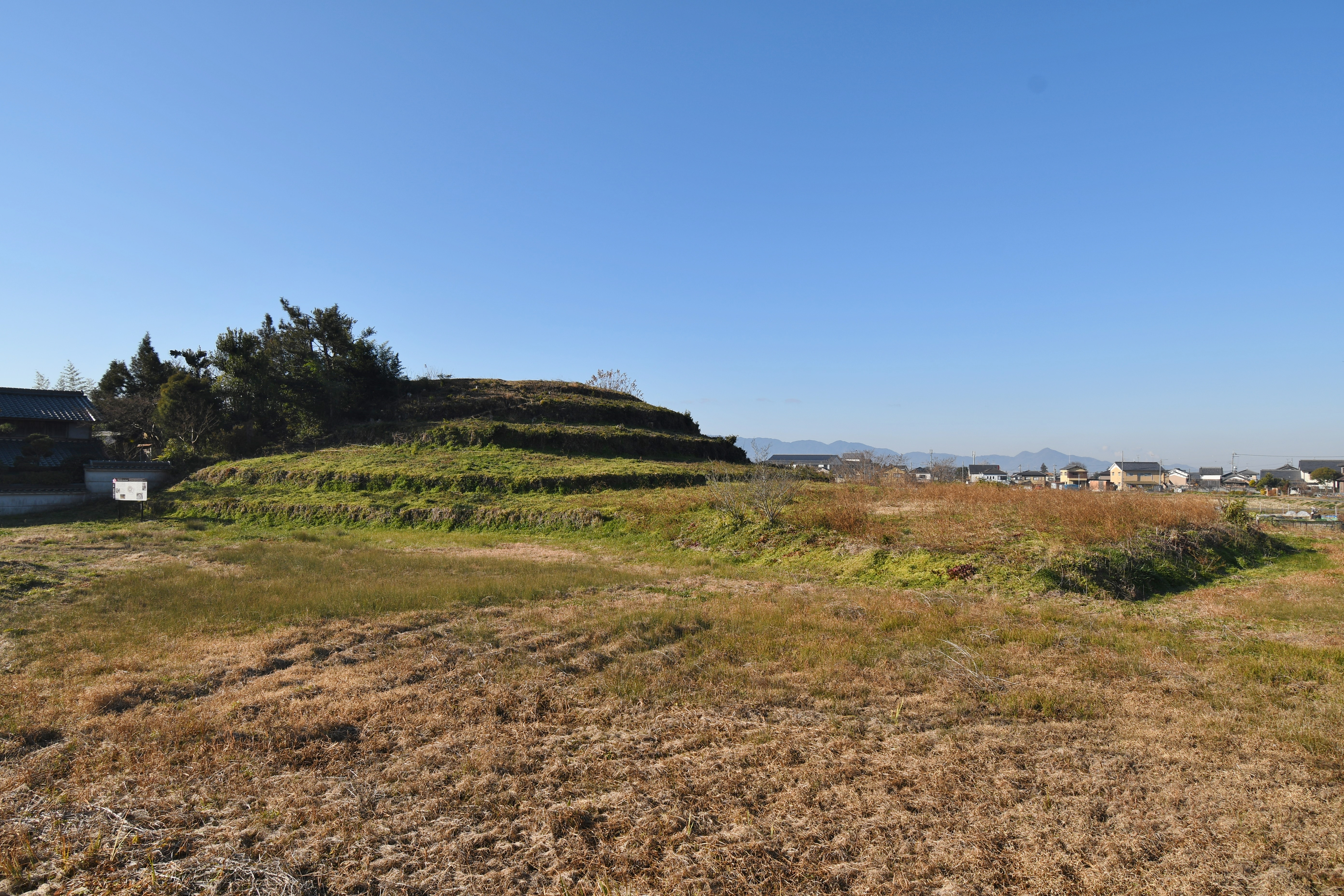
- Chihara Ōbaka Kofun

- Chihara Ōbaka Kofun Chihara Ōbaka Kofun (Japan)
- 34°32′12.23″N 135°50′50″E
- Type: Kofun
- Periods: Kofun period
- Location: Sakurai, Nara, Japan
- Region: Kansai region

History
- Built: c.4th century

Site notes
- Public access: Yes (no facilities)
- National Historic Site of Japan

Chihara Ōbaka Kofun (茅原大墓古墳) is an early Kofun period burial mound, located in the Chihara neighborhood of the city of Sakurai, Nara in the Kansai region of Japan. The tumulus was designated a National Historic Site of Japan in 1982.

== Overview ==
Chihara Ōbaka Kofun is located in the southeastern part of the Nara Basin, at the western foot of Mount Miwa. The area contains the Yamato Tomb Group, including the Hashihaka Kofun, dating from early Kofun period, (3rd to the latter half of the 4th century); however, this kofun is from the middle of the Kofun period, no other major tombs from around the time of the construction of this tumulus are in the immediate vicinity. It was excavated in 1978. The tumulus is a scallop-shaped kofun (帆立型古墳) orientated to the north. It as a length of 67 meters, with a posterior circular portion 56 meters in diameter and eight meters tall. The anterior portion has a maximum width of 29 meters, and is two meters tall. There is a reservoir pond on the west side of the tumulus, which is thought to be the surviving remains of a moat. The posterior mound is constructed in five tiers, with fukiishi and cylindrical and house-shaped haniwa on the surface. In 2011, a haniwa from the late 4th century depicting a human head on a shield was found in the moat, and is the oldest anthropomorphic haniwa yet discovered. The burial facility is unclear, and details about the grave goods are also unknown.

The tumulus is about a 20-minute walk from Miwa Station on the JR West Sakurai Line.

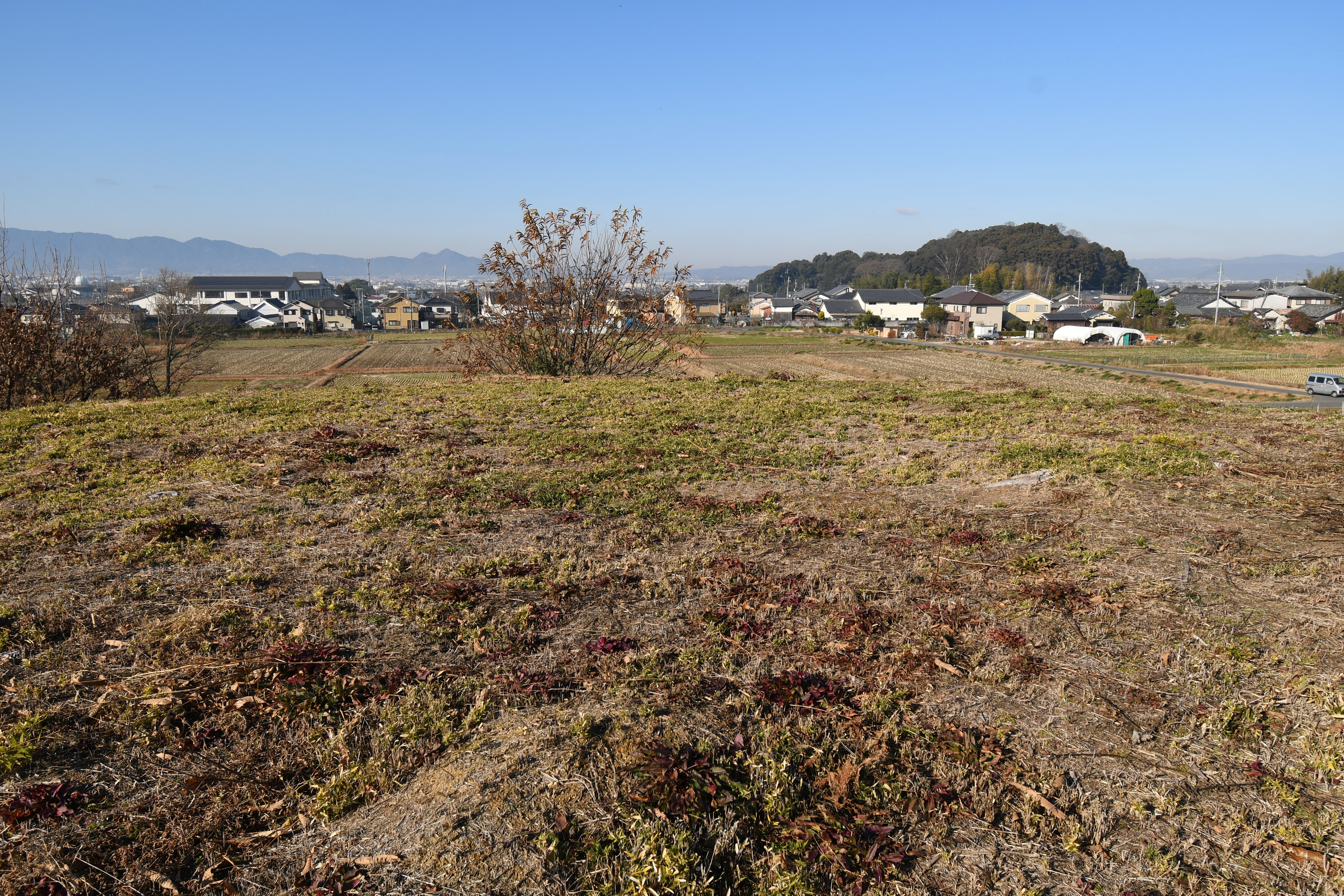
Top of the mound at the rear of the mound

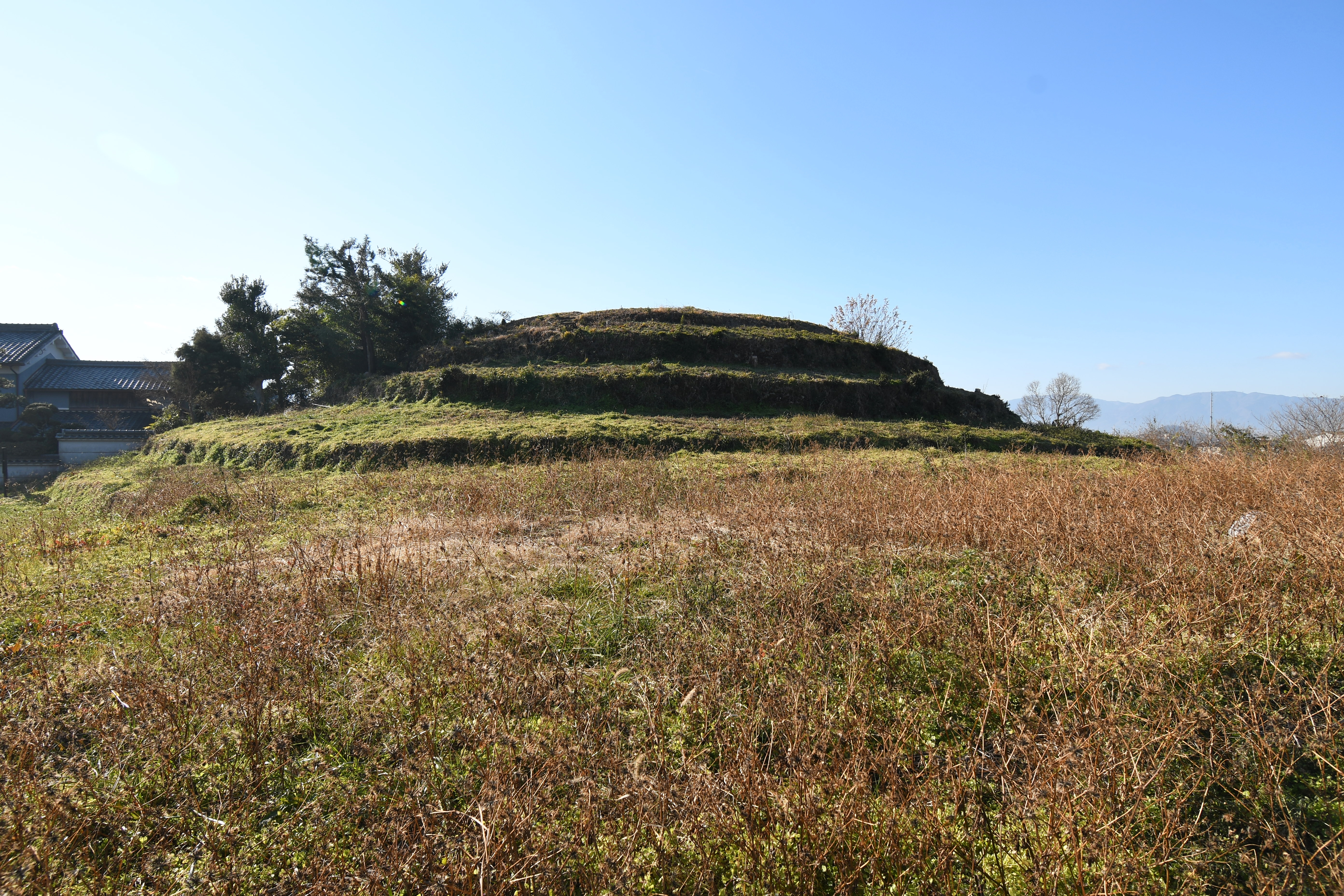
View of the mound at the rear from the front

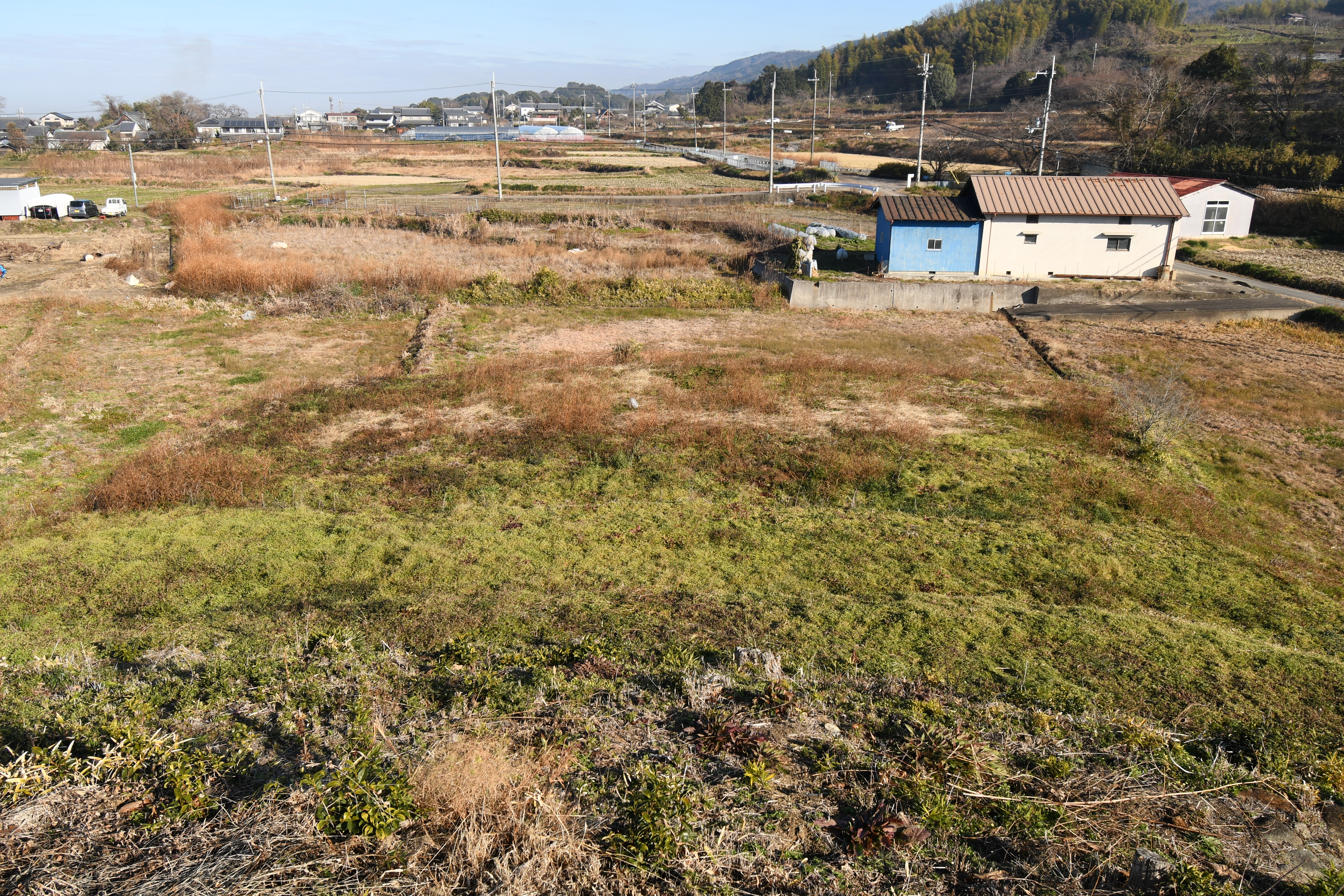
View of the front from the rear

== See also ==
- List of Historic Sites of Japan (Nara)
