= Abe Monju-in =

- 安倍文殊院, あべもんじゅいん
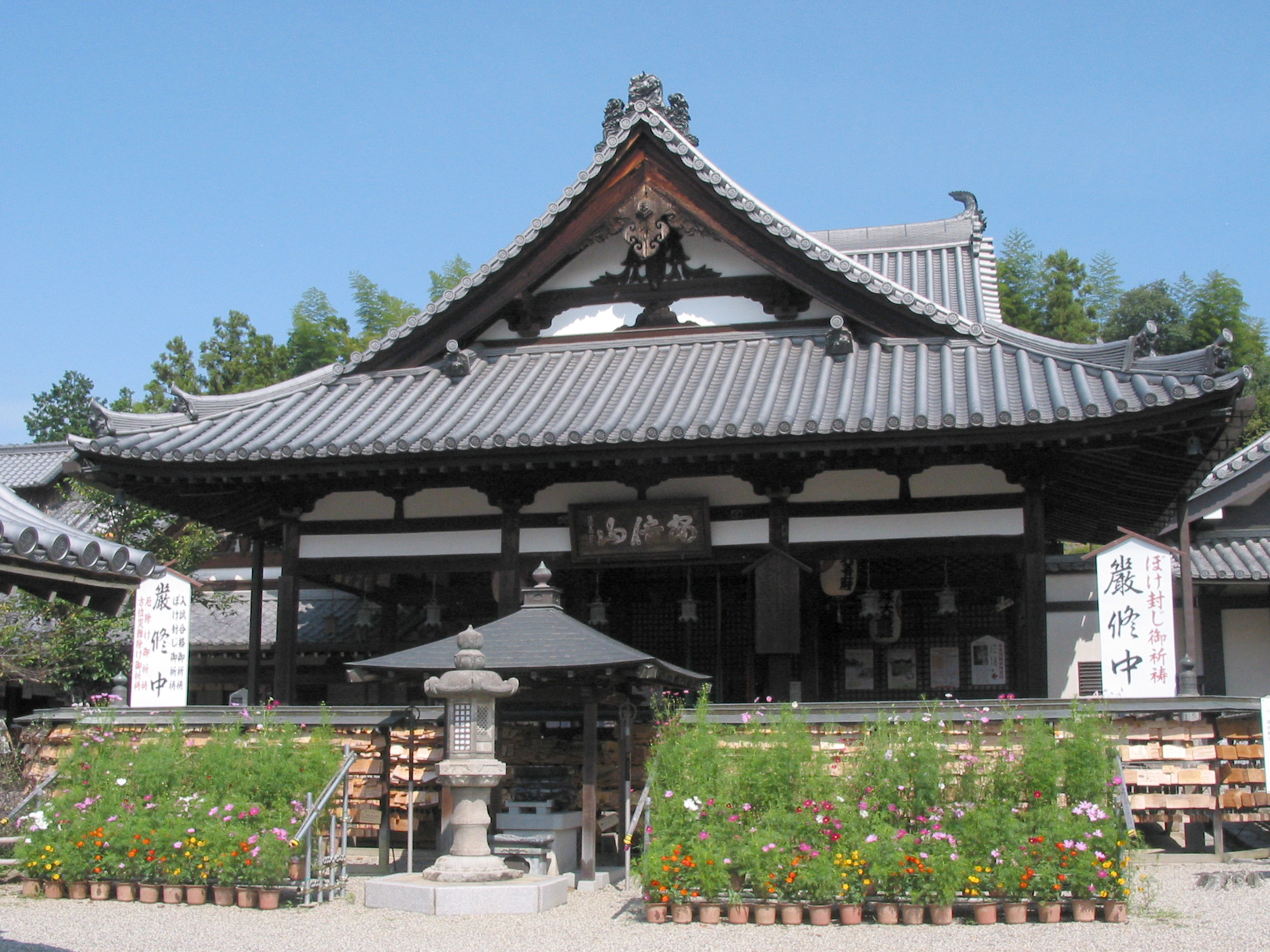
- Abe Monju-in Hondō (built 1665)

- Location within Japan

Religion
- Affiliation: Buddhist
- Prefecture: Nara

Location
- Municipality: Sakurai
- Country: Japan
- Interactive map of Abe Monju-in
- Prefecture: Nara
- Coordinates: 34°30′13.55″N 135°50′33.21″E

Abe Monju-in (安倍文殊院, あべもんじゅいん) is a Buddhist temple in the Abe area of Sakurai, Nara Prefecture, Japan. Dating to the seventh century, it houses a sculptural group by Kaikei, and a kofun within its grounds has been designated a Special Historic Site.

== History ==
Founded as Sūke-ji in the seventh century, in 834 the monk Shinga saw a vision of a golden image of Manjusri (Monju) emerging from a cave within the temple compound. Subsequently, he dedicated a hall, the Monju-dō. The cult grew in popularity in the late Heian period and Ninshō attended the temple regularly.

== Buildings ==
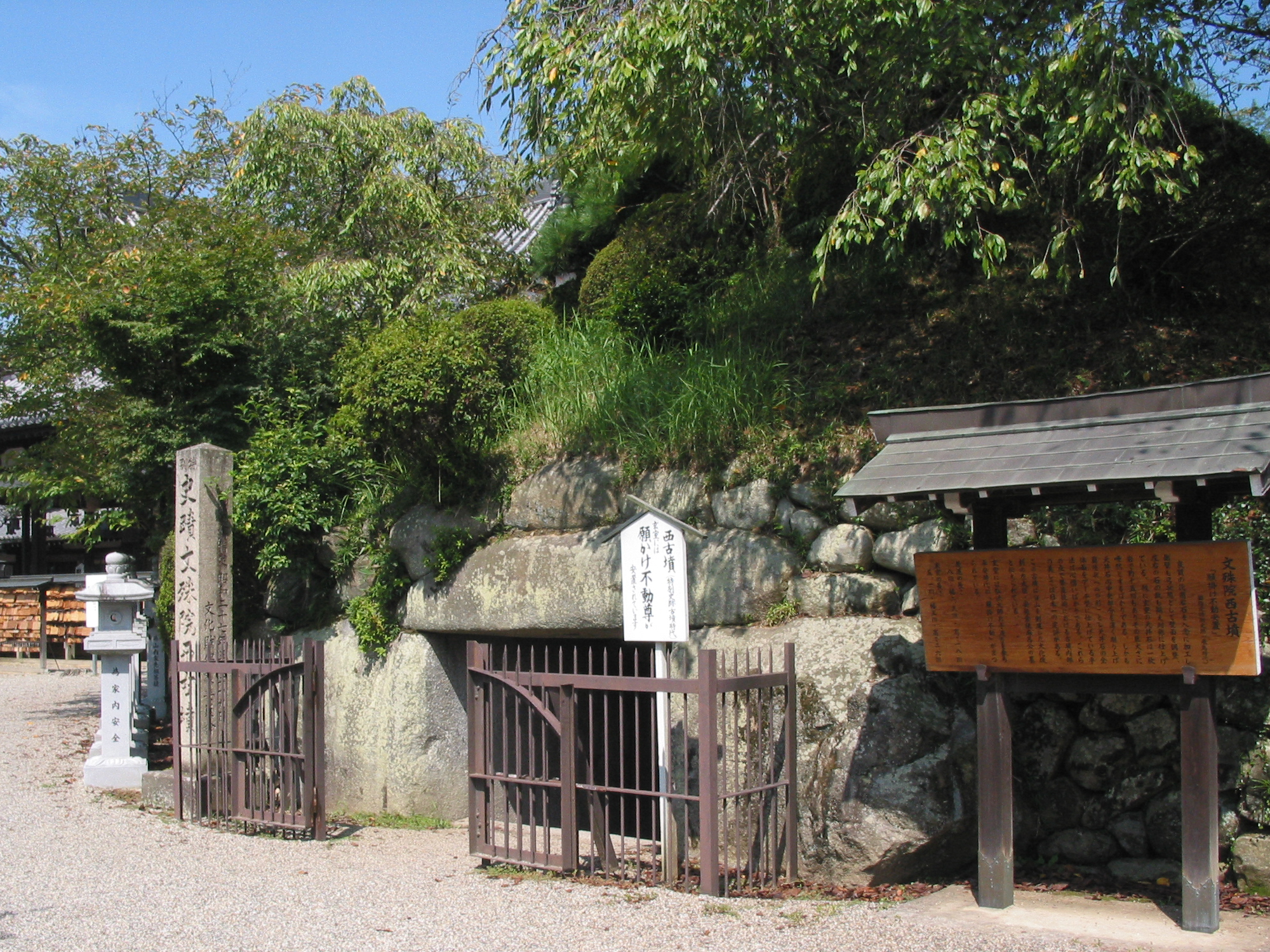
Monju-in Nishi Kofun

The Hondō, rebuilt several times due to fires, dates to 1665. The single bay nagare-zukuri, shake-roofed Hakusan Jinja Honden (Sengoku period) is an Important Cultural Property. The temple has been renovated in recent years.

== Monju pentad ==
There is a large statue group with a seven-metre high Manjusri (Monju) seated on a lion flanked by four attendants: a young boy, an aged layman, a monk, and a groom, one of a number of such groups dating to the thirteenth and fourteenth centuries. When the statues were dismantled for repairs in the 1930s, the signature of Kaikei, the year 1203, and the names of around fifty donors including both Kaikei and Shunjōbō Chōgen were found inscribed within Manjusri's head.

== Kofun ==
The square-chambered Monju-in Nishi Kofun is located within the grounds of the temple. In 1952 the tomb was designated a Special Historic Site.

== See also ==
- Kofun
- Shinbutsu shūgō
- List of Special Places of Scenic Beauty, Special Historic Sites and Special Natural Monuments
- Thirteen Buddhist Sites of Yamato
- List of National Treasures of Japan (sculptures)
