= Makimuku Station =

Railway station in Sakurai, Nara Prefecture, Japan

Makimuku Station 巻向駅
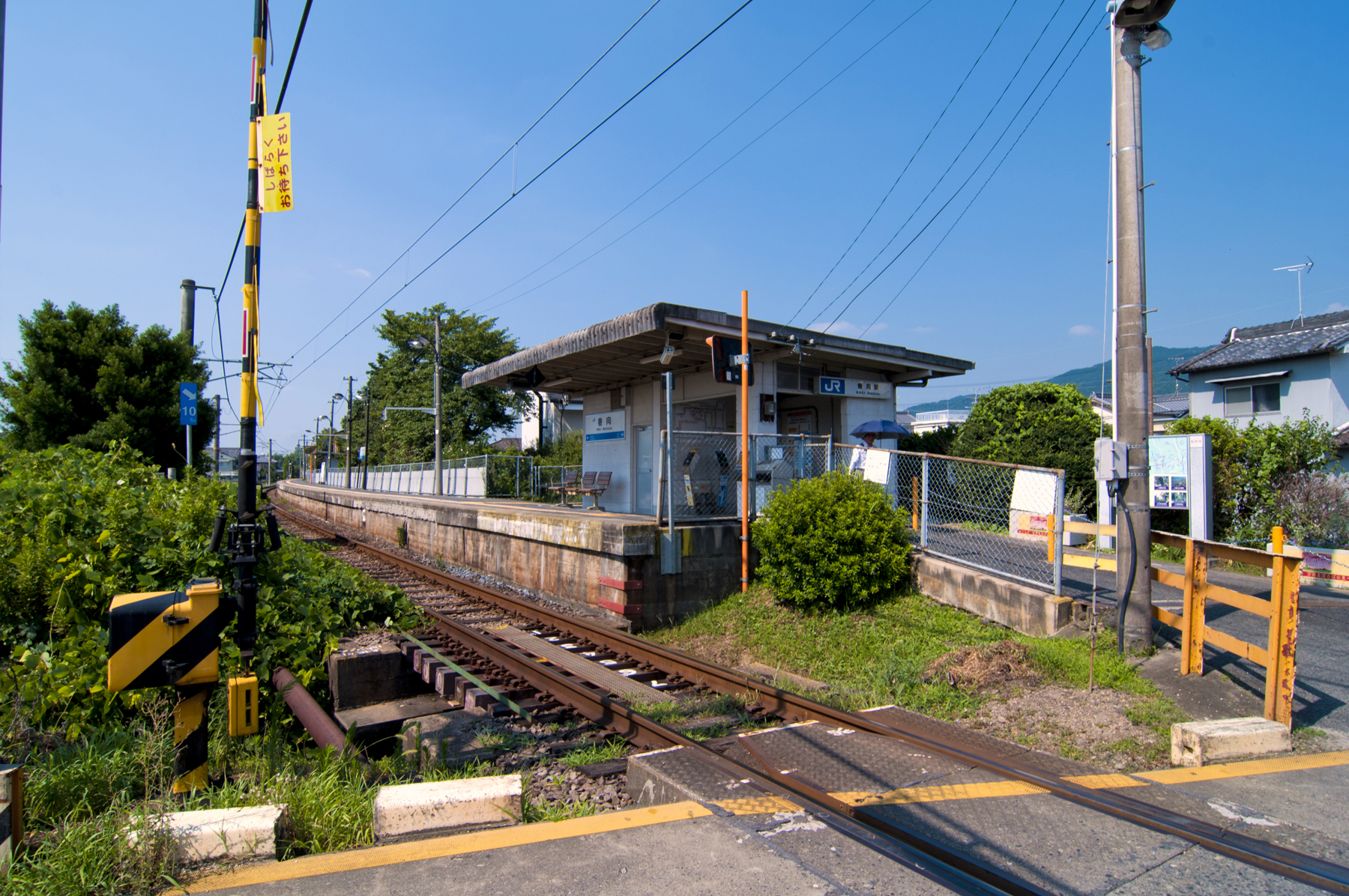
- Makimuku Station

General information
- Location: 36, Ōaza Tsuji, Sakurai-shi, Nara-ken 633-0083; Japan
- Coordinates: 34°32′42″N 135°50′28″E
- System: JR-West commuter rail station
- Owner: West Japan Railway Company (JR-West)
- Operator: Unstaffed
- Lines: Passenger train services: U Man-yō Mahoroba Line; Railway track: Sakurai Line
- Distance: 15.9 km (9.9 miles) from Nara
- Platforms: 1 side platform
- Tracks: 1
- Train operators: JR-West
- Connections: Nara Kotsu Bus Lines: 60, 61, 62, and 63 at Makinouchi

Construction
- Structure type: At grade
- Parking: None
- Cycle facilities: Available
- Accessible: None

Other information
- Website: http://www.jr-odekake.net/eki/top.php?id=0621707

History
- Opened: 1 August 1955

Passengers
- 2020: 353 daily
Services
Preceding station	JRW	Following station
U Man-yō Mahoroba Line
Yanagimoto toward Nara	Local	Miwa toward Wakayama, Ōji, Takada, and Sakurai
Yanagimoto; One-way	Rapid Service	Miwa toward JR Namba
Location
- Location within Nara Prefecture Location within Japan

Makimuku Station (巻向駅, Makimuku-eki) is a passenger railway station located in the city of Sakurai, Nara, Japan. It is operated by West Japan Railway Company (JR West) and is administrated by Ōji Station.

== Lines ==
Although the station is on the Sakurai Line as rail infrastructure, it has been served by the Man-yō Mahoroba Line since 2010 in terms of passenger train services. It is 15.9 kilometres from the starting point of the line at Nara.

== Layout ==
Makimuku Station is an above-ground station with one side platform serving a single track. The platform on the left side of the station facing towards Sakurai. The station is unattended.

== History ==
Makimuku station opened on 1 August 1955. With the privatization of the Japan National Railways (JNR) on April 1, 1987, the station came under the control of West Japan Railway Company (JR West).

== Passenger statistics ==
The average daily passenger traffic in fiscal 2020 was 353 passengers.

== Surrounding area ==
- Makimuku ruins
- Hashihaka Kofun

== See also ==
- List of railway stations in Japan
