= Maebashi Tenjinyama Kofun =

Kofun period burial mound in Gunma, Japan

- 前橋天神山古墳 (Japanese)
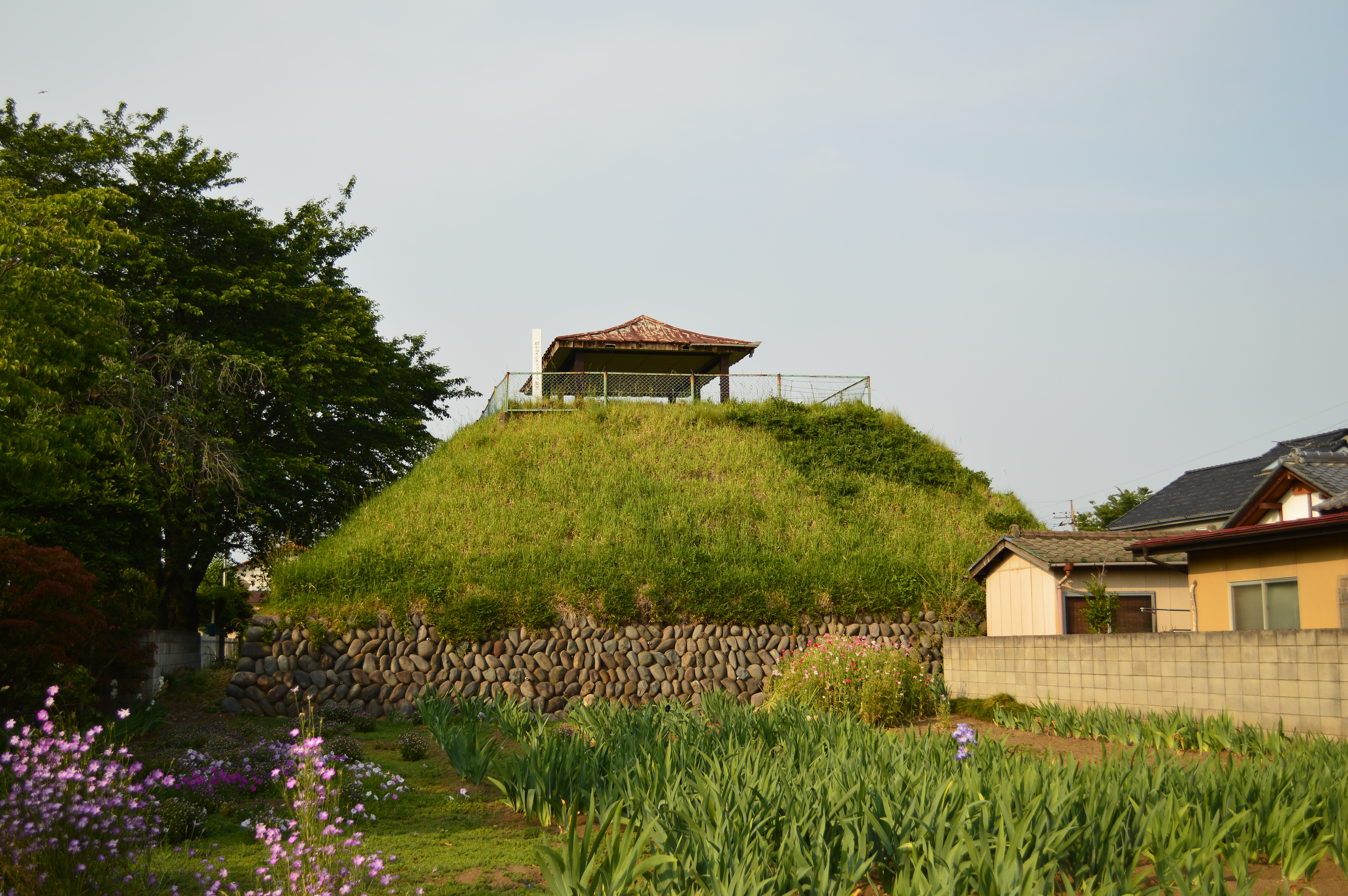
- Maebashi Tenjinyama Kofun

- Maebashi Tenjinyama Kofunn Maebashi Tenjinyama Kofun (Japan)
- 36°21′53.7″N 139°6′14.2″E
- Type: Kofun
- Periods: Kofun period
- Location: 1-27-7 Hirose-cho, Maebashi, Gunma
- Region: Kantō region

History
- Built: 4th century

Site notes
- Public access: Yes (park)
- National Important Cultural Property Gunma Prefecture Historic Site

The Maebashi Tenjinyama Kofun (前橋天神山古墳) was a Kofun period burial mound, located in the Hirose-cho neighborhood of the city of Maebashi, Gunma in the Kantō region of Japan. The tumulus was designated a Gunma Prefecture Historic Site in 1970, and the artifacts recovered from the site are collectively designated as a National Important Cultural Property.

== Overview ==
The Maebashi Tenjinyama Kofun was a zenpō-kōen-fun (前方後円墳), which is shaped like a keyhole, having one square end and one circular end, when viewed from above. It was located on the Maebashi Plateau.The mound was constructed in three tiers and has a surrounding moat. The flat surfaces of the middle and lower tiers of the mound were covered with fukiishi revetment stones, and the sloping tiers were covered with stones in a straight line. At the top of the mound, red-painted, perforated jars were arranged like cylindrical haniwa.

In the summer of 1968, the tumulus, which was located on private land, was scheduled for leveling due to urban expansion. A rescue archaeology excavation was performed, by which time the anterior rectangular portion of the mound had already been leveled, and the posterior circular section was also scheduled to be leveled after the excavation. However, no burial facilities were confirmed during this investigation. After the excavation closed without any definitive discoveries, a high school student who had participated in the investigation continued to visit the burial mound afterwards, and discovered a clay burial chamber in an area of the circular portion of the mound which archaeologists had overlooked in their haste. This caused the construction work to be halted, and afterwards what remained on the tumulus was granted protection as a prefectural historic site. Based on the unearthed earthenware and other artifacts, it is believed that the tumulus was constructed during the early Kofun period, around the 4th century.

The clay burial chamber was 7.8 by 1.4 meters and was located in the center of the circular mound. It contained a large number of grave goods:

- 5 bronze mirrors
  - 1 triangular-rimmed mirror with four gods and four beasts
  - 1 triangular-rimmed mirror with five gods and four beasts
  - 1 three-tiered mirror depicting immortals
  - 1 mirror depicting two birds and two beasts
  - 1 deformed animal-shaped mirror
- 30 bronze arrowheads
- 74 iron arrowheads
- 1 large sword with plain ring pommel
- 6 iron swords
- 12 iron daggers
- 1 knife
- 23 chisels
- 3 iron axes
- 6 fishhook-shaped fittings
- 6 needles
- 2 quivers
- 4 jasper spindle whorls
- 1 earthenware pot (with red pigment)

Other bronze mirrors cast using the same mold as the triangular-rimmed mirror with five gods and four beasts are found in the Sakurai Chausuyama Kofun in Sakurai, Nara, and the Kurozuka Kofun in Tenri, Nara. The contents of these burial The artifacts from this site are currently housed in the Tokyo National Museum.

The tumulus is approximately 800 meters southwest of the JR East Ryōmō Line Maebashi-Ōshima Station.

Total length
129 meters:
Anterior rectangular portion
68 meters wide x 7 meters high, 3-tiers
Posterior circular portion
75 meter diameter x 9 meters high, 3-tiers

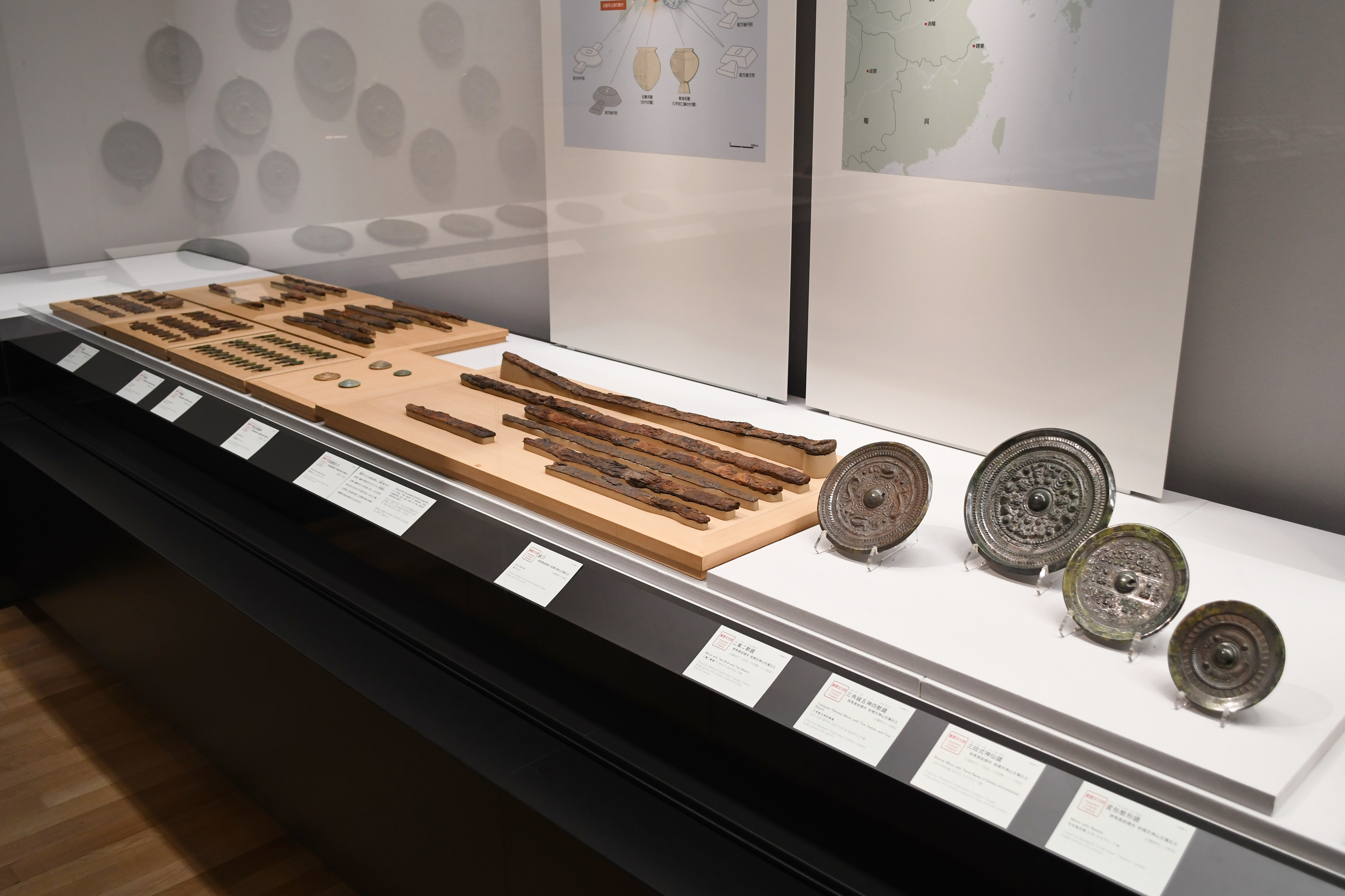
Artifacts now at Tokyo National Museum

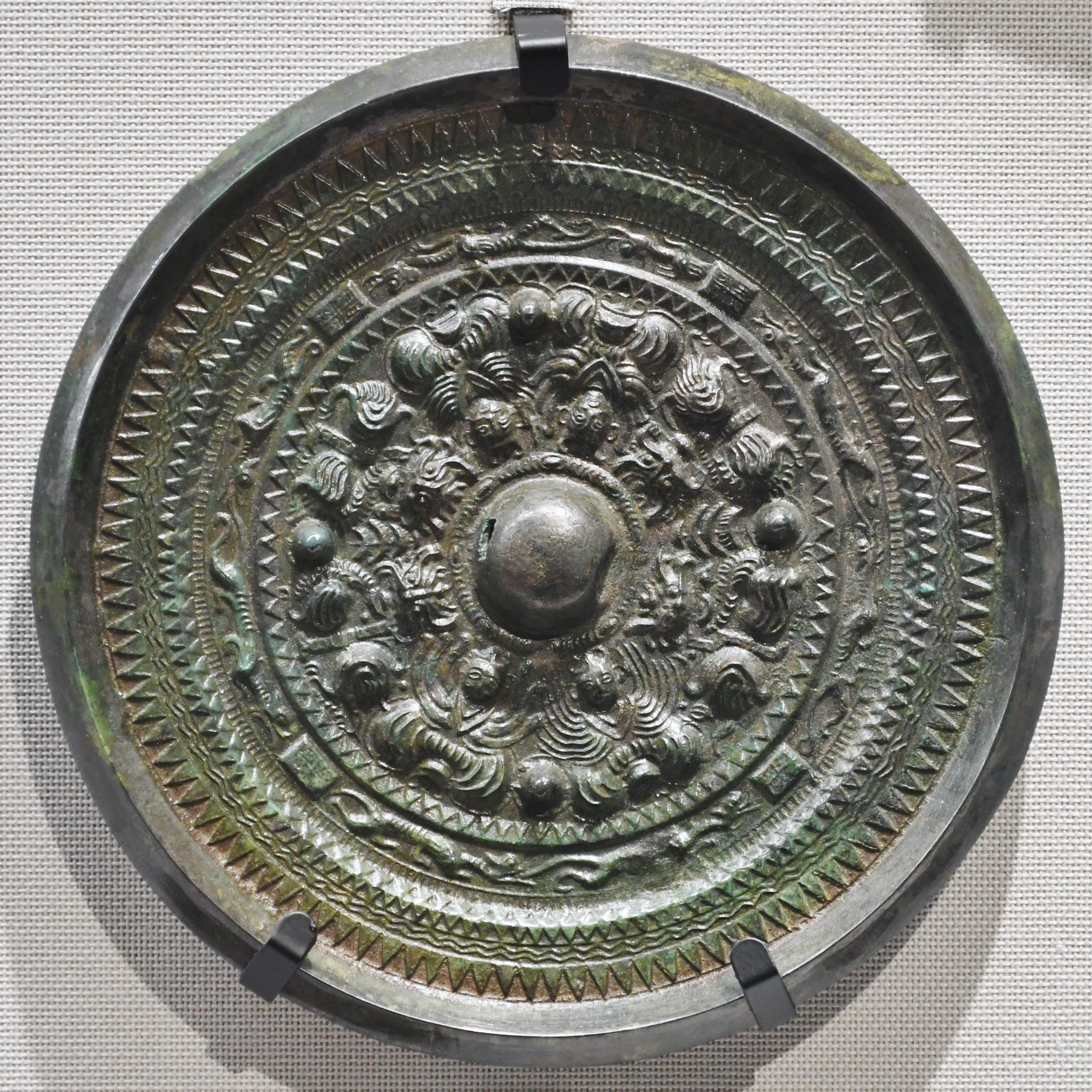
Triangular-rimmed mirror with four gods and four beasts

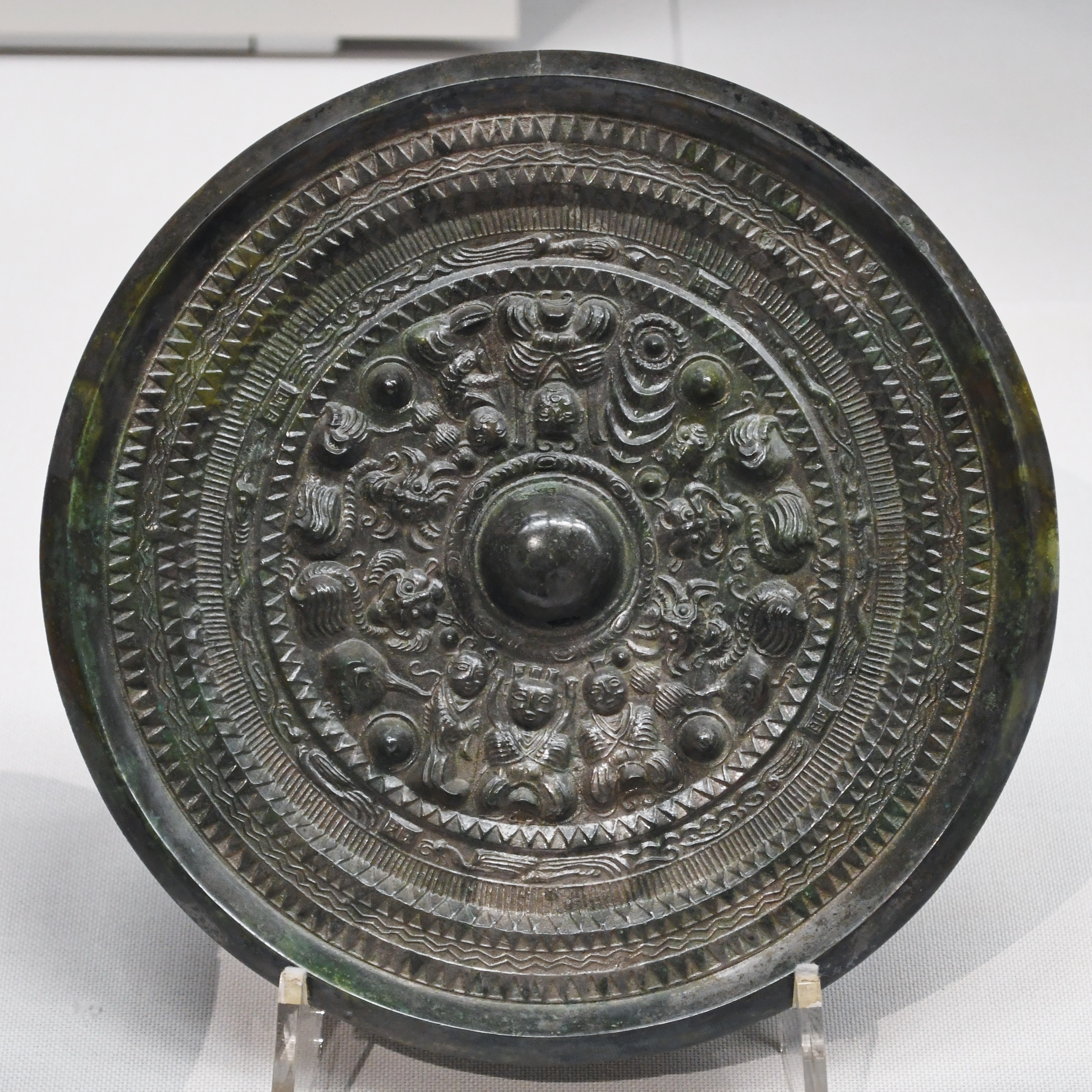
Triangular-rimmed mirror with five gods and four beasts

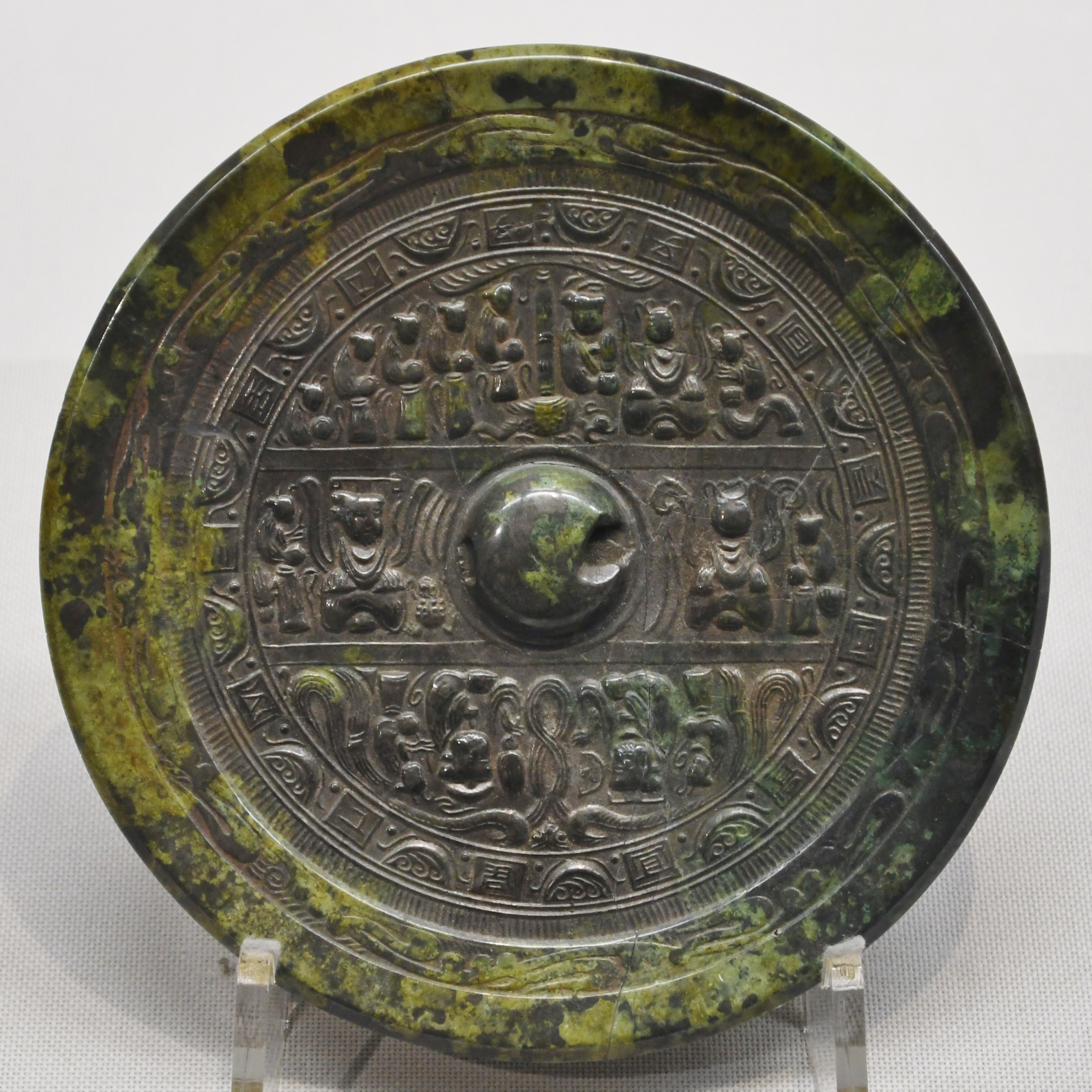
Three-tiered mirror with divine immortals

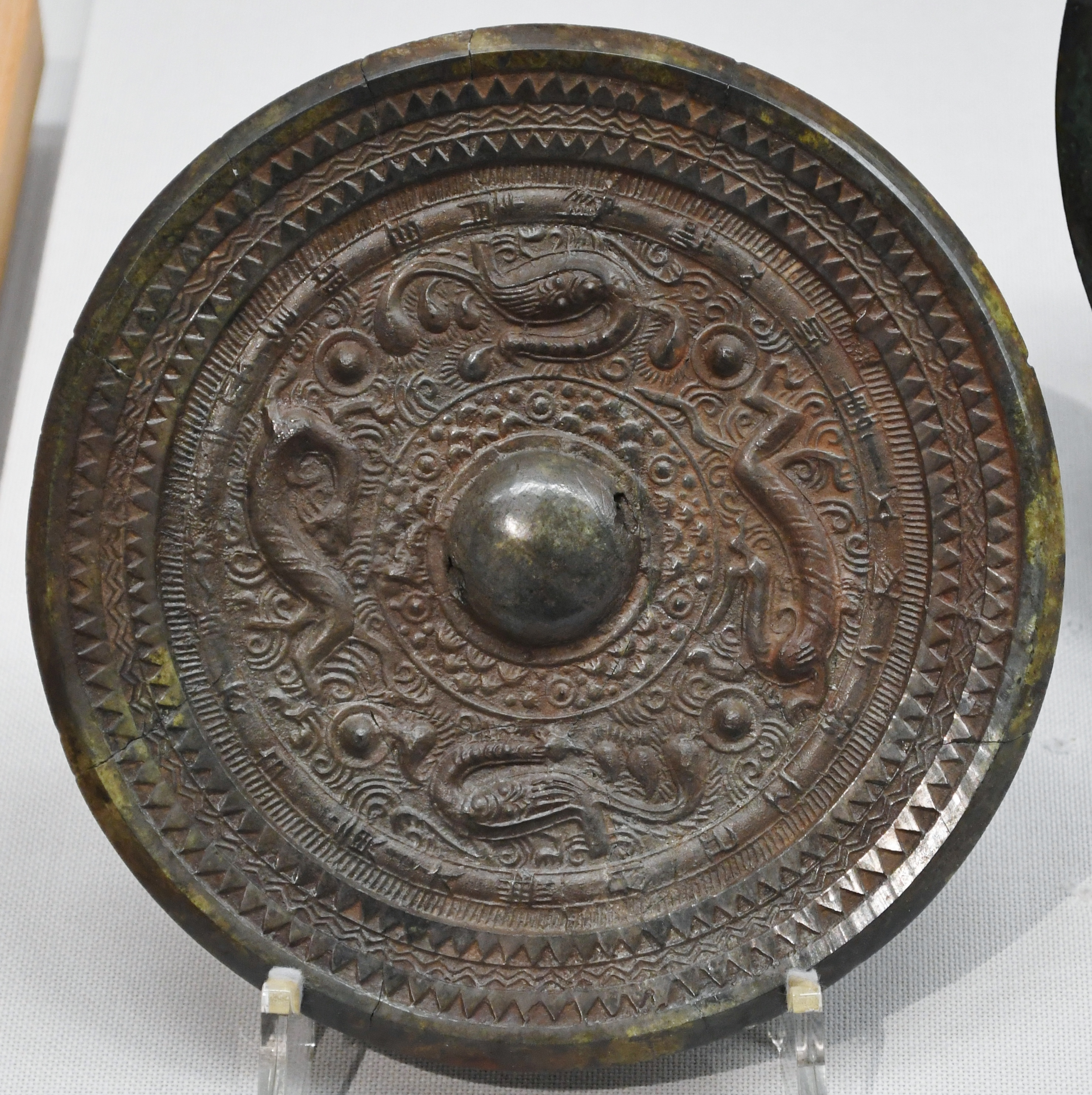
Mirror with two birds and two beasts

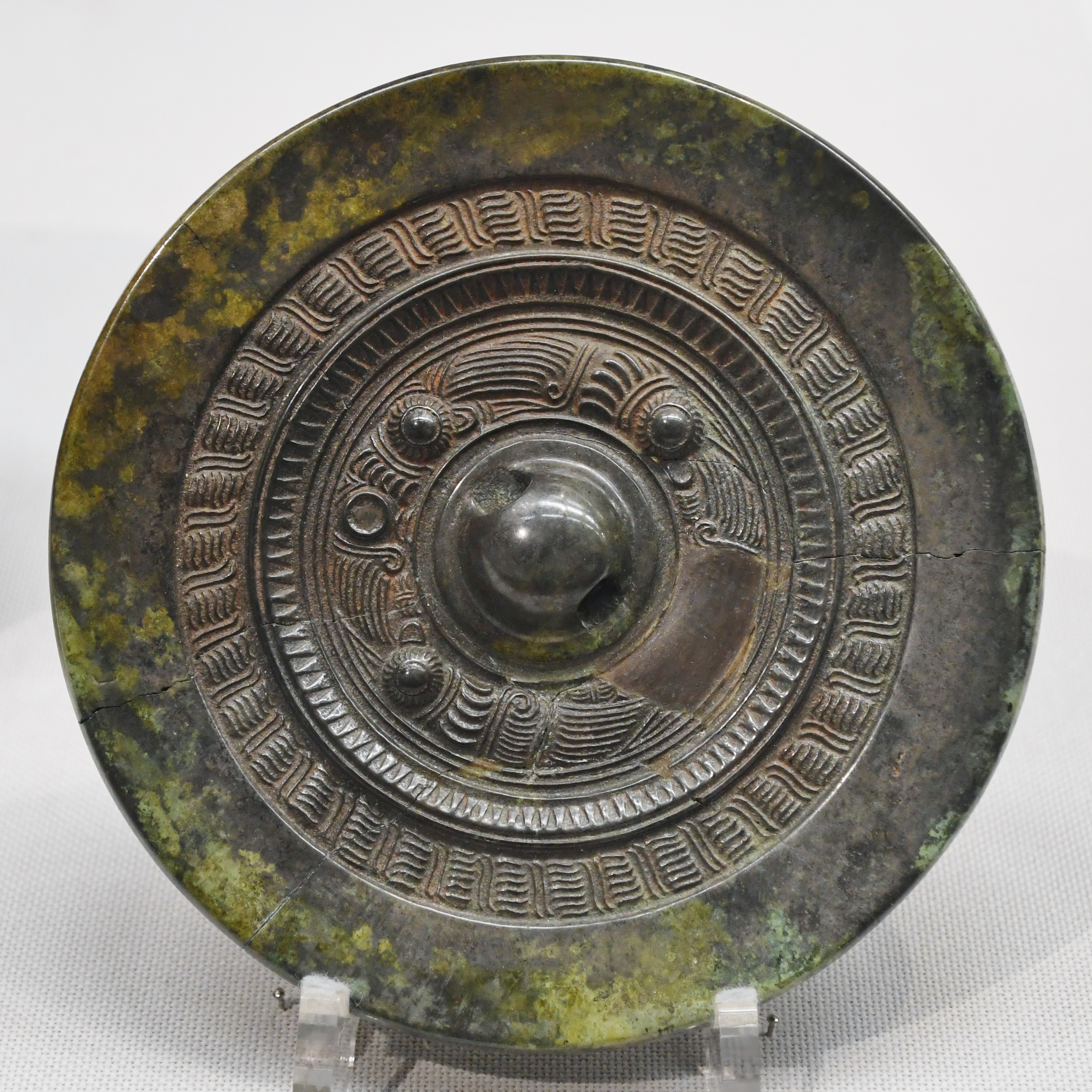
Deformed animal-shaped mirror

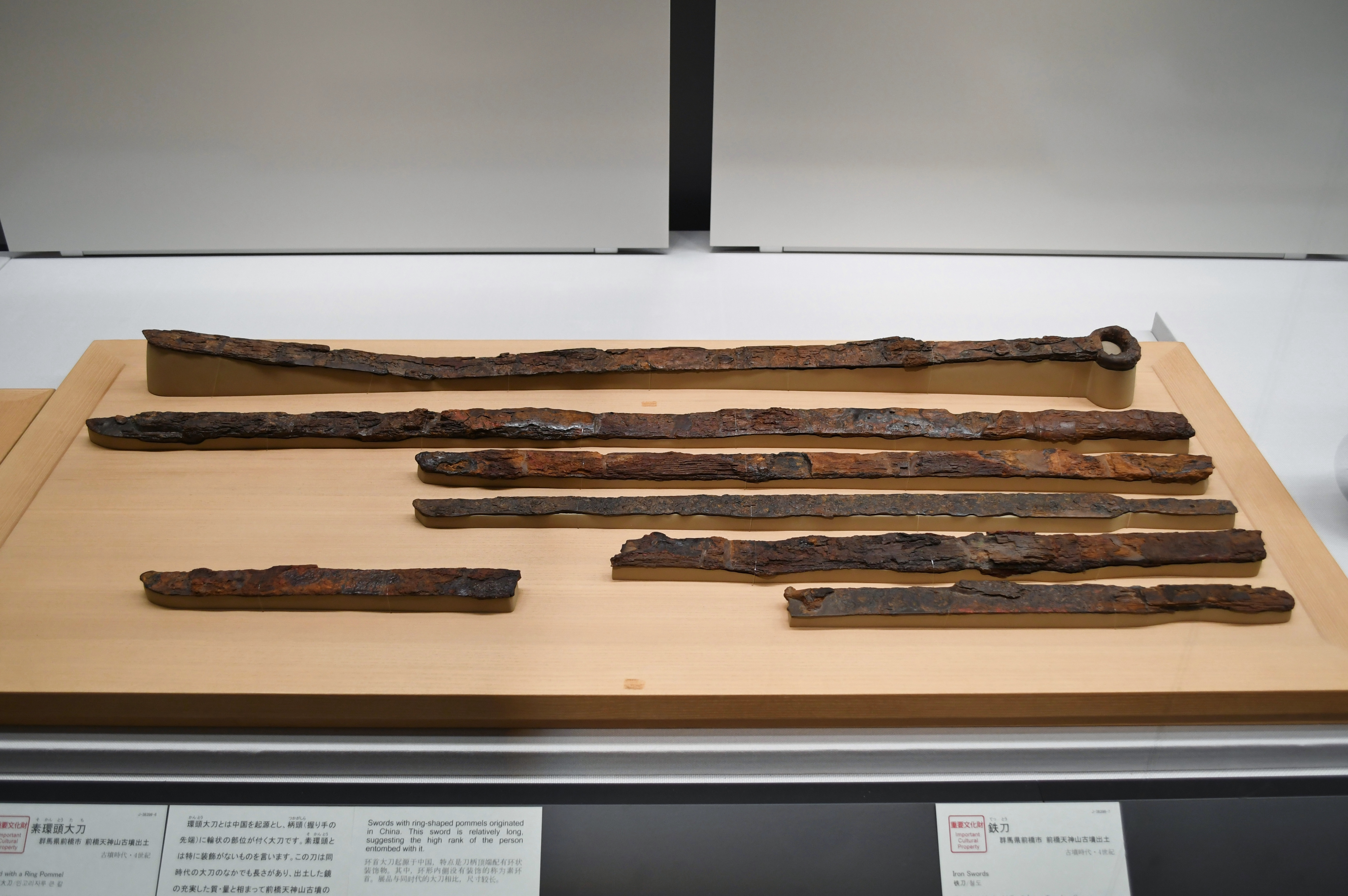
Sword with plain ring pommel and iron sword

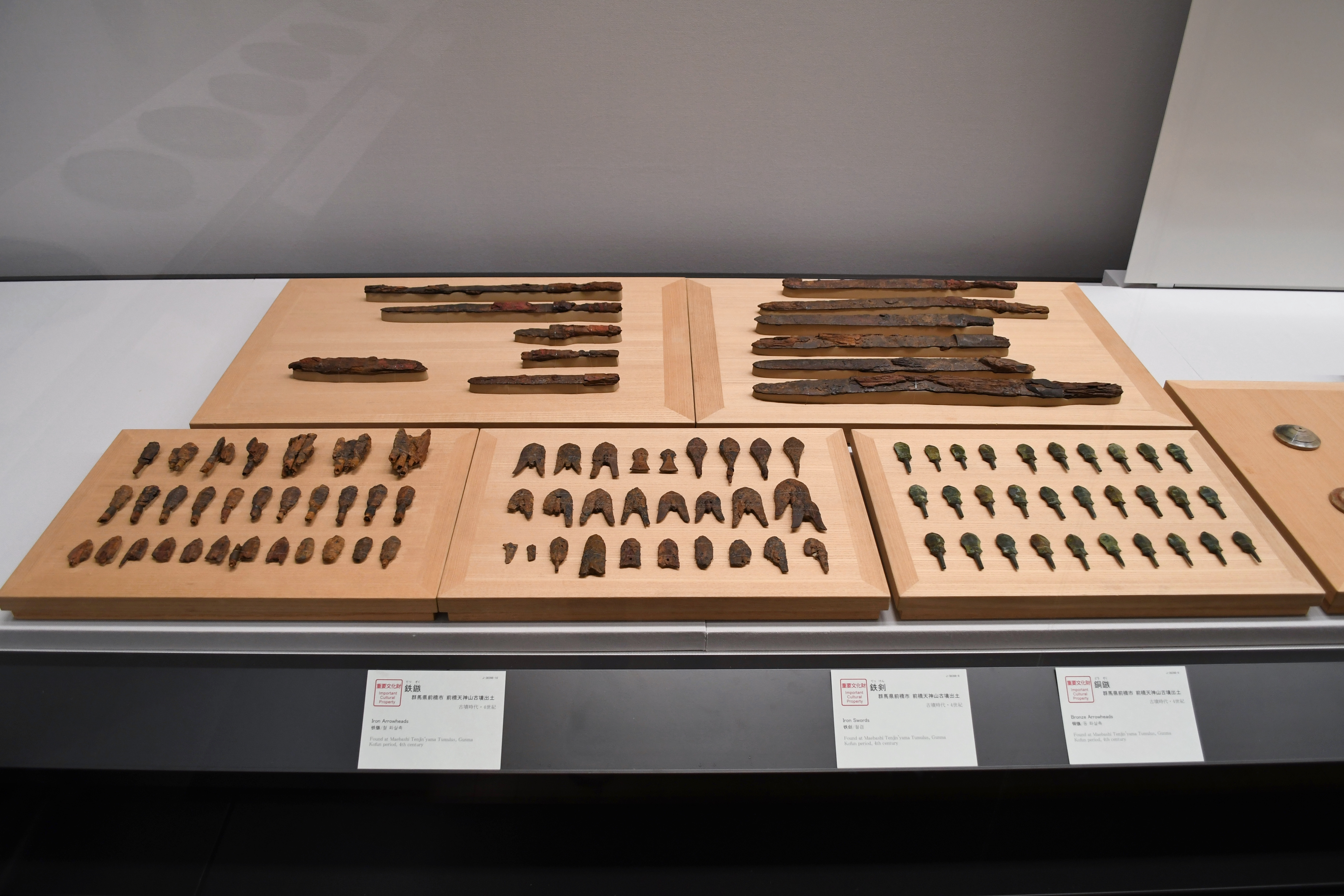
Iron sword, iron arrowhead, and bronze arrowhead

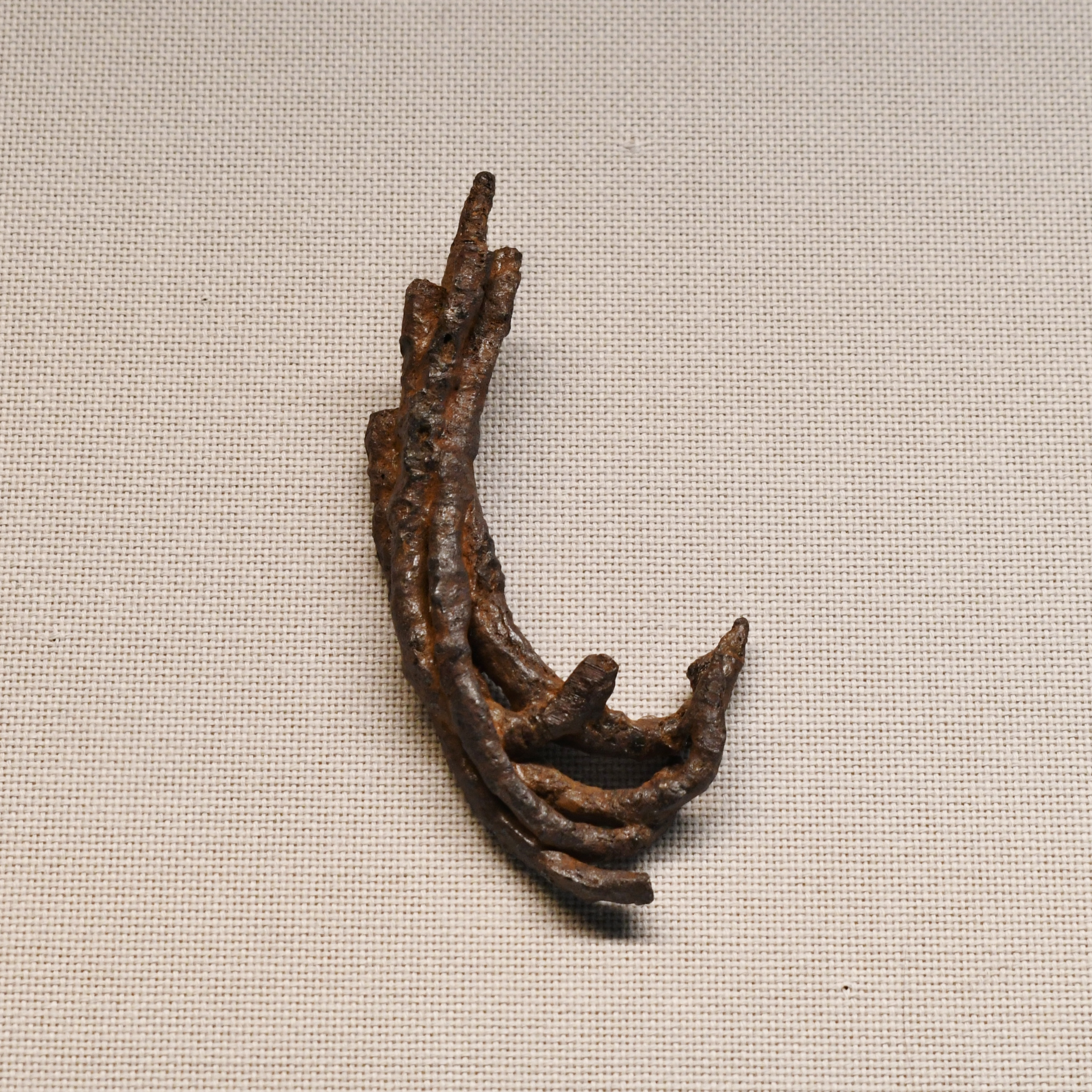
Iron fishhook

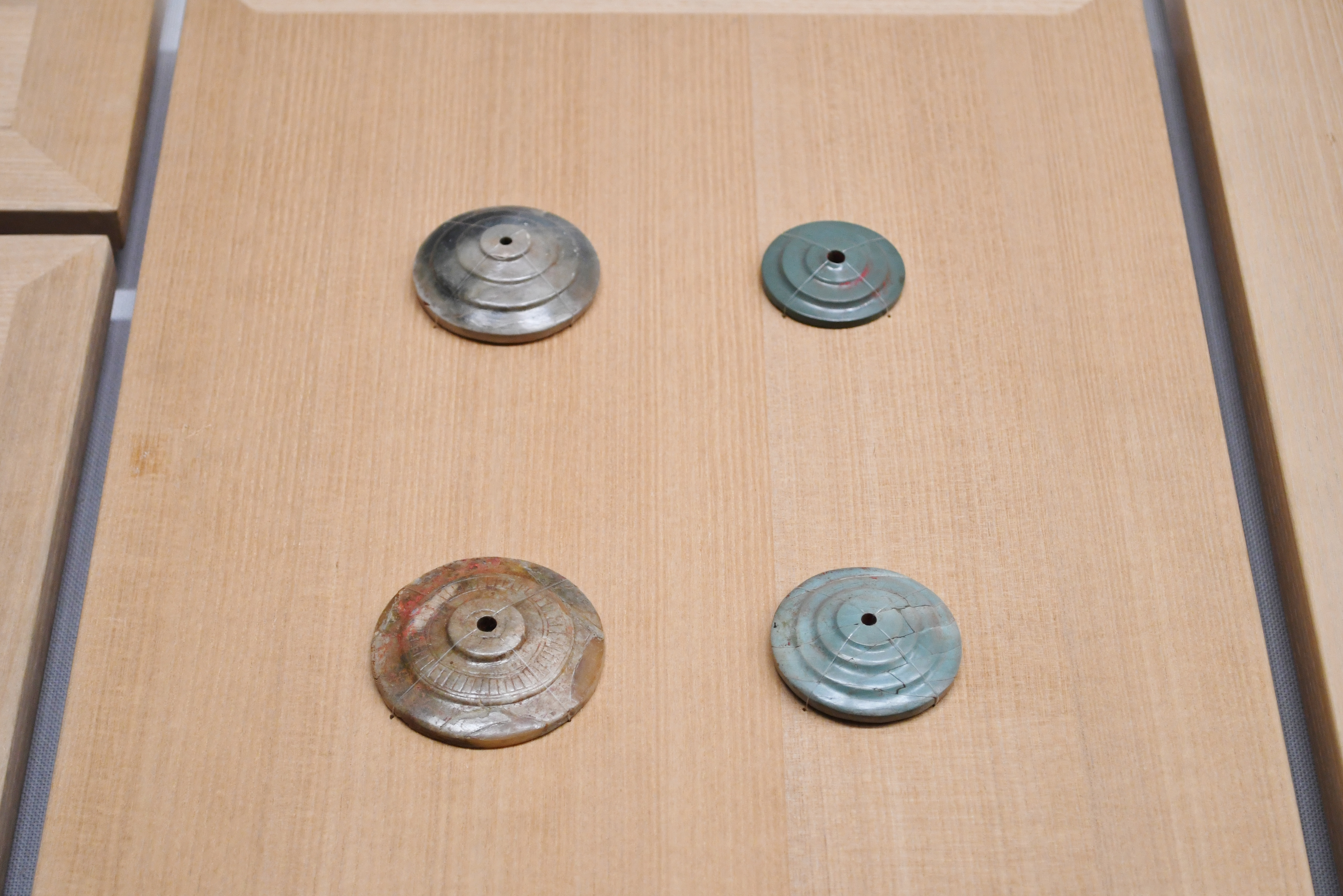
Jasper spindle wheel

== See also ==
- List of Historic Sites of Japan (Gunma)
