= Tenri Health Care University =

Private university headquartered in Tenri City, Nara Prefecture

Coordinates: 34°36′24.2″N 135°50′10″E

- 天理医療大学
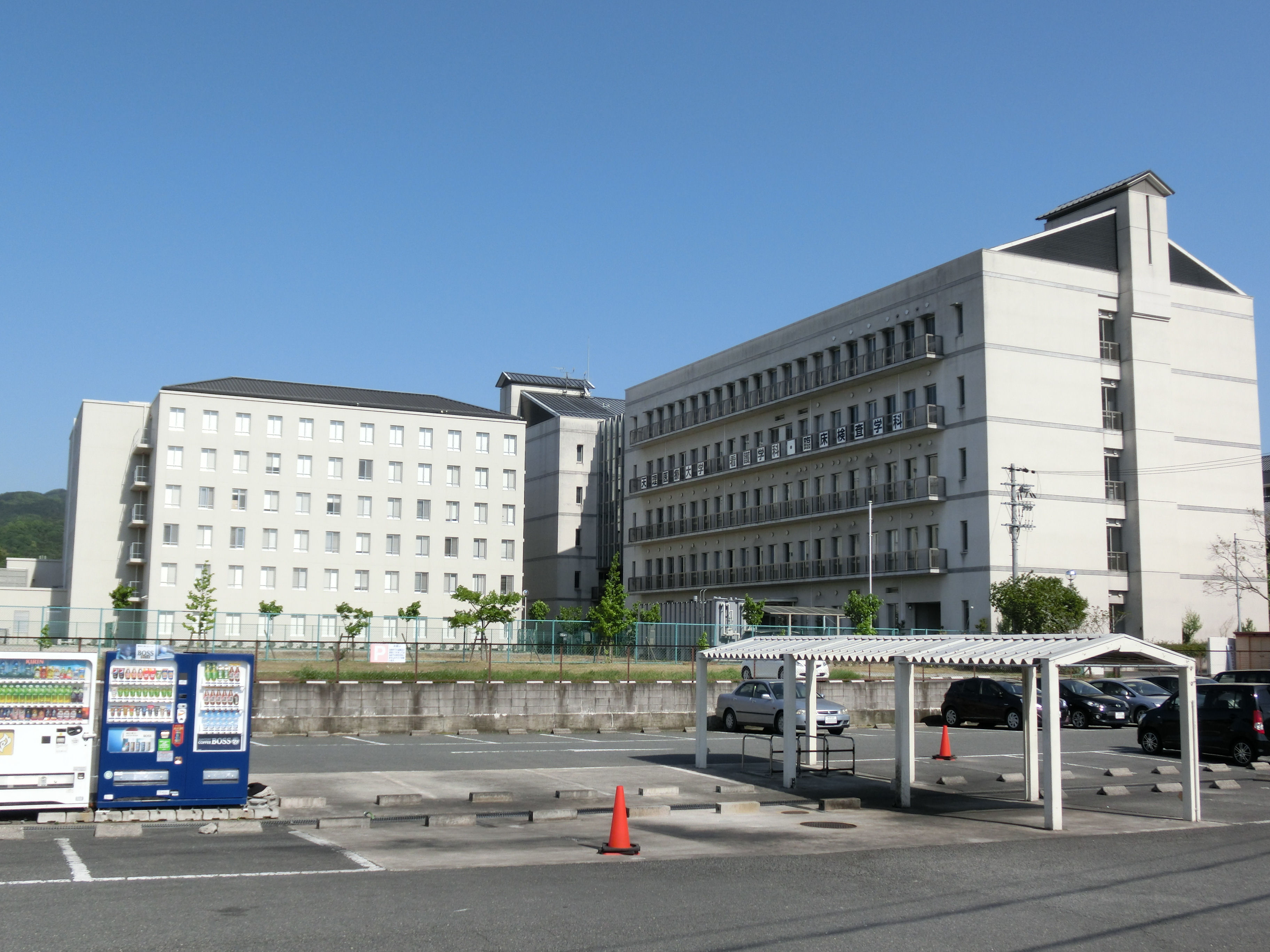
- Type: Private
- Active: 2012–2023
- Location: Tenri, Nara, Japan
- Website: http://www.tenriyorozu-u.ac.jp/

Tenri Health Care University (天理医療大学, Tenri Iryō Daigaku) was a private university in Tenri, Nara, Japan. It was merged with Tenri University after April 1, 2023.

== Academic departments ==
- Nursing
- Medical laboratory science
