= Akatsuchiyama Kofun =

Kofun period keyhole-shaped burial mound in Japan

- 赤土山古墳 (Japanese)
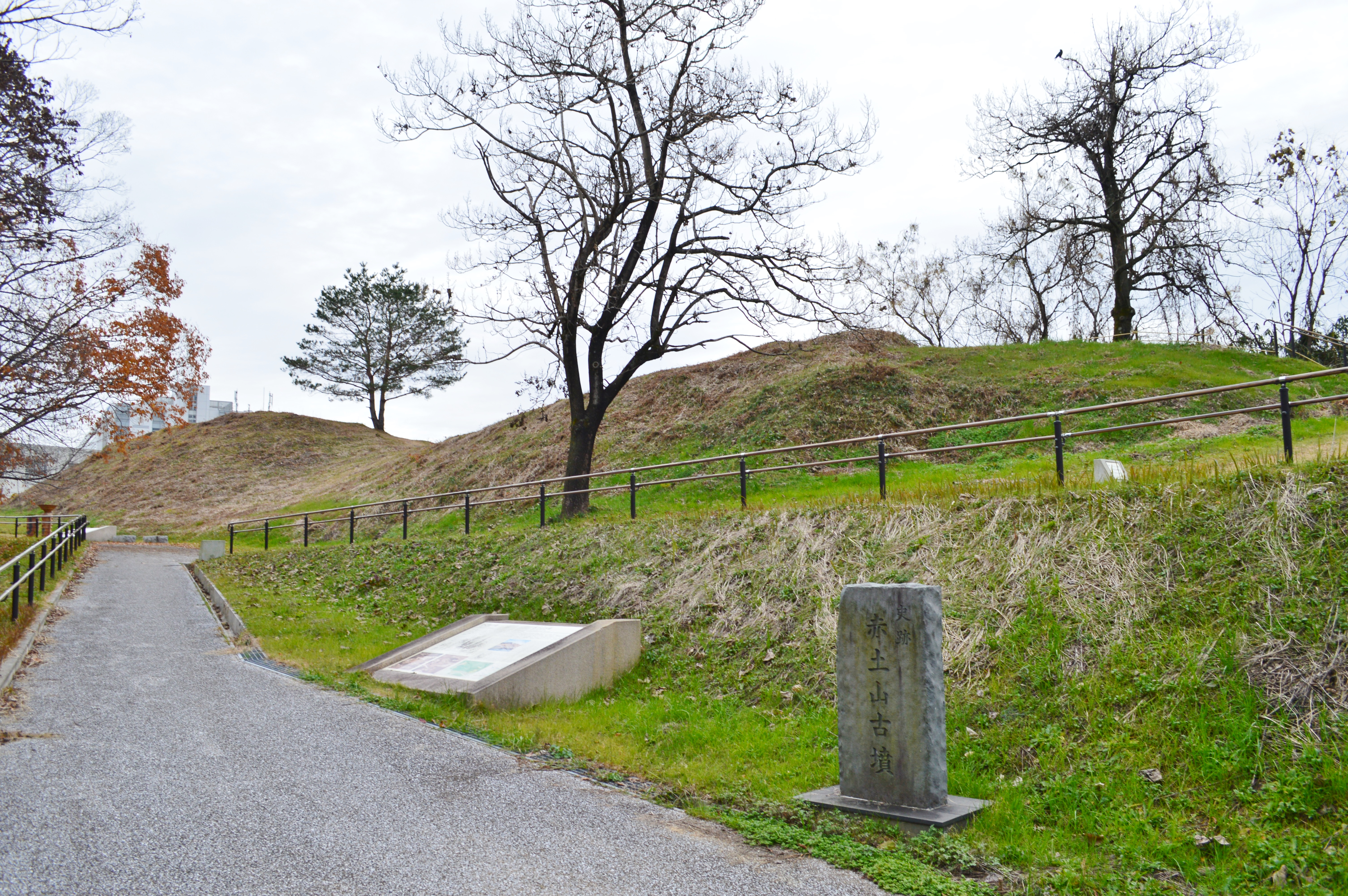
- Akatsuchiyama Kofun

- Akatsuchiyama Kofun Akatsuchiyama Kofun (Japan)
- 34°37′10.1″N 135°50′22.52″E
- Type: Kofun
- Periods: Kofun period
- Location: Tenri, Nara, Japan
- Region: Kansai region

History
- Built: c.4th- 5th century

Site notes
- Public access: Yes (no facilities)
- National Historic Site of Japan

Akatsuchiyama Kofun (赤土山古墳) is a Kofun period keyhole-shaped burial mound, located in the Ichinomoto-cho neighborhood of the city of Tenri, Nara in the Kansai region of Japan. The tumulus was designated a National Historic Site of Japan in 1992. It is one of the tumuli that make up the Tōdaijiyama Kofun Group, which consists of five keyhole-shaped tombs and 40 to 50 circular and square tombs that date mainly from the early to middle Kofun period.

== Overview ==
The Akatsuchiyama Kofun is a zenpō-kōen-fun (前方後円墳), which is shaped like a keyhole, having one square end and one circular end, when viewed from above. It is located in the southeastern part of the Nara Basin, in a hilly area called Tōdaijiyama, which stretches from east-to-west. The south side of the mound has collapsed due to a landslide, and the front end has been leveled As a result of a total of nine archaeological excavations conducted since 1987, it was found to be a keyhole-shaped tumulus with a stepped structure and a remaining mound length of 103.5 meters, with fukiishi covering the entire exterior of the tumulus, and an estimated total original length of 110 meters. There is no moat around the mound, but the front end is divided by a trench. The posterior circular portion is approximately 44 by 33 meters, with rounded corners and a projection at the tip, giving it a unique shape compared to a typical zenpō-kōen-fun. The burial chamber is unclear as it is thought to have been destroyed by a landslide, but it is assumed that it contained a clay coffin, as excavations of the sedimentary soil on the south side of the rear mound have revealed clay coffin fragments, vermilion, stone bracelets, and stone replicas as grave goods. Other grave goods include Haji ware pottery and haniwa clay figures, the latter of which is mainly cylindrical haniwa that surround the mound, as well as figurative haniwa such as house-shaped, lid-shaped, and chicken-shaped haniwa. Some rows of cylindrical haniwa still standing have been discovered during excavations. Based on excavated remains, this tumulus was built in the early Kofun period and is thought to be the grave of a member of the ancient powerful Wani clan.

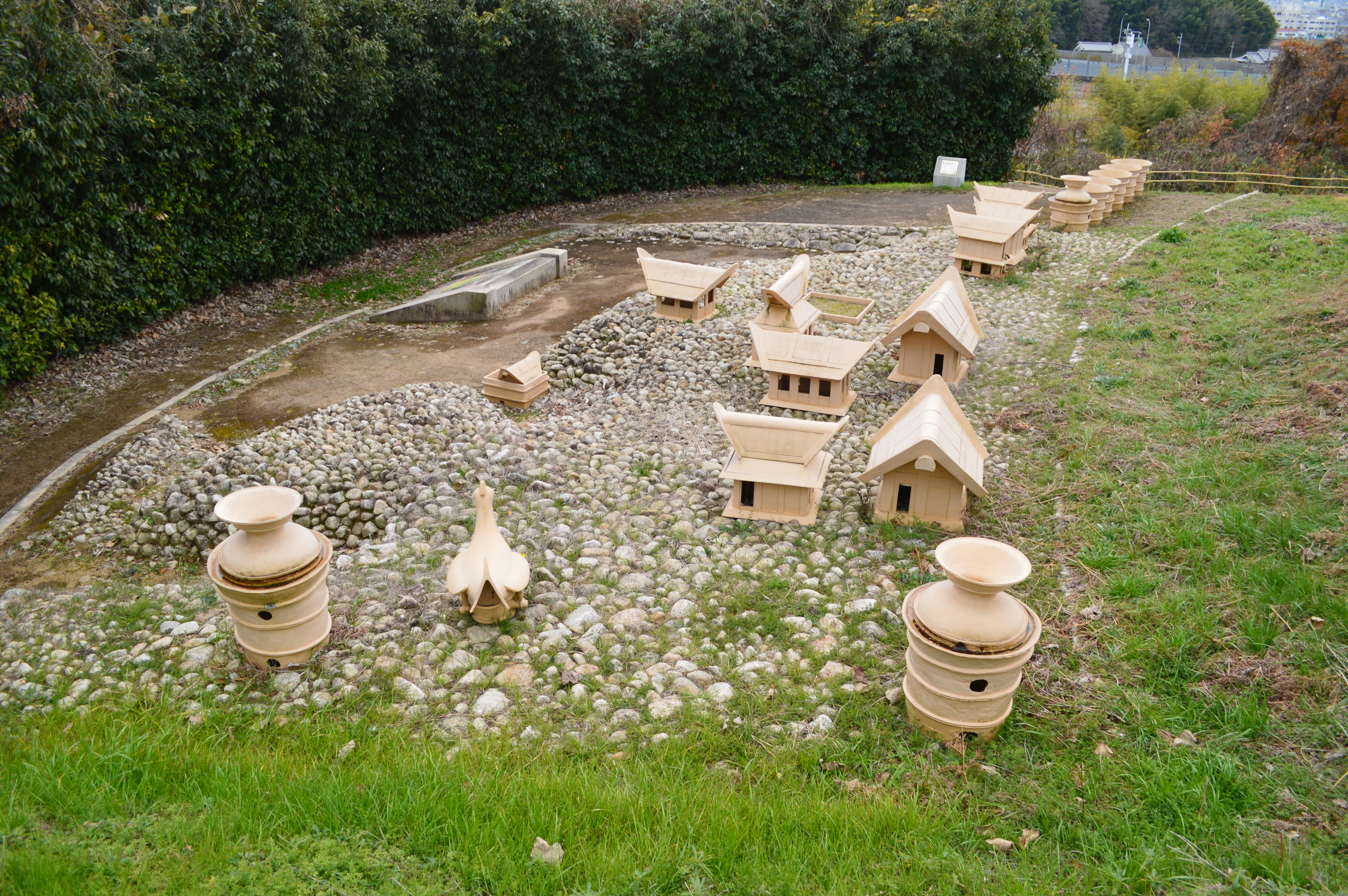
Reproductions of house-shaped haniwa from the Akatsuchiyama Kofun

The site was developed into a park in 2009, and is about a 20-minute walk from Ichinomoto Station on the JR West Sakurai Line.

== See also ==
- List of Historic Sites of Japan (Nara)
