= Kushiyama Kofun =

Kofun period keyhole-shaped burial mound in Japan

- 櫛山古墳 (Japanese)
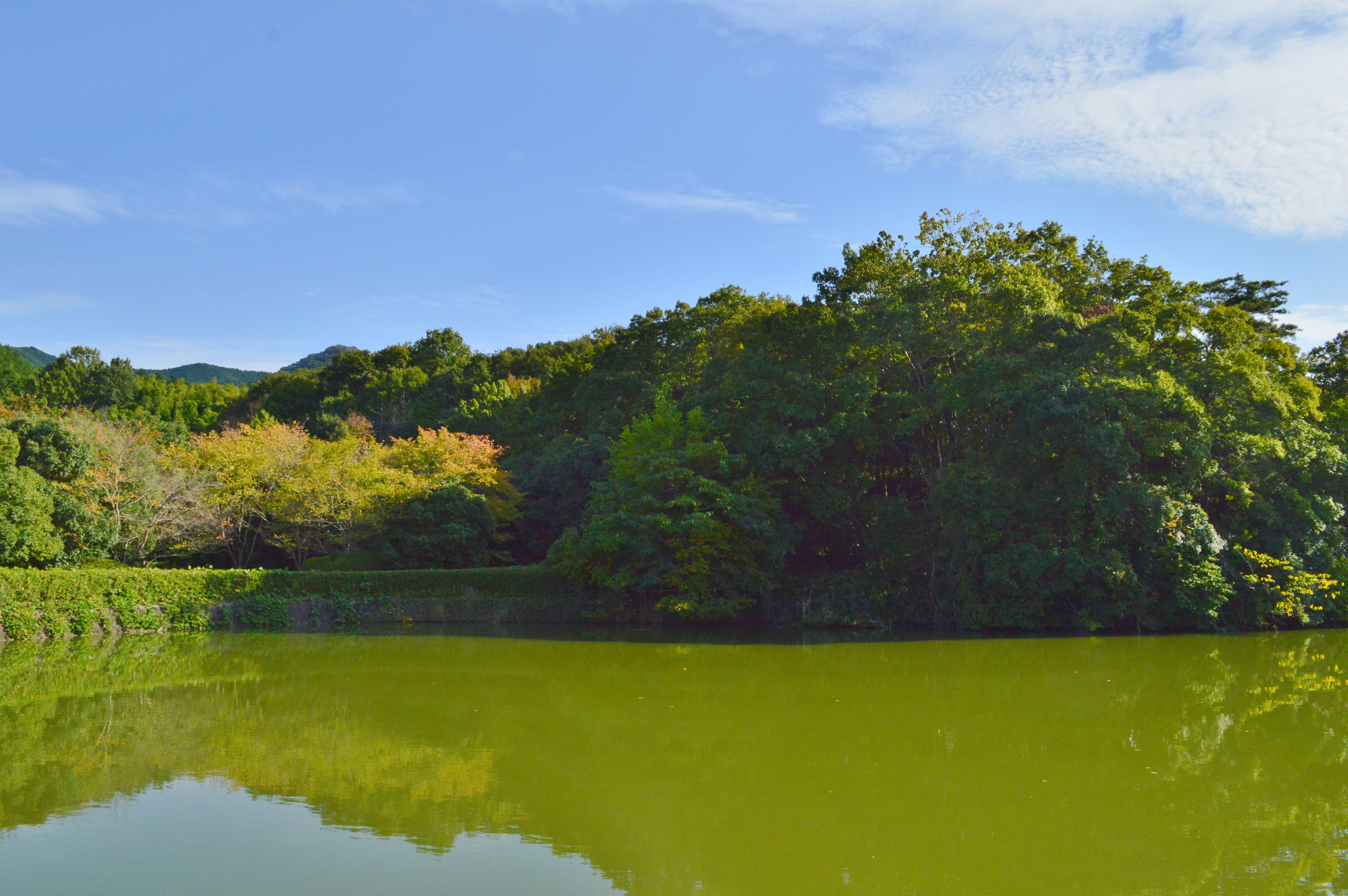
- Kushiyama Kofun

- Kushiyama Kofun Kushiyama Kofun (Japan)
- Interactive map of Kushiyama Kofun
- 34°33′25.0″N 135°51′7.0″E
- Type: Kofun
- Periods: Kofun period
- Location: Tenri, Nara, Japan
- Region: Kansai region

History
- Built: c.4th century

Site notes
- Public access: Yes (no facilities)

Kushiyama Kofun (櫛山古墳) is an early Kofun period burial mound, located in the Yanagimoto neighborhood of the city of Tenri, Nara in the Kansai region of Japan. The tumulus was designated a National Historic Site of Japan in 1957. Kushiyama Kofun is one of the Yanagimoto Kofun Cluster.

== Overview ==
The Kushiyama Kofun is adjacent to the east side of Andonyama Kofun (the tomb of Emperor Sujin). Its shape is highly unusual in that it is a sōhōchūen-fun (双方中円墳), with a central circular mound and short rectangular extensions on either side. For this tumulus, one of the sides is lost, creating a similarity to a typical zenpō-kōen-fun (前方後円墳), which is shaped like a keyhole, having one square end and one circular end, when viewed from above; however there is no narrowing or "neck" connecting the two portions. The tumulus is built up in three tiers, with the tops of the front and middle tiers flat and scattered with white pebbles 3 - 4 centimeters in diameter, suggesting that they were laid out around the burial facility. It is believed that the entire mound was covered with slab-shaped fukiishi about 30 cm in size. An archaeological excavation was carried out in 1948 to preserve the tumulus, revealing that it was 148 meters long, with a diameter of 90 meters at the middle tier, 60 meters in the length and width of the front tier, and 25 meters in the rear tier. A moat remains around the tumulus, measuring 190 meters east–west and 165 meters north–south, with the width of the moat on the side of the front tier being approximately 56 meters.

In the center of the central circular portion, there is a vertical-entry stone burial chamber perpendicular to the main axis, with an estimated total length of 7.1 meters, width of about 1.4 meters, and height of over 1.2 meters. This was excavated when the Japanese military constructed an airfield nearby in 1943. There was no burial facility at the rear mound of the tumulus, but there was a ritual facility. After the burials were completed, rituals were conducted out in which jasper bracelets, magatama and tubular beads, iron swords, knives and axes, and clay products imitating these and other everyday objects, were intentionally broken and thrown into a large excavated hole along with the stone blocks. A piece of a stone coffin lid with a rope hanging protrusion and a stone piece that is thought to be the bottom of the coffin from the end plate were excavated from inside the burial chamber, and it is assumed that a long-shaped stone coffin was placed in the depression in the center,

The tumulus about a 15-minute walk from Yanagimoto Station on the JR West Sakurai Line

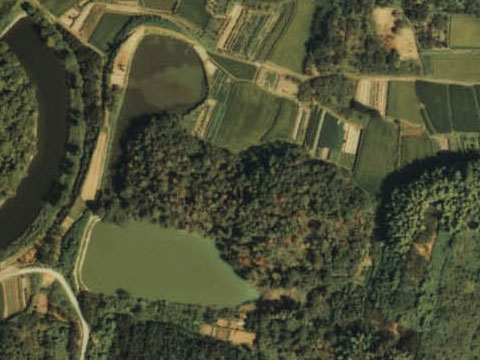
Aerial view of Kushiyama Kofun

== See also ==
- List of Historic Sites of Japan (Nara)
