= Mesuriyama Kofun =

Kofun period keyhole-shaped burial mound in Japan

- メスリ山古墳 (Japanese)
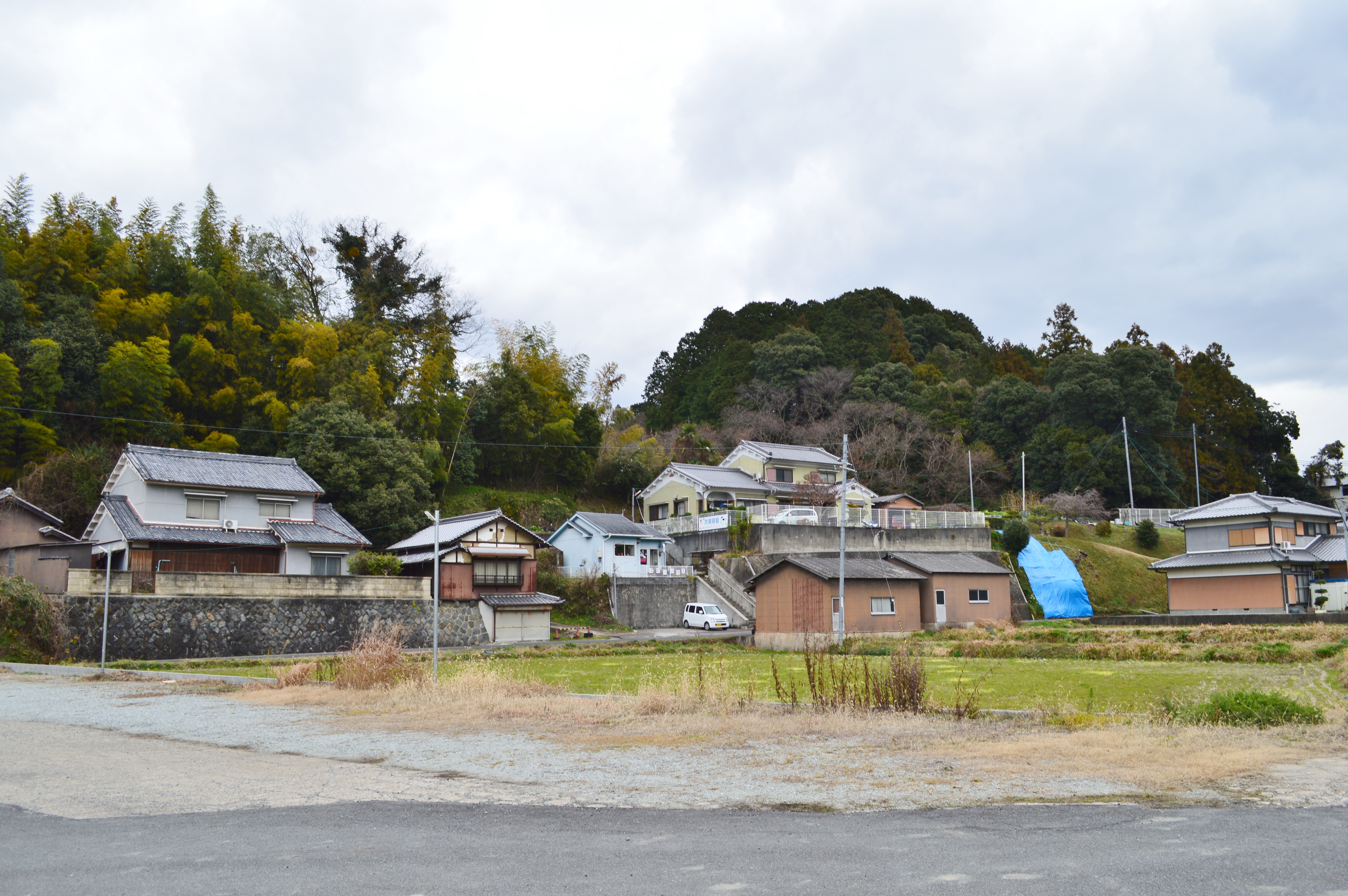
- Mesuriyama Kofun

- Mesuriyama Kofun Mesuriyama Kofun (Japan)
- Interactive map of Mesuriyama Kofun
- 34°29′56″N 135°50′52″E
- Type: Kofun
- Periods: Kofun period
- Location: Sakurai, Nara, Japan
- Region: Kansai region

History
- Built: c.4th century

Site notes
- Public access: Yes (no facilities)

Mesuriyama Kofun (メスリ山古墳) is an early Kofun period burial mound, located in the Takada neighborhood of the city of Sakurai, Nara in the Kansai region of Japan. The tumulus was designated a National Historic Site of Japan in 1980.

== Overview ==
The Mesuriyama Kofun is located on the left bank of the Hatsuse River and belongs to the Torimiyama Kofun Cluster along with the Sakurai Chausuyama Kofun, which has a separate National Historic Site designation. The Mesuriyama Kofun was excavated from 1959 to 1962. The tumulus is a zenpō-kōen-fun (前方後円墳), which is shaped like a keyhole, having one square end and one circular end, when viewed from above. It is orientated to the west, and has a total length of 224 meters. The posterior circular portion has a diameter of 128 meters and height of 19 meters. The anterior rectangular portion has a width of 80 meters at the front and a height of 8 meters. The slopes of the three-tiered mound is covered with head-sized fukiishi roofing stones, and rows of haniwa in between each tier. In the center of the circular mound is a double square section, with huge haniwa clay figures in the shape of high stands and vessel platforms arranged perpendicular to the main axis of the mound, and a staggered arrangement of haniwa clay figures between the two rows, creating a distinctive layout. These pedestal-type haniwa are 2.4 meters high and 1.3 meters in diameter, and are the largest in Japan. Inside this row of haniwa clay figures is a square platform, beneath which is the main burial chamber, a pit-style stone chamber.

The burial chamber is approximately 8.06 meters long, 1.18 meters wide, and 1.76 meters high, and is covered by eight ceiling stones. A wooden coffin was placed in the burial chamber, but due to grave robbery, almost no remains remain. Grave goods unearthed in the main chamber included fragments of a bronze mirror (a triangular-rimmed divine-animal mirror), jadeite magatama, jasper tubular beads, stone bracelets imitating shell rings, miniature stone chairs, combs, and bowls. The secondary burial chamber next to the main chamber is 6 meters long, 70 centimeters wide, and 60-70 centimeters high. There were no remains inside, only grave goods, and it is thought to have been a storage facility or a repository for the personal belongings of the deceased. It escaped grave robbery. many artifacts were found to be in perfect preservation. These grave goods included 212 tipped iron spears, about half of which were shaped so that their tips faced each other at either end of the stone chamber. All of them are thought to have had long handles. They were weapons used in group battles. Iron spearheads with iron sword-shaped tips have also been excavated in the southern part of the Korean Peninsula and in northern Kyushu, and were the main weapon of the time. This weapon was very popular in the Japanese archipelago, and there is no doubt that forging techniques were also used in Japan. The hoard also included 236 bronze arrowheads, 50 stone arrowheads, one iron bow (182 cm long, with an iron string), five iron arrows (80 cm long), and a lacquered shield. The iron bow and arrows were intended for intimidation purposes, not for practical use. Two iron swords, 14 axes, a 19 iron sickles, a chisel, and agricultural tools such as an awl, a knife, and a saw were also among the grave goods. These artifacts have been collectively designated as an Important Cultural Property.

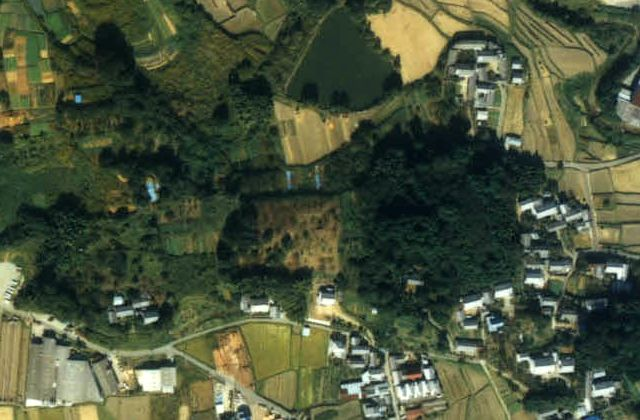
Aerial view

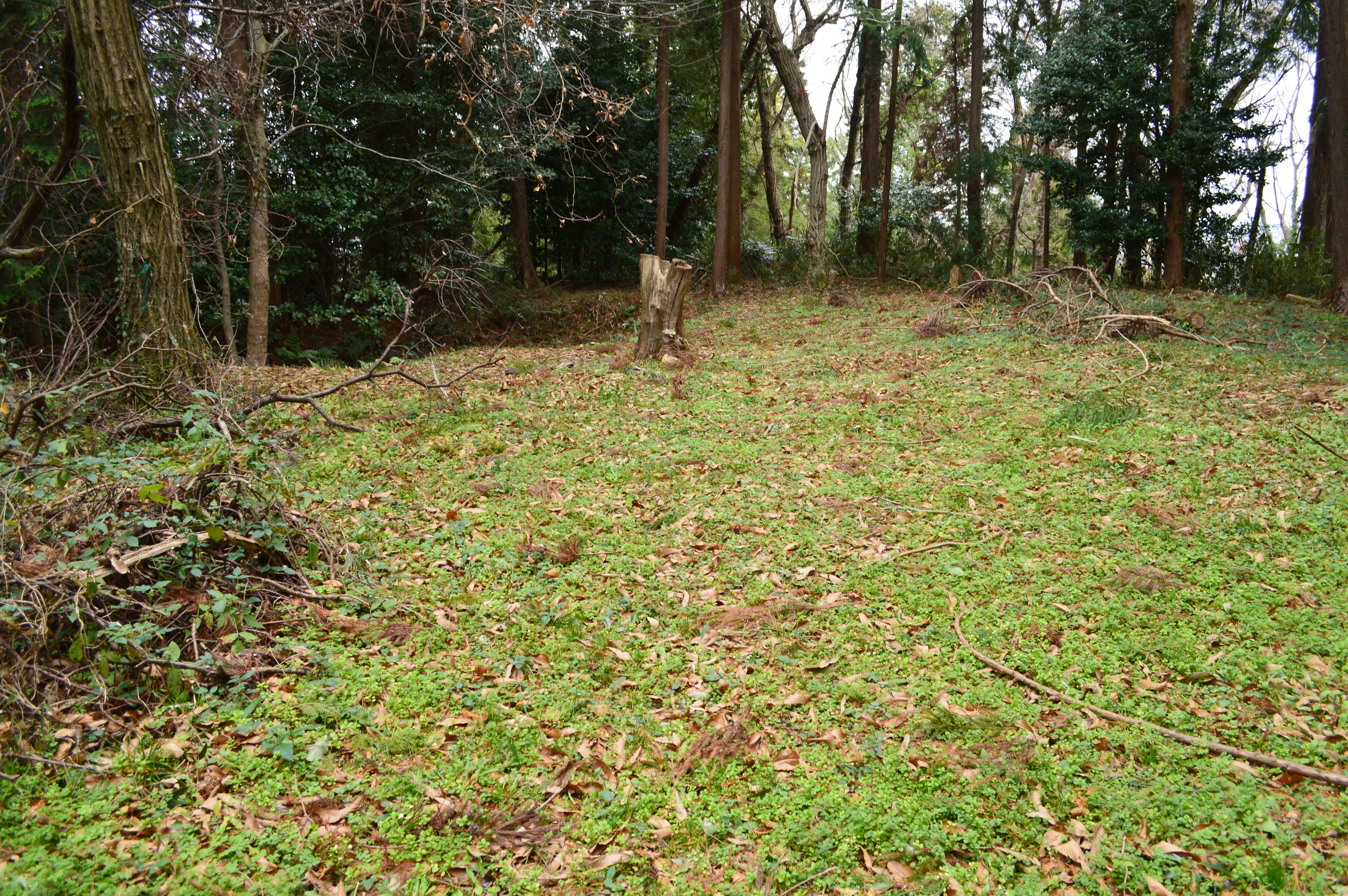
The top of the circular mound

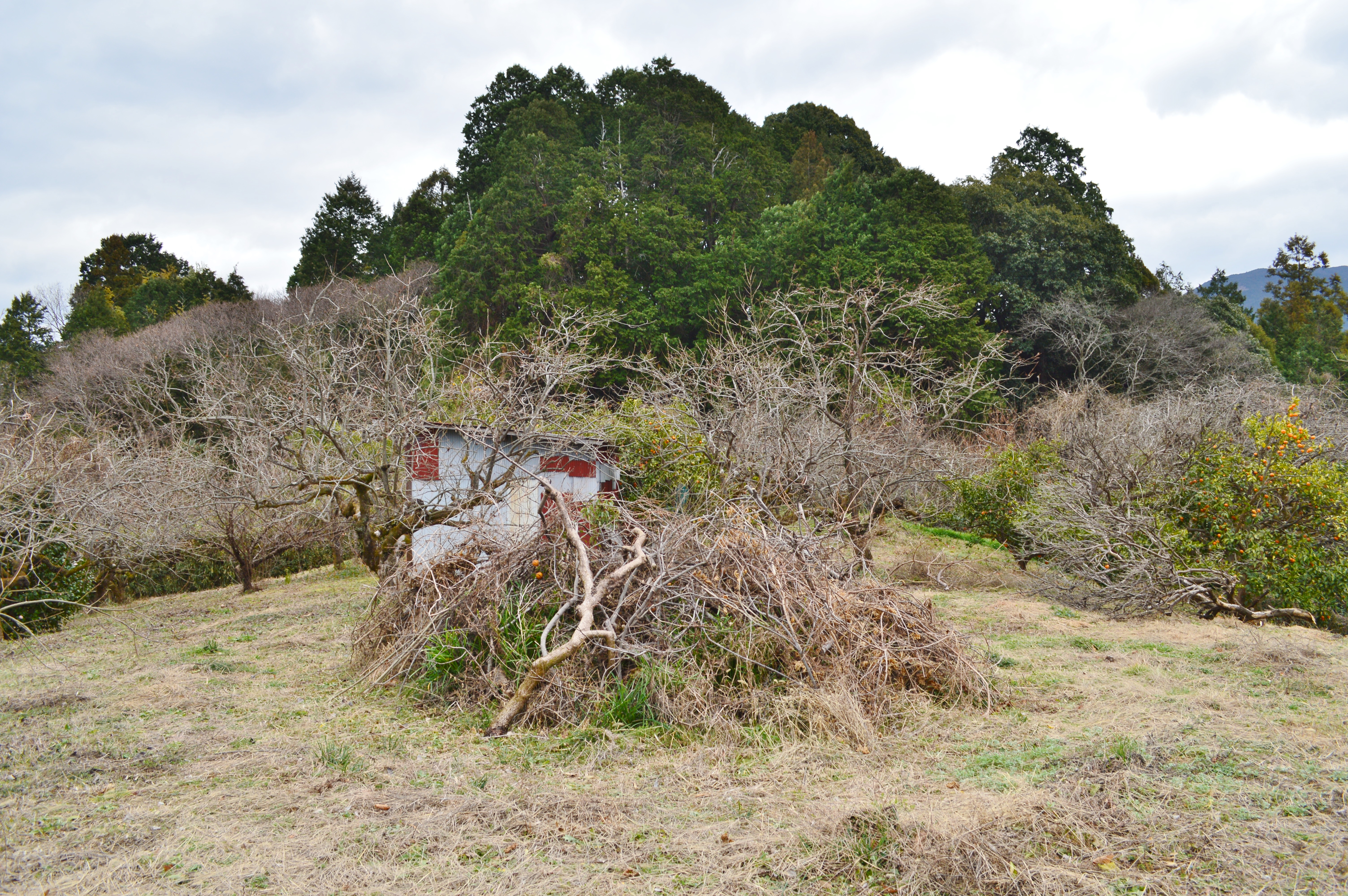
View of the circular mound from the front

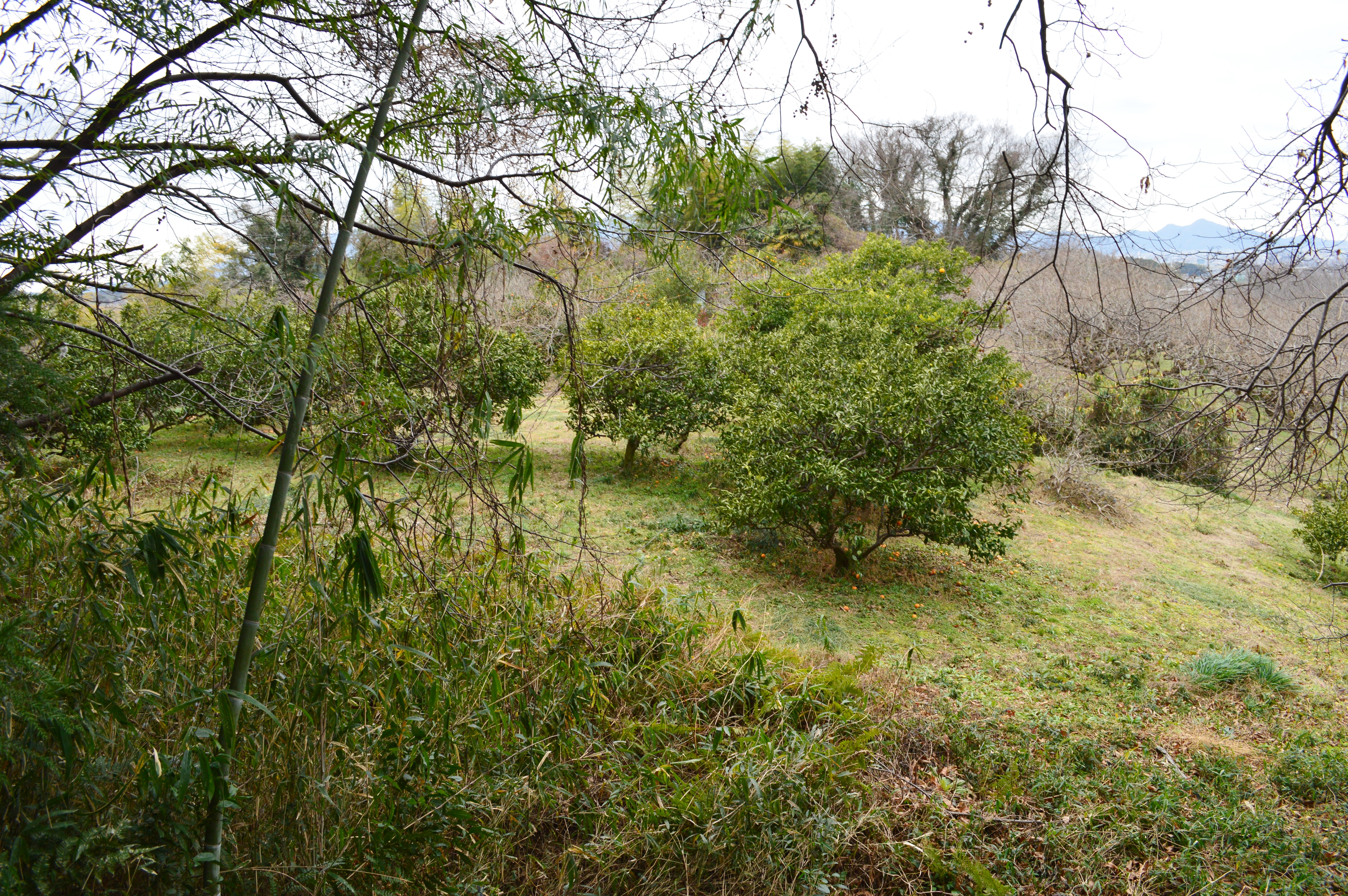
View of the front part from the circular mound

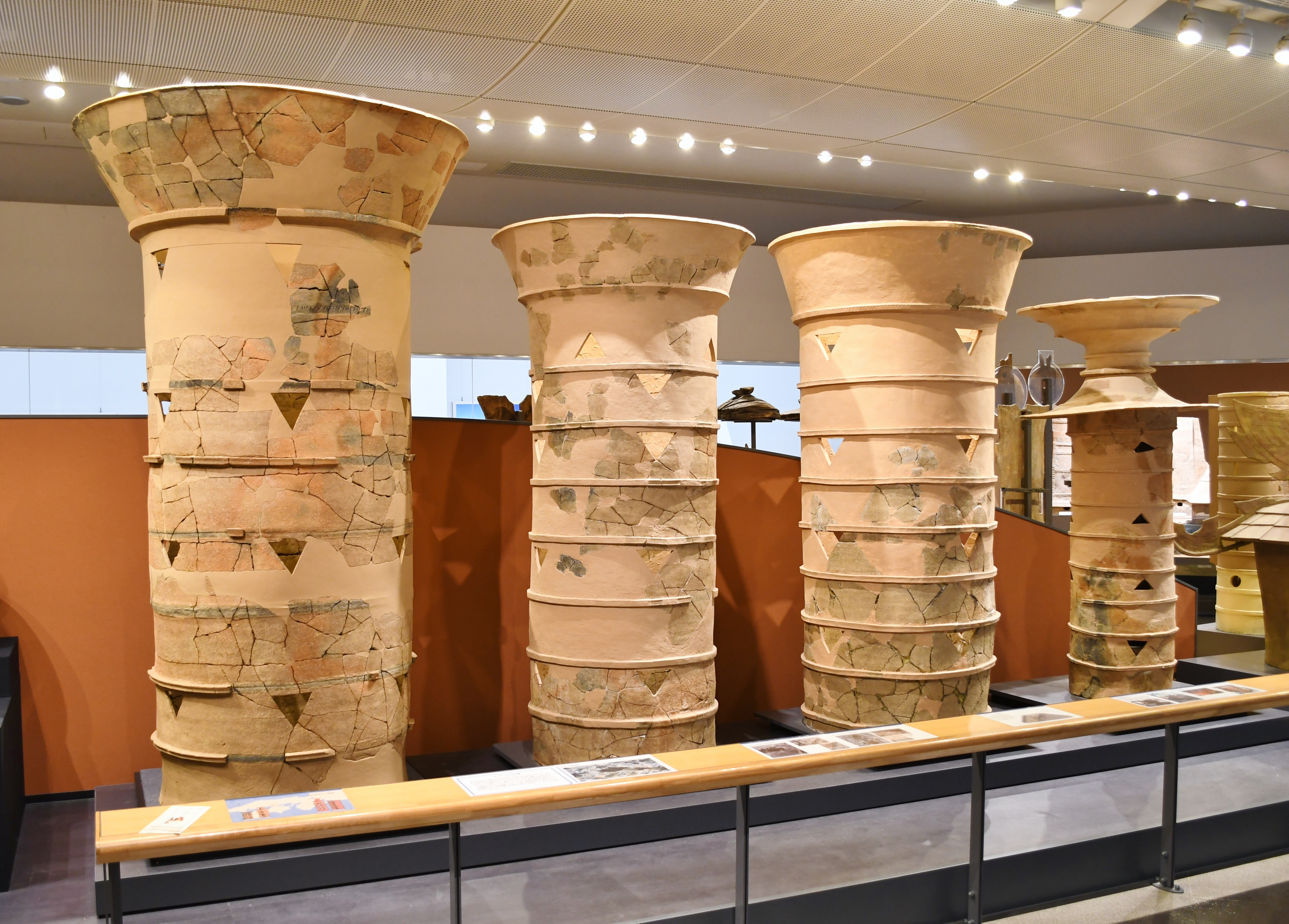
Large cylindrical haniwa at the Nara Prefectural Kashihara Archaeological Institute

Judging from the size of the mound, the size of the haniwa, and the richness of the grave goods, it is believed to be the tomb of a chieftain with great power, but there us no mention of this kofun as being a royal tomb in historical documentation such as the Kojiki or Nihon Shoki.

The tumulus is about 1.7 kilometers due south from Sakurai Station on the Kintetsu Railway Osaka Line.

== See also ==
- List of Historic Sites of Japan (Nara)
