= Sakurai Chausuyama Kofun =

Kofun period keyhole-shaped burial mound in Japan

- 桜井茶臼山古墳 (Japanese)
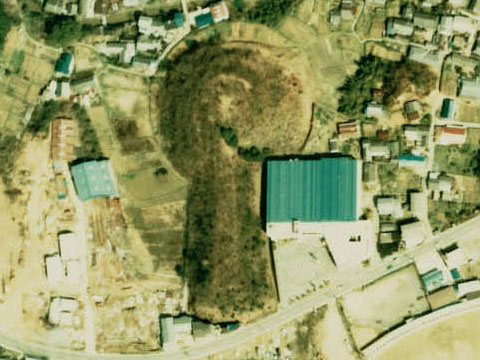
- Sakurai Chausuyama Kofun

- Sakurai Chausuyama Kofun Sakurai Chausuyama Kofun (Japan)
- Interactive map of Sakurai Chausuyama Kofun
- 34°30′42″N 135°51′25″E
- Type: Kofun
- Periods: Kofun period
- Location: Sakurai, Nara, Japan
- Region: Kansai region

History
- Built: c.4th century

Site notes
- Public access: Yes (no facilities)

Sakurai Chausuyama Kofun (桜井茶臼山古墳) is a Kofun period burial mound, located in the Tobiyama neighborhood of the city of Sakurai, Nara in the Kansai region of Japan. The tumulus was designated a National Historic Site of Japan in 1980. It is thought to have been built in the latter half of the 3rd century, the next generation after Hashihaka Kofun.

== Overview ==
The Sakurai Chausuyama Kofun is located on a natural hill the left bank of the Hatsuse River and belongs to the Torimiyama Kofun Cluster along with the Mesuriyama Kofun, which has a separate National Historic Site designation. The Sakurai Chausuyama Kofun is 207-meters long with a long and narrow anterior portion and dates from the very early Kofun period. The tumulus is a zenpō-kōen-fun (前方後円墳), which is shaped like a keyhole, having one square end and one circular end, when viewed from above. The existence of this tumulus was discovered only after World War II as it was covered with scrub and looked like a simple hill. The circular rear portion of the mound is built in three tiers and the rectangular anterior portion in two tiers, and the entire surface is covered with fukiishi roofing stones. It has a long, slender anterior section and a handle-shaped mirror-style form. The mound was constructed by shaping the bedrock at the top of the hill, a process known as hill-end cutting. There is no surrounding moat, but a large rectangular area has been created. A rectangular platform with stone paving measuring 9.75 x 12.5 meters on each side is located at the top of the mound, and a square circle of perforated jars (double-rimmed jars) are placed around the base of the platform. Apart from this, there are no traces of special vessel pedestals or cylindrical haniwa as was the case with the Mesuriyama Kofun. The stepped surface is covered with fukiishi roofing stones.The tumulus is surrounded by a moat. A ground-penetrating radar survey in 2007 confirmed the existence of an underground stone drainage ditch to drain rainwater that had soaked into the mound.

Archaeological excavations of the rear circular rear portion were carried out from 1949 to 1950, and it was designated a National Historic Site in 1973. Surveys of the surrounding area were subsequently conducted, and the top of the circular rear part was re-excavated in 2009. The burial chamber is a vertical-entry pit-style stone chamber. It contained a 6.7-meter-long wooden coffin, which has already been looted. The chamber measured about 1.2 meters wide and 1.7 meters high, with walls made of 30–40 cm-wide slabs of stone stacked like bricks, and the ceiling is blocked by 12 huge stones. The entire chamber is painted with cinnabar. The remains of square pillars have been found around the chamber, which are thought to be the remains of a fence. The stones used to make the burial chamber were from Numashima, an island south of Awaji Island, indicating that the person buried in the tumulus had the authority and wealth to obtain huge stone materials from a considerable distance. Although the grave goods had been looted, more than 103 bronze mirror fragments were discovered. Restoration work revealed that these fragments came from more than 81 bronze mirrors, the largest number even found in a tomb in Japan. One of the fragments had Chinese characters and measurements matched a triangular-rimmed god-and-beast mirror with an inscription from the first year of the Zhengshi era (240), that was excavated from the Kanisawa Kofun in Gunma Prefecture. A theory has emerged that this is one of the 100 bronze mirrors bestowed by the Emperor Wei to Himiko, as described in the Wajinden. These factors have let to speculation by the Kashihara Archaeological Institute of Nara Prefecture in 2023 that this was the tomb of an early Yamato king. On the other hand, this tomb and Mesuriyama Kofun are not mentioned historical documents such as the Kojiki or Nihon Shoki, and were built in a place relatively far from the Makimuku ruins.

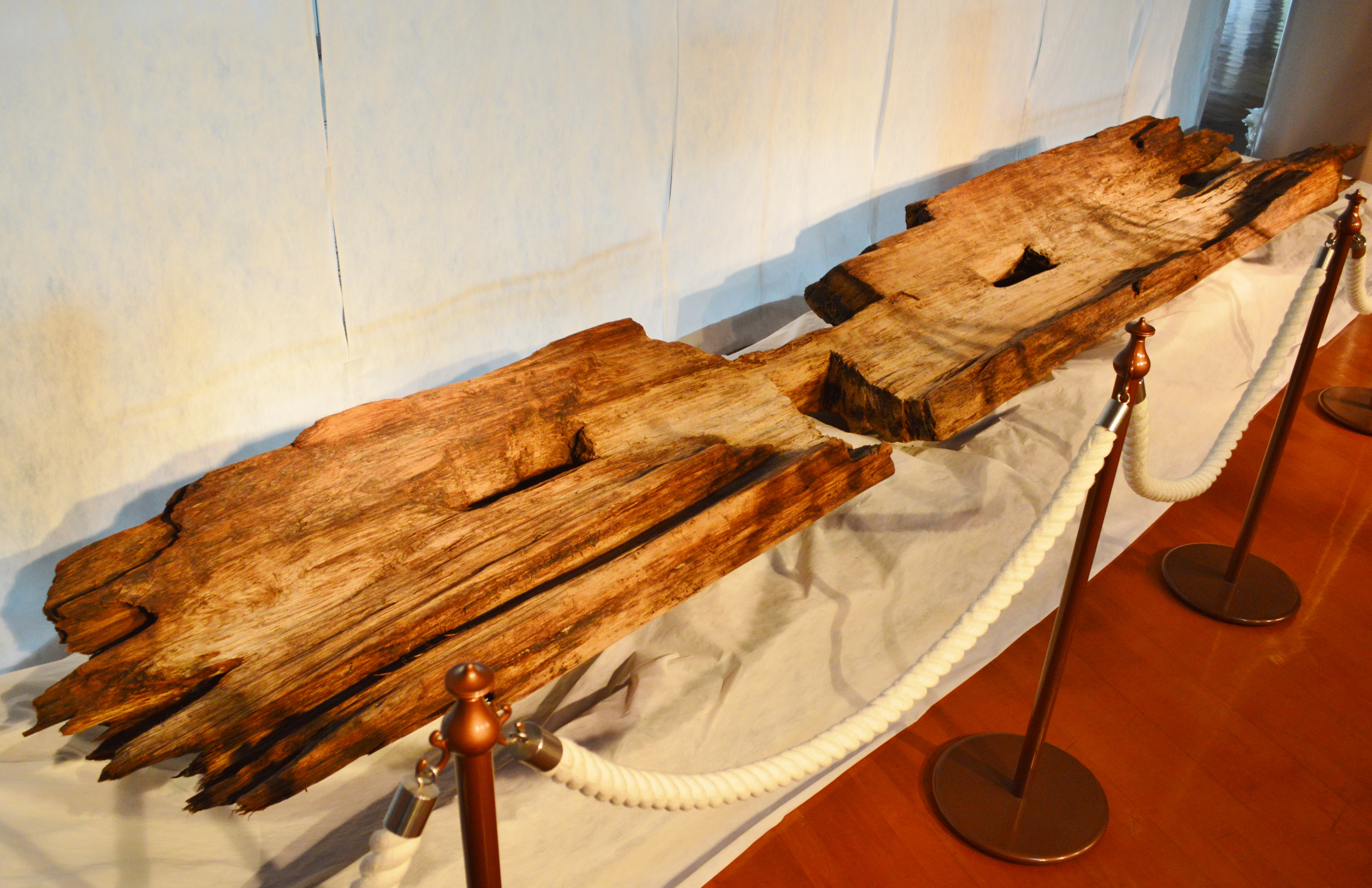
Wooden coffin excavated from Sakurai Chausuyama Tomb
(Kashihara Archaeological Research Institute Museum)

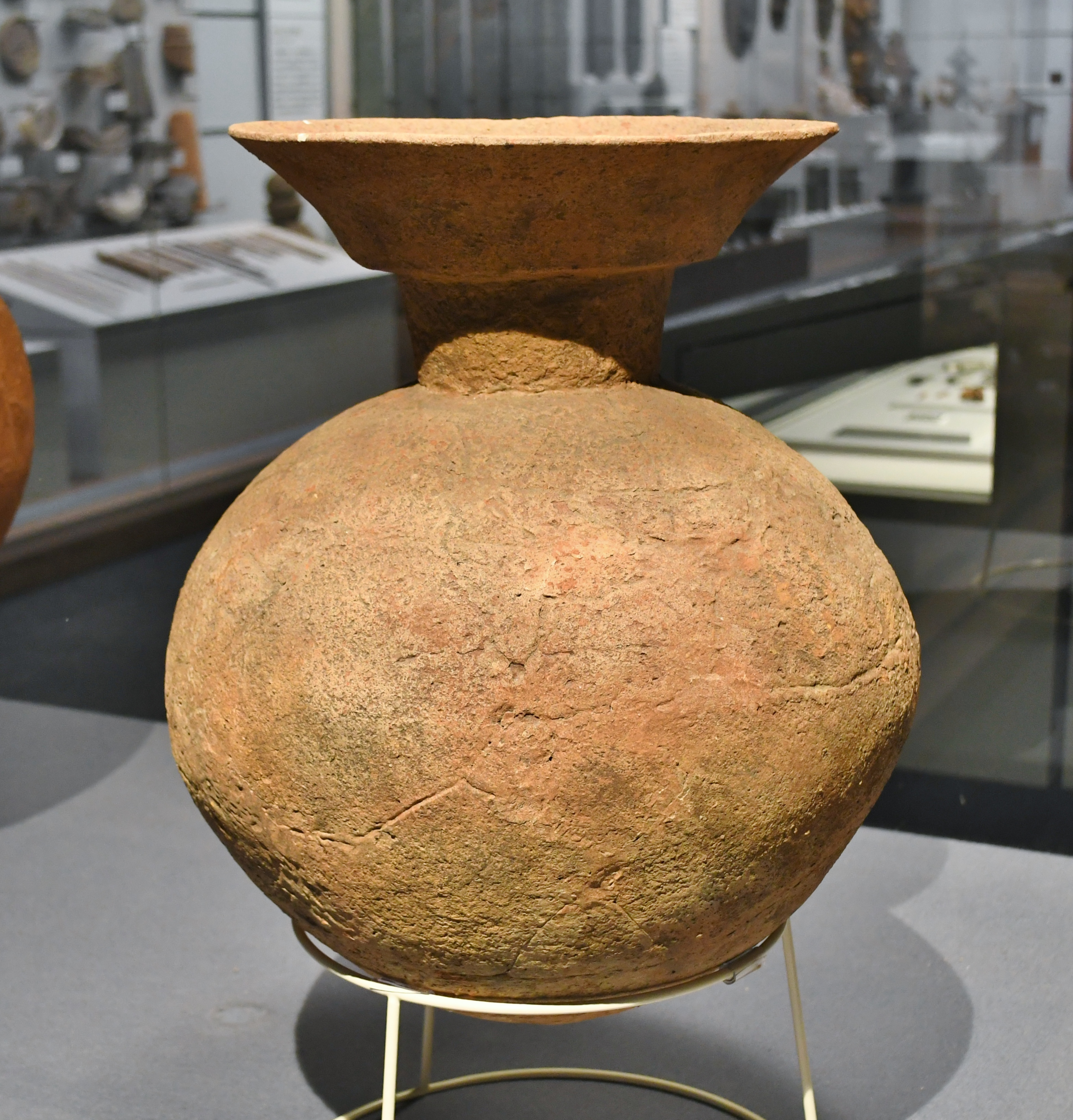
Double-rimmed jar excavated from Sakurai Chausuyama Kofun
(Kokugakukan University Museum)

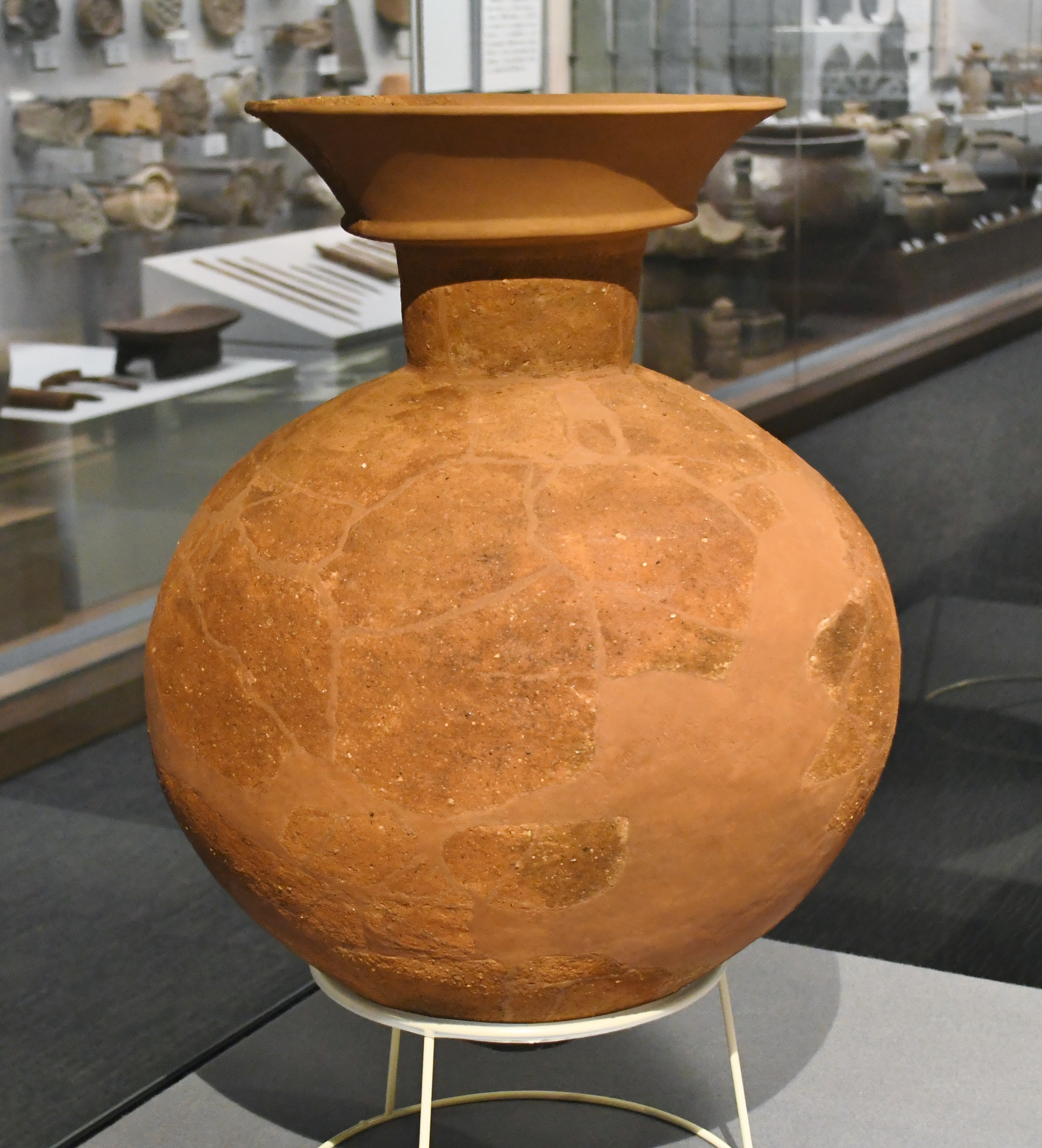
Double-rimmed jar excavated from Sakurai Chausuyama Kofun
(Kokugakukan University Museum)

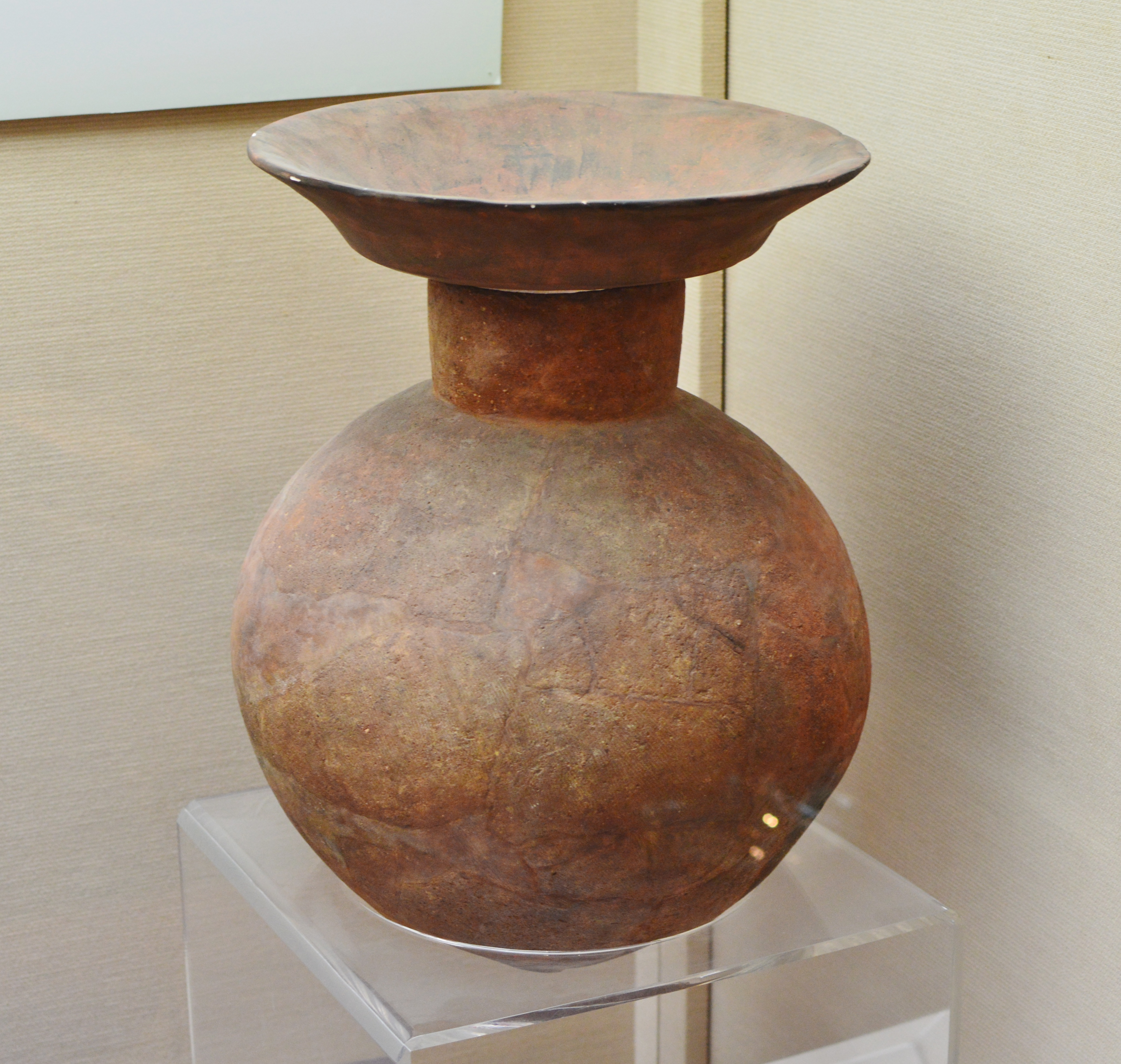
Double-rimmed jar excavated from Chausuyama Tomb Kofun
(Sakurai City Buried Cultural Properties Center)

The tumulus is about 1.7 kilometers due south from Sakurai Station on the Kintetsu Railway Osaka Line.

== See also ==
- List of Historic Sites of Japan (Nara)
