= Kurozuka Kofun =

Kofun period keyhole-shaped burial mound in Japan

- 黒塚古墳 (Japanese)
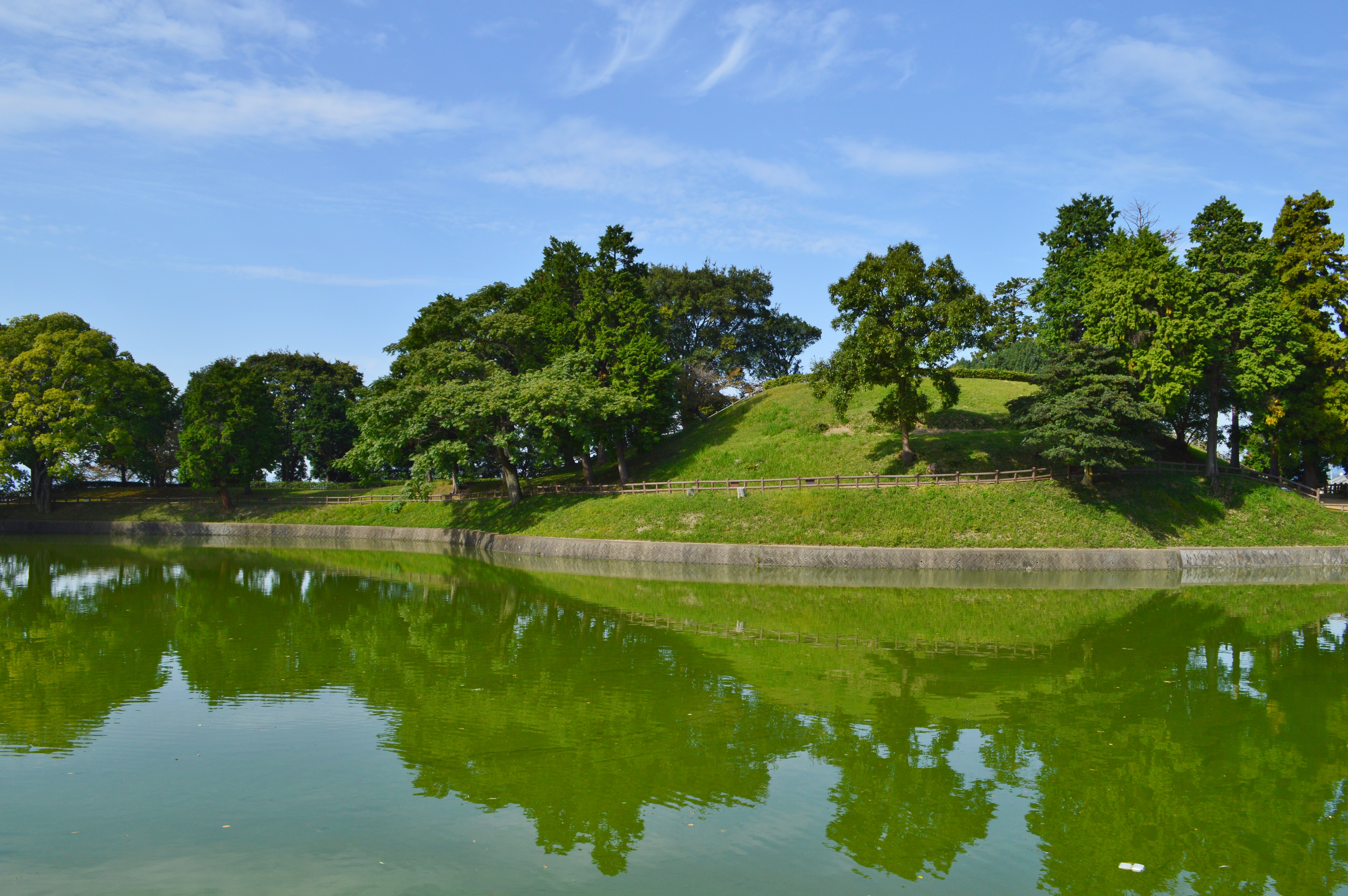
- Kurozuka Kofun

- Kurozuka Kofun Kurozuka Kofun (Japan)
- Interactive map of Kurozuka Kofun
- 34°33′35.73″N 135°50′35.21″E
- Type: Kofun
- Periods: Kofun period
- Location: Tenri, Nara, Japan
- Region: Kansai region

History
- Built: c.3rd century

Site notes
- Public access: Yes (no facilities)

Kurozuka Kofun (黒塚古墳) is a Kofun period keyhole-shaped burial mound, located in the Yanagimoto-cho neighborhood of the city of Tenri, Nara in the Kansai region of Japan. The tumulus was designated a National Historic Site of Japan in 2001. It is noted for the 33 triangular-rimmed bronze mirrors with divine beasts that were excavated in almost the same arrangement as when they were originally buried.

== Overview ==
The Kurozuka Kofun is a zenpō-kōen-fun (前方後円墳), which is shaped like a keyhole, having one square end and one circular end, when viewed from above. It belongs to the Yanagimoto Kofun Group in the southeastern part of the Nara Basin, and is orientated to the west. The tumulus has a total length of about 130 meters. The posterior circular mound has a diameter about 72 meters and height of about 11 meters and is constructed in three tiers. The anterior rectangular portion has a length of about 48 meters, height of 6 meters and is constructed in two tiers. A slight arc-shaped bulge can be seen in the front of the front circular mound, indicating that it is shaped like a drumstick. These are characteristics of early Kofun period. The tumulus has a moat. No traces of fukiishi or haniwa have been found.

During an archaeological excavation conducted by the Kashihara Archaeological Institute of Nara Prefecture from 1997 to 1998, 33 triangular-rimmed "god and beast" bronze mirrors and one slightly older "god and beast" bronze mirror with a painted and written belt were discovered in situ. The mirrors and other items were still in their original positions when they were buried, and the arrangement of the grave goods and their meanings became clear. In the northeast corner, an iron product of unknown purpose was leaning against the wall, consisting of two iron bars, one large and one small, bent into a U-shape. Between the two bars, there were several V-shaped iron pipes that had either attached or collapsed, and there was evidence that the large and small U-shaped iron bars had been connected to the pipes in a sawtooth pattern. A vermilion-painted wooden shield was leaning against the north side of the wooden coffin, facing north, as is common in early Kinai region burial mounds.The north mirror outside the coffin is thought to have been placed on top of the shield. A group of arrowheads were found near the north end of the western side of the wooden coffin, with the tips facing south. It is believed that originally there was a bundle of arrow shafts in the gap. To the south of this, eleven swords, swords, and spears were placed together. Inside the coffin, a "picture-and-text belted divine beast" bronze mirror was placed at the head of the deceased, and one sword and one sword were placed on either side. Outside the wooden coffin, 15 triangular-rimmed "divine beast" bronze mirrors were placed on the east wall and 17 triangular-rimmed "divine beast" bronze mirrors were placed on the west wall with the mirrors facing inward, in the small space between the wooden coffin and the wall. The upper half of the deceased was surrounded by mirrors and swords in a U-shape, both inside and outside the coffin, and this arrangement is thought to have ritual significance. In addition, on the south side of the outside of the coffin, a large number of about 600 small metal plates, which are thought to have been a coat of plates stomach bound with leather, axes and spear tools, and Haji ware pottery, were placed. No jewels or arm ornaments were found.

The burial chamber in the posterior circular mound is a vertical stone chamber with an internal length of about 8.3 meters, a northern entrance width of 0.9 meters, and a height of about 1.7 meters. The ceiling is in a gassho-zukuri style, and is made of slabs of stone from Kasugayama and Shibayama at the foot of Mount Nijō. Inside the stone chamber, a clay coffin floor was set up, and a hollowed-out wooden coffin with a semicircular cross section and a total length of more than one meter was placed inside. The wooden coffin was painted with vermilion only in the central area, 2.8 meters long, and both ends were painted red with bengala.

In an earthquake thought to have occurred in the Kamakura period, the ceiling collapsed into the burial chamber, and the floor was covered with slabs of stone. In the center of the posterior circular mound, there was a large-scale excavation pit from the Kamakura period that led to the burial chamber, destroying a portion of it. However, as the chamber was largely was blocked by a large amount of fallen stones, and the grave robbers only entered the southern end. The grave goods were left intact except at the southern end of the burial chamber.In the late Muromachi period, the Yanagimoto clan used the Kurozuka Kofun to build a fortification, but later fell into disuse. In 1575, it was again fortified, this time by Matsunaga Hisahide, who built Yanagimoto Castle. After he rebelled against Oda Nobunaga and was killed, Yanagimoto Domain became the fief of Nobunaga's younger brother, Oda Nagamasu. During the Kan'ei era (1624–1643), Yanagimoto Jin'ya was built on the site of Yanagimoto Castle and was used by the Oda clan as the Yanagimoto Domain's headquarters until the end of the Edo period. As the Kurozuka Kofun was incorporated into the jin'ya, the moat was repurposed and stone walls were constructed. The tumulus was modified, with a rectangular central bailey built at the top of the circular mound, and several flat enclosures were carved into the mound toward the front, forming a terraced area. A narrow, flat, curved wall was built to surround the rear mound, and a new moat measuring 6.8 meters wide and 3.4 meters deep was excavated at the lowest point of the front mound to function as a fortress. From the Sengoku period to the Meiji period, access to the tumulus was thus highly restricted, and this prevented subsequent grave robbing.

Archaeologist Taichiro Shiraishi has developed a chronological classification dating system for triangular-rimmed "god-beast" bronze mirrors, dividing by design into stages I to V. Per this system only stages I to III have been excavated from this tomb, and no stage IV or later has been excavated, so it is highly likely that the tumulus was built around 260 AD.

Since the Meiji period, most of the former jin'ya site has been the site of Tenri City Yanagimoto Elementary School, and the tomb has been developed by Tenri City to become Yanagimoto Park. Adjacent to the tomb is the Tenri City Kurozuka Tomb Exhibition Hall, which displays a life-size model of the burial chamber and replicas of bronze mirrors. The excavated items were designated a National Important Cultural Property in 2004, and are owned by the Kashihara Archaeological Institute.

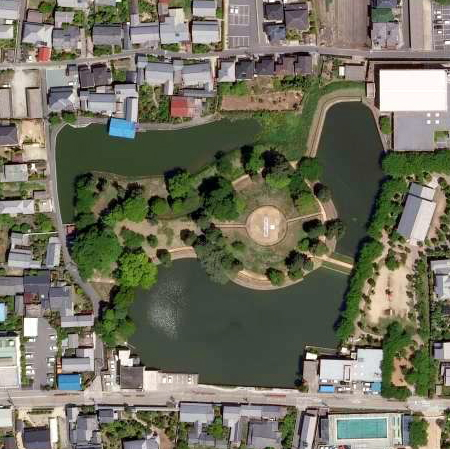
Aerial view

The site is about a five-minute walk from Yanagimoto Station on the JR West Sakurai Line.

== See also ==
- List of Historic Sites of Japan (Nara)
