= Tenri =

Tenri 天理市
- City
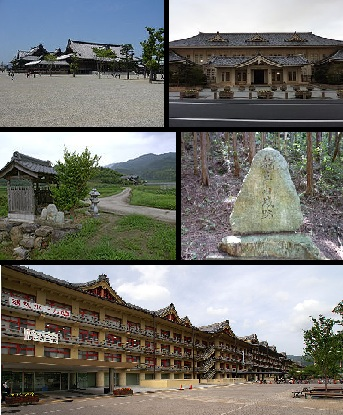
- Top left: View of Headquarter in Tenri religious community, Top right: Tenri religious school, Middle left: View of a point of side of mount Miwa road, Middle right: Stone site in Ryuo Mount Castle, Bottom: Tenri Reference Museum

- Flag Seal
- Location of Tenri in Nara Prefecture

- Location in Japan
- Coordinates: 34°35′48″N 135°50′14″E
- Country: Japan
- Region: Kansai
- Prefecture: Nara

Government
  - Mayor: Keisaku Minami

Area
  - Total: 86.42 km^{2} (33.37 sq mi)

Population (September 30, 2024)
  - Total: 60,890
  - Density: 704.6/km^{2} (1,825/sq mi)
- Time zone: UTC+09:00 (JST)
- City hall address: 605 Kawaharajō-chō, Tenri-shi, Nara-ken
- Website: Official website
- Symbols
- Flower: Ume
- Tree: Ginkgo

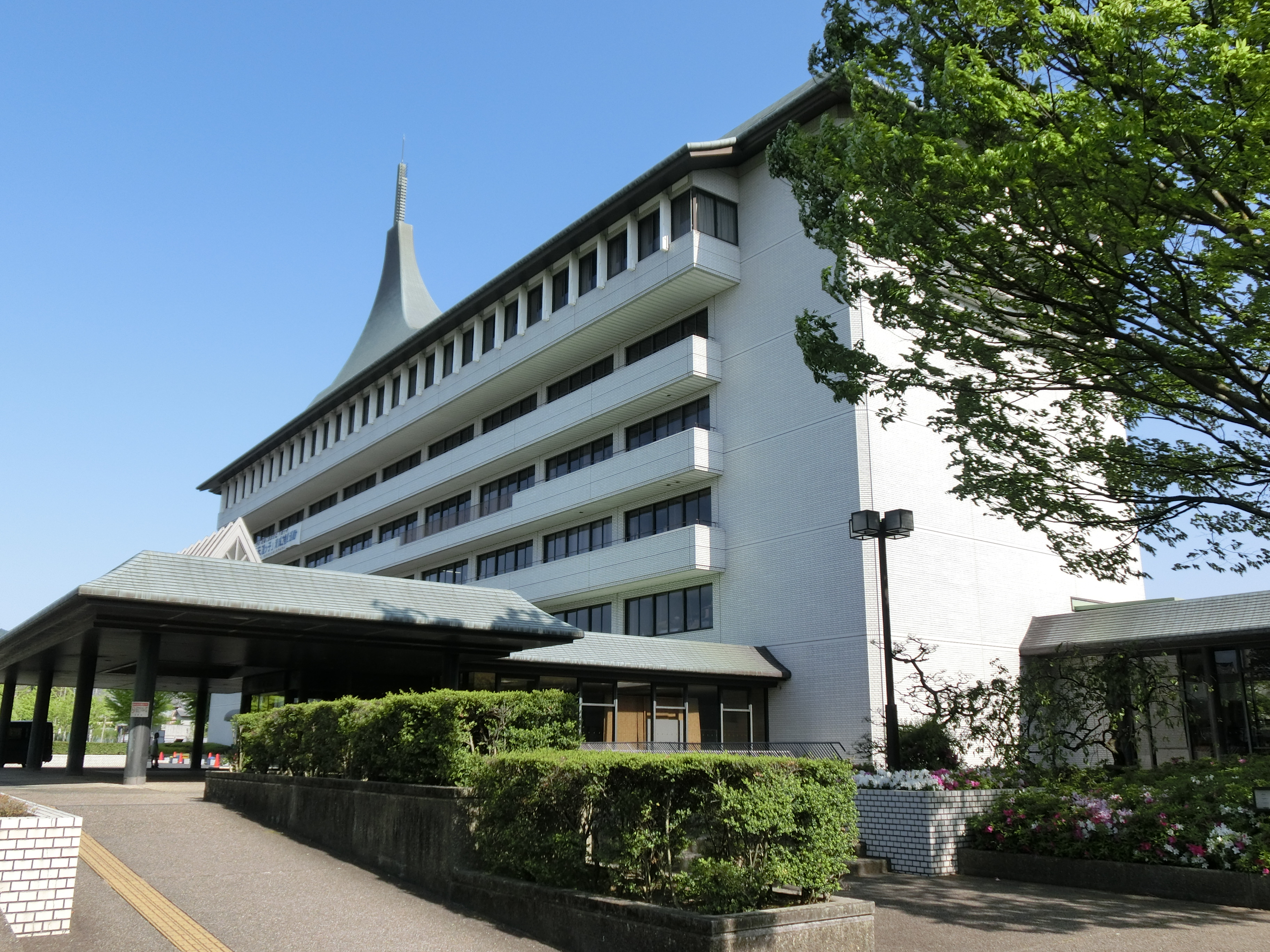
Tenri City Hall

Tenri (天理市, Tenri-shi) is a city located in Nara Prefecture, Japan. As of 30 September 2024, the city had an estimated population of 60,890 in 29456 households, and a population density of 700 persons per km^{2}. The total area of the city is 86.42 km^{2} (33.37 sq mi). The city is named after the Japanese new religion Tenrikyo, which has its headquarters in the city.

== Geography ==
Tenri is located in the north-central part of Nara Prefecture.

=== Neighboring municipalities ===
Nara Prefecture

- Nara
- Sakurai
- Yamatokōriyama
- Tawaramoto
- Miyake
- Kawanishi

=== Climate ===
Tenri has a humid subtropical climate (Köppen Cfa) characterized by warm summers and cool winters with light to no snowfall. The average annual temperature in Tenri is 13.4 °C. The average annual rainfall is 1636 mm with September as the wettest month. The temperatures are highest on average in August, at around 25.4 °C, and lowest in January, at around 1.9 °C.

=== Demographics ===
Per Japanese census data, the population of Tenri is as shown below

Historical population
Year	Pop.	±%
1960	50,438	—
1970	57,020	+13.0%
1980	64,894	+13.8%
1990	68,815	+6.0%
2000	72,741	+5.7%
2010	69,178	−4.9%
2020	63,889	−7.6%

== History ==
The area of Tenri is part of ancient Yamato Province. Tenri was briefly the capital of Japan during the reign of Emperor Ninken. The life of the Imperial court was centered at Isonokami Hirotaka Palace where the emperor lived in 488–498.

The village of Yamanobe was established on April 1, 1889 with the creation of the modern municipalities system. It was raised to town status on September 26, 1893 and renamed Tambaichi (丹波市町). On April 1, 1954, Tambaichi merged with the villages of Asawa, Fukuzumi, and Nikaido and the towns of Ichinomoto and Yanagimoto to form the city of Tenri.

=== Relations with Tenrikyo ===
About a quarter of the city's residents are believed to be affiliated with the Tenrikyo religion, and the remaining residents are thought to include several thousand students belonging to Tenrikyo-affiliated educational institutions.

Since almost half of the city area is occupied by non-taxable religious facilities related to Tenrikyo, the city has faced a problem of reduced revenue from property taxes, etc. To compensate for this, the religious organization has been making large donations to Tenri City since 1967. The amount of the donation is close to the total local tax revenue of Tenri City. The amount of the donation is decided in consultation between Tenri City and the religious organization when the annual budget is compiled, depending on the content of the city planning projects for that year. In addition, donations tend to increase sharply in years close to the Tenrikyo Founder's Festival, which is held every 10 years. Thus, Tenri City cannot survive as a municipality without a relationship with the religious organization. While the city emphasizes its development as a city integrated with the sect, the Tenrikyo Church Headquarters has a policy of not fielding candidates in mayoral and city council elections.

== Government ==
Tenri has a mayor-council form of government with a directly elected mayor and a unicameral city council of 16 members. Tenri contributes two members to the Nara Prefectural Assembly. In terms of national politics, the city is part of the Nara 2nd district of the lower house of the Diet of Japan.

== Economy ==
There are many Tenrikyo-related facilities in the city center, giving it the appearance of a religious city, but the city as a whole is an agricultural area. Strawberry cultivation is particularly popular. Industrial activities center on semiconductors and light manufacturing. Due to its location on major east-west highways, the city is increasing becoming a commuter town for the great Osaka metropolis.

== Education ==
Tenri has nine public elementary schools and five public junior high schools operated by the city government and two public high schools operated by the Nara Prefectural Board of Education. There is also one private elementary school junior high schools and one private high school.

Tenri University and Tenri Health Care University, both private universities are located in the city.

== Transportation ==
=== Railways ===
JR West - Sakurai Line (Manyō-Mahoroba Line)

U Ichinomoto - Tenri - Nagara - Yanagimoto

Kintetsu Railway - Tenri Line

Nikaidō - Senzai - Tenri

=== Highways ===
- Nishi-Meihan Expressway
- Keinawa Expressway
- National Route 24
- National Route 25
- National Route 169

== Sister cities ==
- Bauru, Brazil, since April 1940
- La Serena, Chile, since October 1966
- Seosan, South Korea, since November 1991

== Local attractions ==
=== Shrines and temples ===
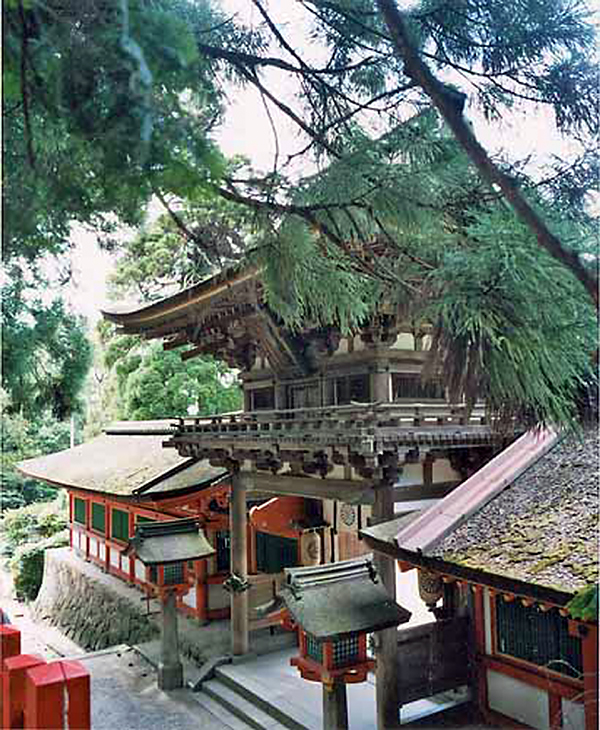
Gate of Isonokami Jingu

- Isonokami Shrine
- Ōyamato Shrine
- Chōgaku-ji

=== Tenrikyo ===
- Tenrikyo Church Headquarters

=== National Historic Sites ===
- Akatsuchiyama Kofun
- Kushiyama Kofun
- Kurozuka Kofun
- Nishiyama Kofun

== Notable people from Tenri ==
- So Yamamura, actor and director
- Sanae Takaichi, 104th Prime Minister of Japan
