= Minamihokke-ji =

Buddhist temple in Takatori, Nara, Japan

Minami Hokke-ji (Tsubosaka-dera)
- 南法華寺（壺阪寺）
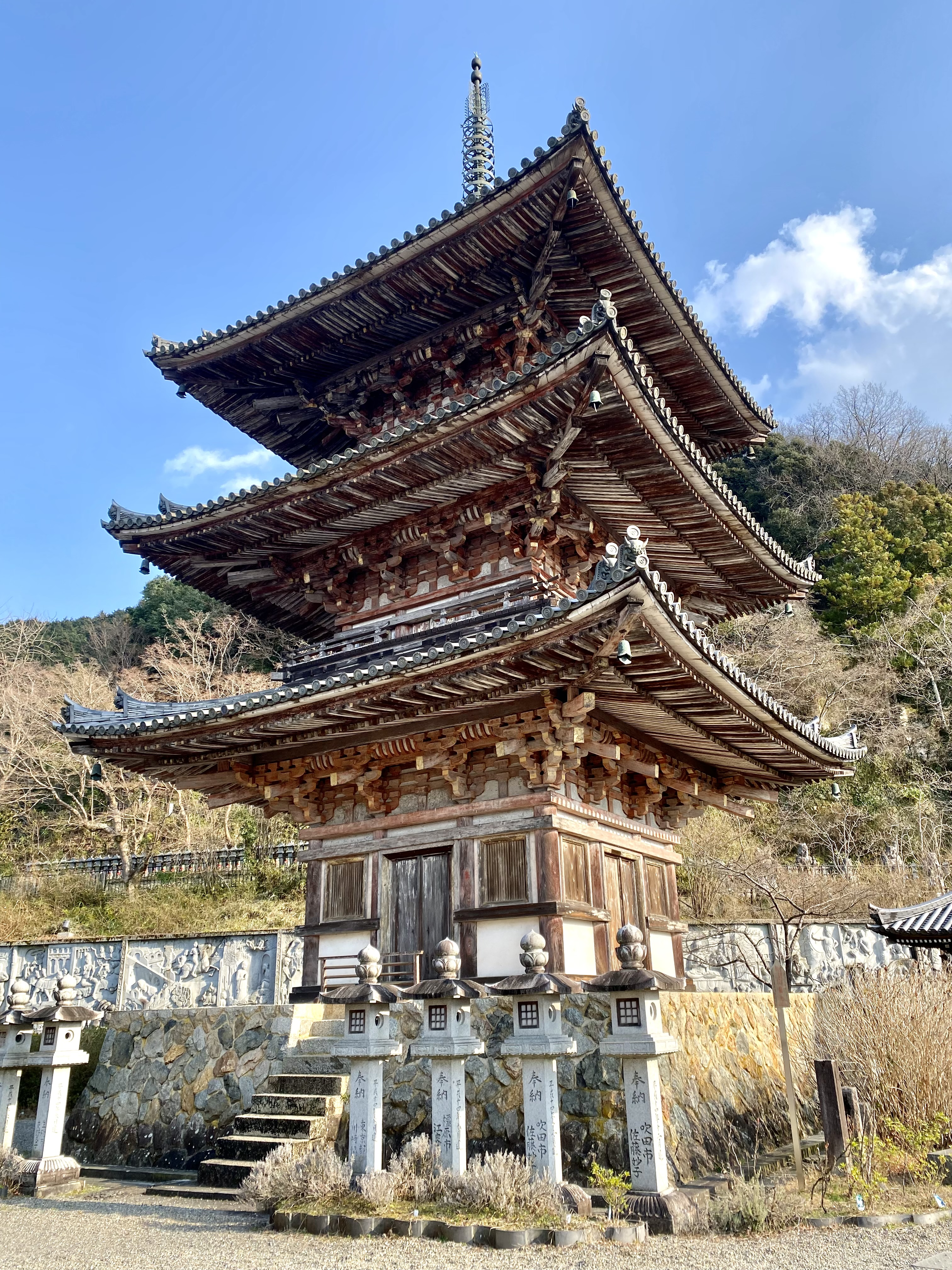
- Minami Hokke-ji Pagoda

- Location within Nara Prefecture Location within Japan

Religion
- Affiliation: Buddhist
- Deity: Jūichimen Senjū Kannon
- Rite: Shingon
- Status: functional

Location
- Location: 3 Tsubosaka,Takatori-cho, Takaichi-gun, Nara-ken
- Interactive map of Minami Hokke-ji (Tsubosaka-dera)
- Coordinates: 34°25′35.6″N 135°48′37″E

Architecture
- Founder: c. Benki
- Completed: c.703

Website
- Official website

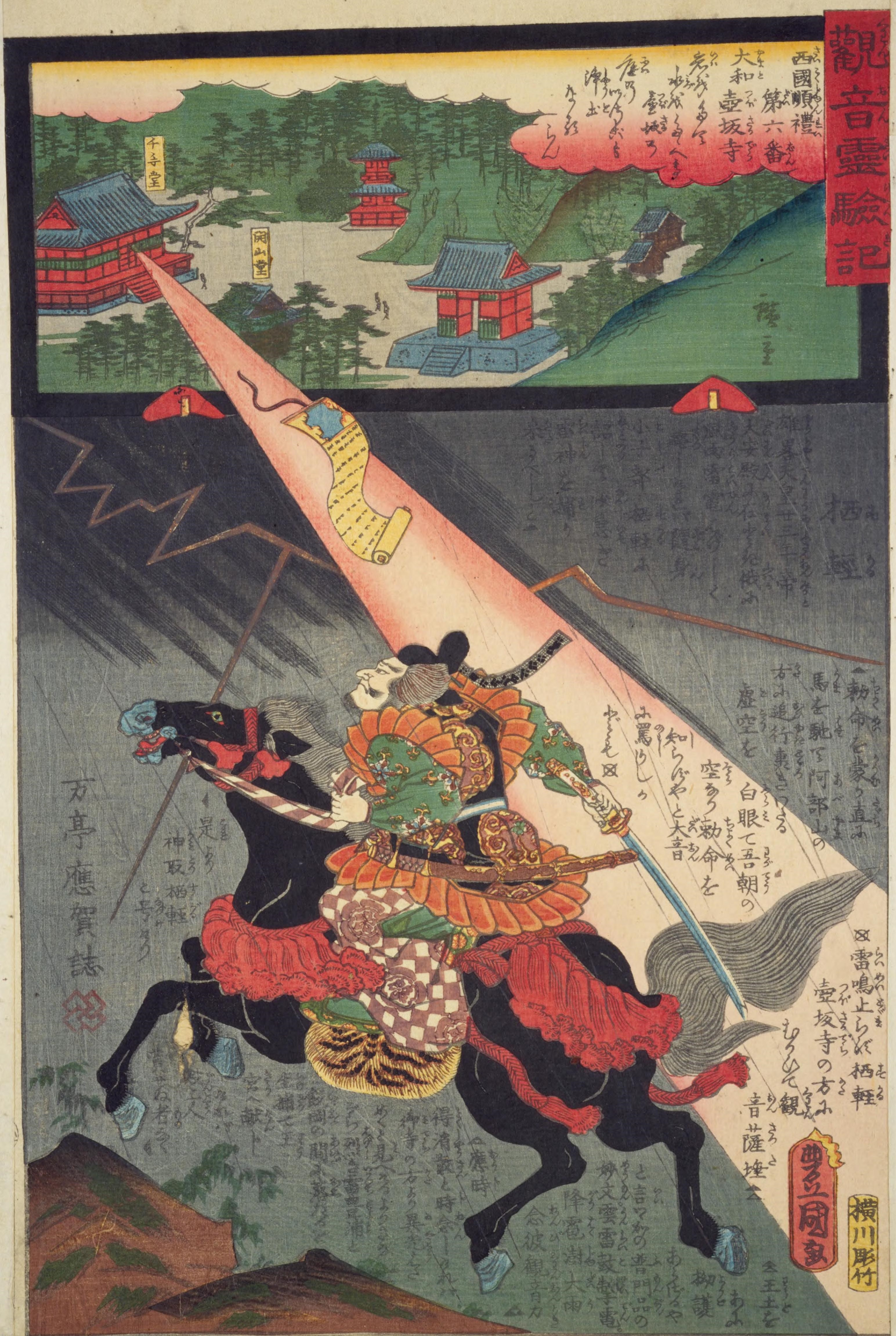
from the picture album "Kannon Reigen ki"

Minami Hokke-ji (南法華寺) is a Buddhist temple located in the Tsubosaka neighborhood of the town of Takatori, Nara Prefecture Japan. It belongs to the Shingon sect of Japanese Buddhism and its honzon (primary image) is a statue of Jūichimen Senjū Kannon. The temple's full name is Tsubosaka-san Minami-Hokke-ji (壺阪山 南法華寺), but it is more commonly known as "Tsubosaka-dera" (壺阪寺). The temple is the 6th stop on the 33 temple Saigoku Kannon Pilgrimage route.

== History ==
Much about the temple's founding remains unknown. According to the temple's "Minami-Hokke-ji Kōrōden” history, the monk Benki of Gangō-ji in Heijō-kyō, founded the temple in 703. Benki, while practicing asceticism on the mountain, reportedly placed a crystal jar in a hermitage at the top of the hill and enshrined a Kannon statue. It later became a prayer temple for Empress Genshō.

During the Heian period, while Heian-kyō's Kiyomizu-dera was still called Kita-Hokke-ji (北法華寺), this temple was called Minami-Hokke-ji (南法華寺). Along with Hase-dera, it has long flourished as a sacred site for the worship of Kannon. In 847, it was listed as a Jogaku-ji temple (a private temple within the Ritsuryō system that received treatment from the Imperial Court equivalent to official temples), along with Hase-dera.

The principal image of the temple, the Jūchimen Senjō Kannon, was believed to have miraculous powers for treating eye diseases, causing the temple to be a major pilgrimage distination. Worship by aristocrats was also common, and in Chapter 194 of Sei Shōnagon's "The Pillow Book," it is listed alongside Mount Koya, Ishiyama-dera, Hōrin-ji, and Kokawa-dera as a top temple for miracles.

In 1007, Sadaijin Fujiwara no Michinaga stayed at the temple on his way to Yoshino for a pilgrimage. At its peak, the temple had 36 halls and over 60 temple buildings, but a fire in 1096 destroyed most of it. Later, it was rebuilt as a major training center for the Kojima School (Tsubosaka School) of Shingon Buddhism.

In 1211, the temple suffered damage to its main gate and monks' quarters, and suffered several other fires. It was also embroiled in wars during the Sengoku period. With the demise of the Ochi clan, which had been its patron, the temple fell into decline, with only the Muromachi period prayer hall and three-story pagoda remaining.

During the Keichō era (1596–1615), Honda Toshimasa, a vassal of Toyotomi Hidenaga and lord of Takatori Castle, dedicated himself to the restoration of the temple's buildings.

During the Edo period, the temple flourished under the patronage of the Uemura clan, daimyō of Takatori Domain, and became famous as the setting for the puppet theater play "Tsubosaka Miracle Chronicles," (壺坂霊験記) which tells the story of the love between the married couple Osato and Sawaichi.

The temple's Main Hall is unusually an Octagonal Hall. Rebuilt in the Edo period, it may have been the first octagonal hall to have been built in Japan.

Because of its association with miraculous cures for eye diseases, Japan's first nursing home for the blind, "Jiboen," was built at the temple in 1961. The nursing home was relocated to Takatori Town in June 2021, and the former nursing home site is now a parking lot.

== Images of the temple ==
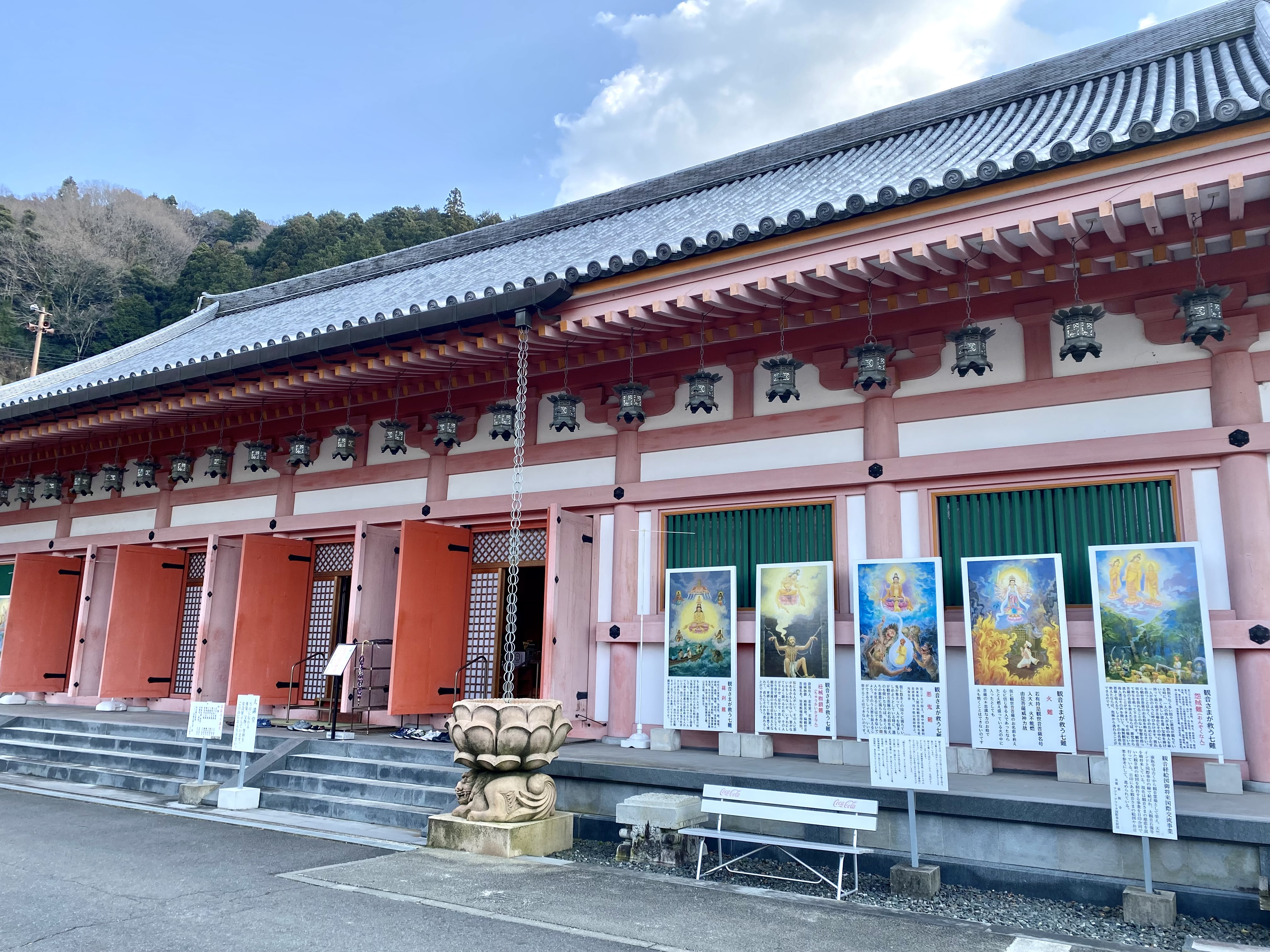
Daikōdō

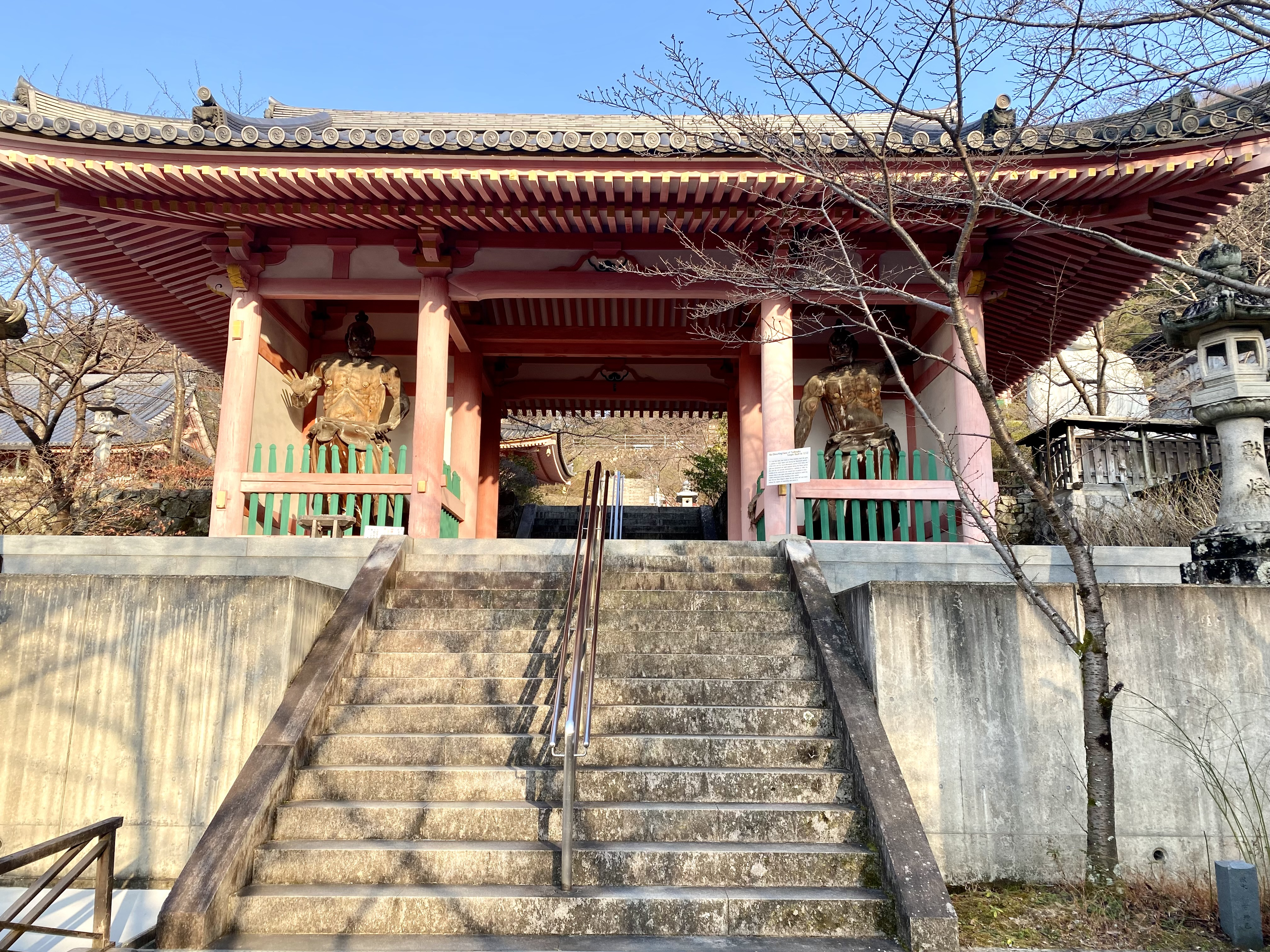
Niōmon

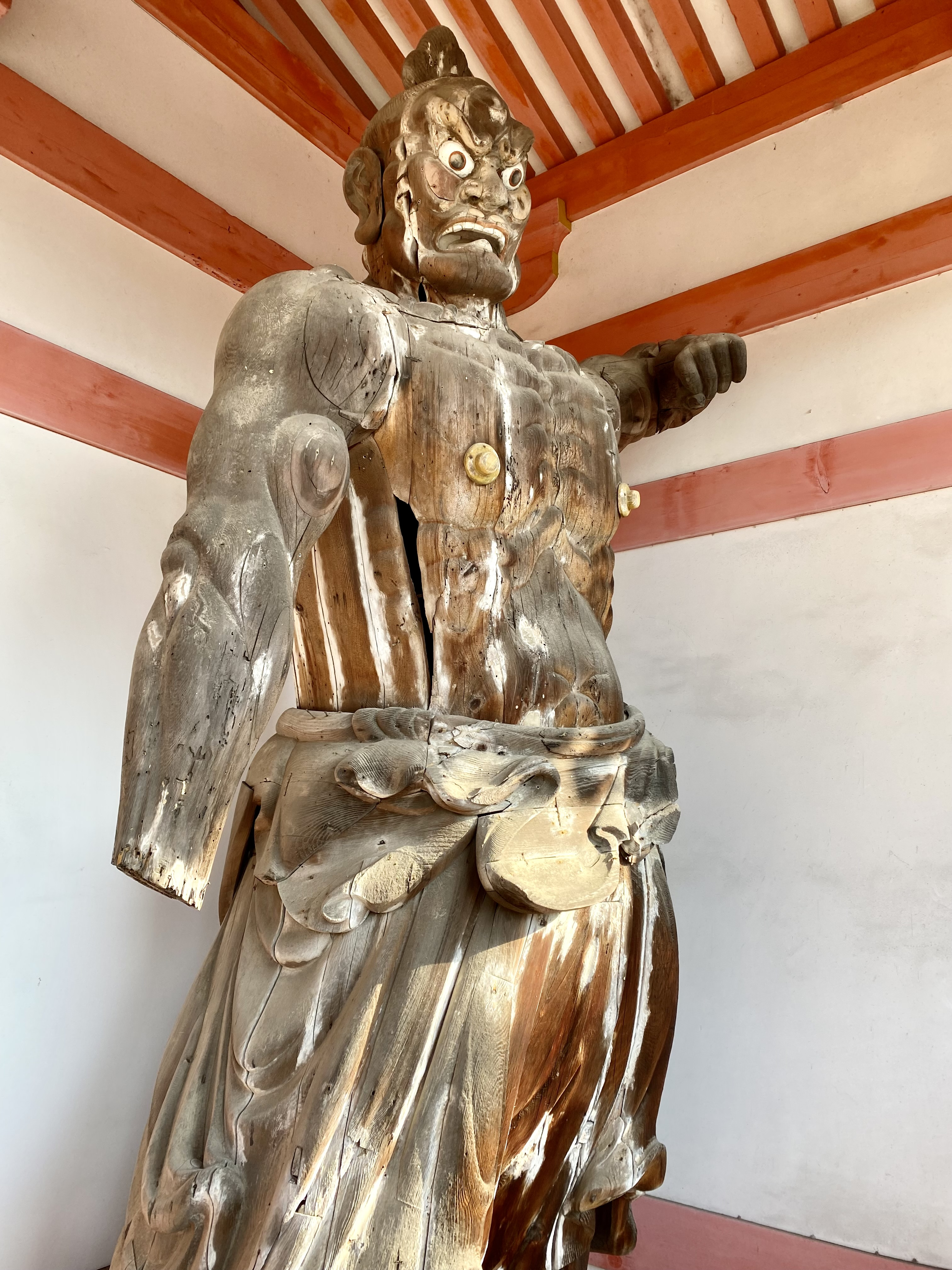
Niō

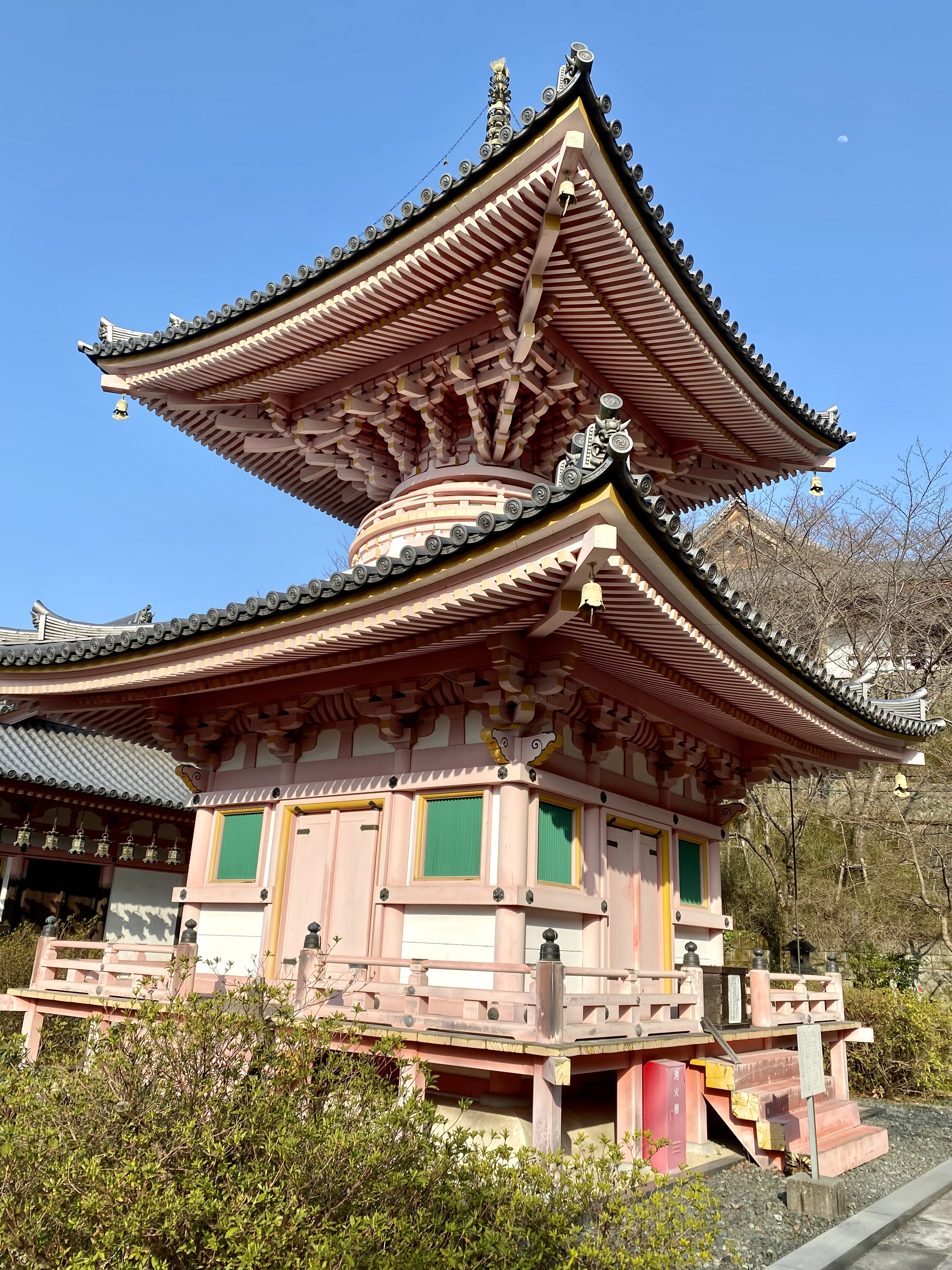
Tahōtō

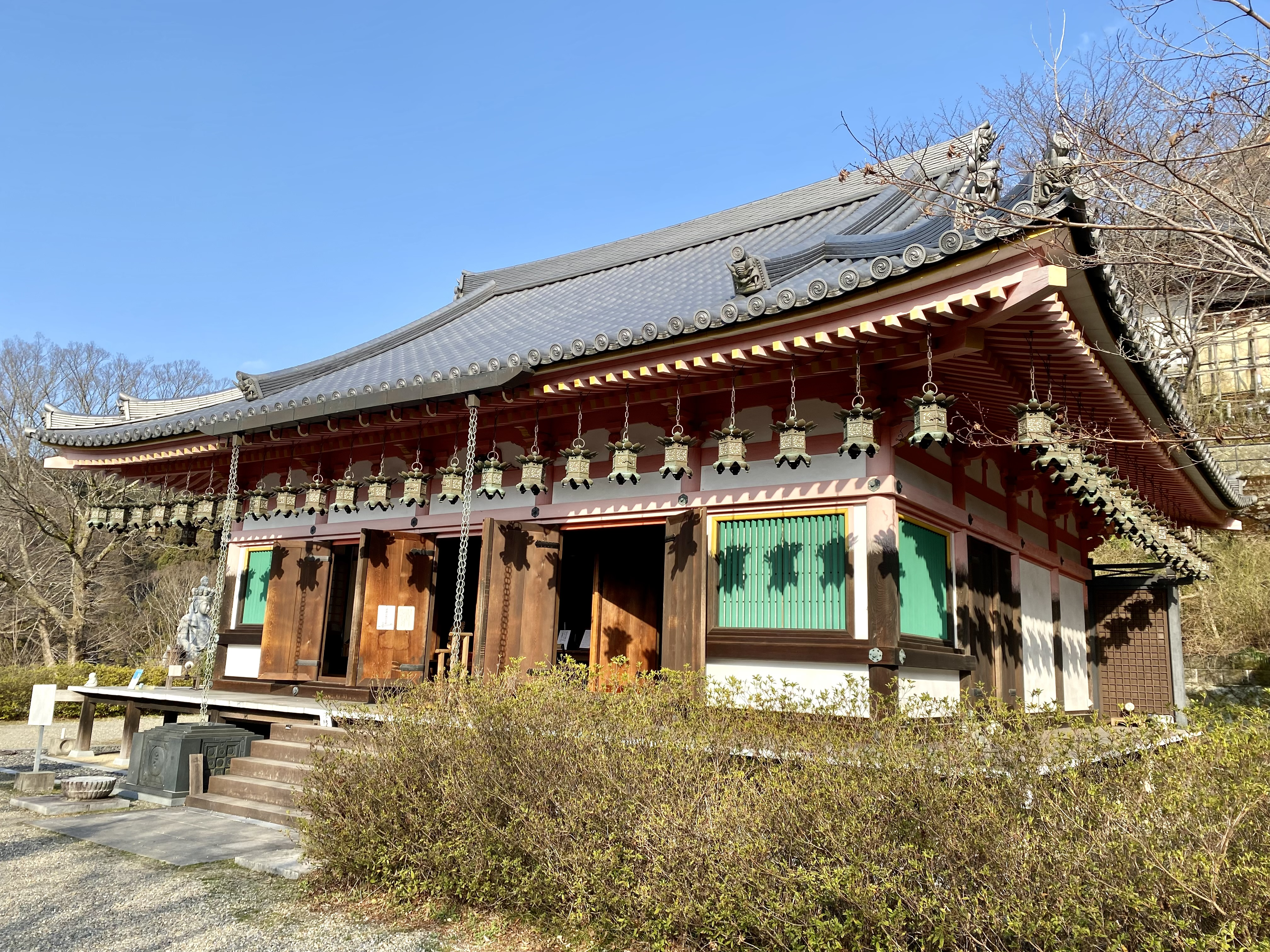
Kanchō-dō

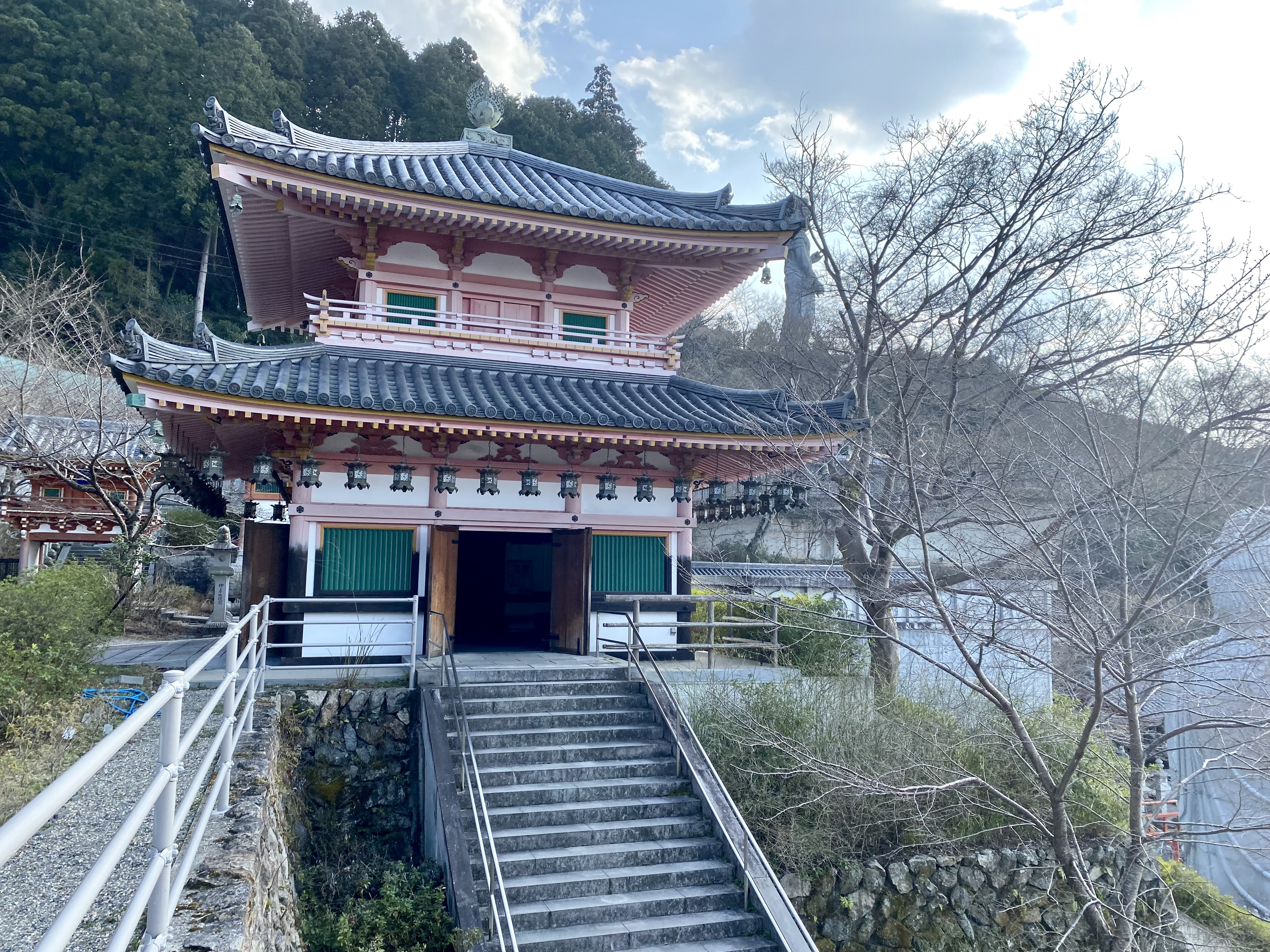
Jigan-dō

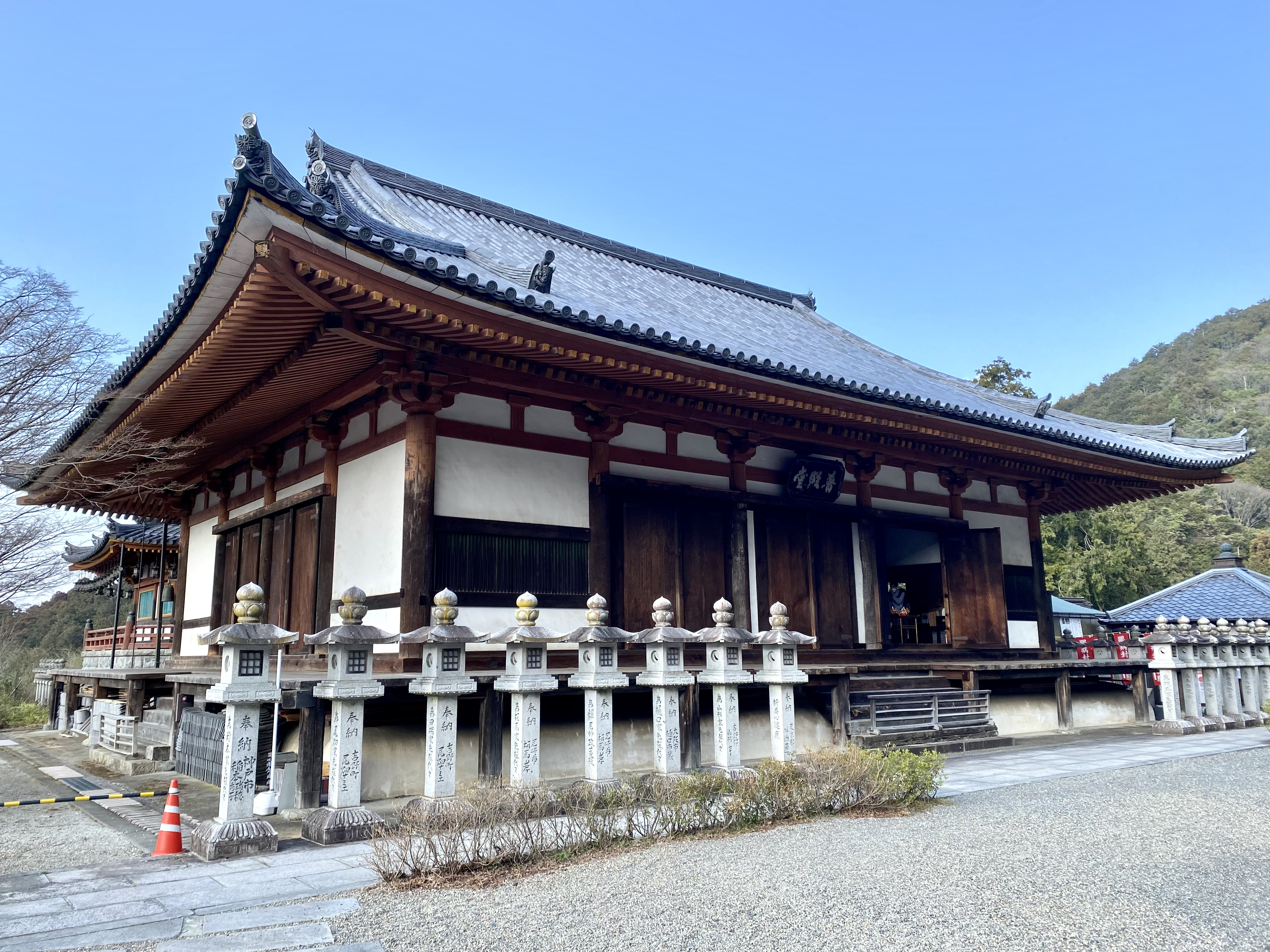
Raidō

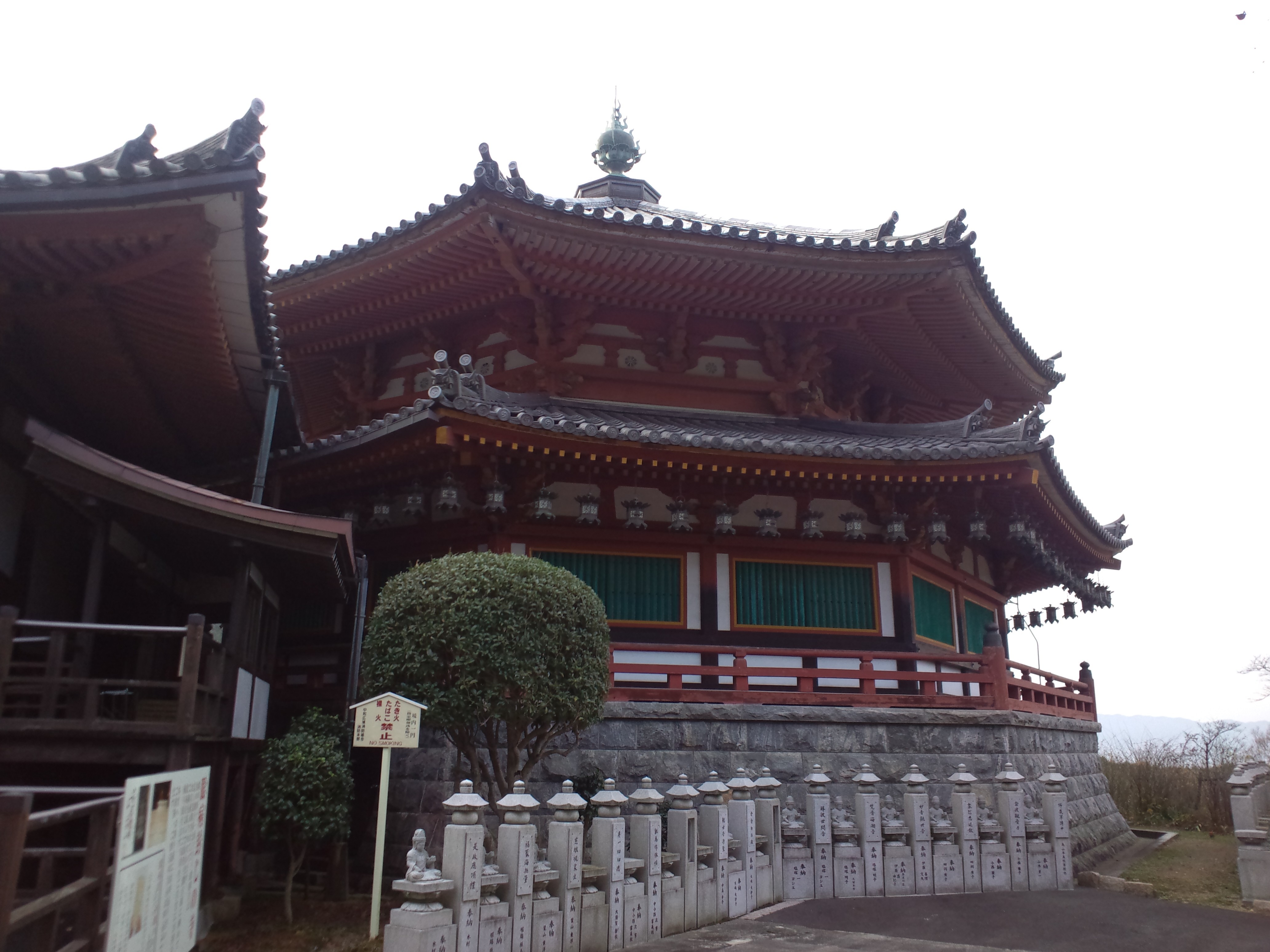
Octagonal Hall（Hondō）

== Access ==
The temple is accessible by Nara Kotsu Bus Lines Route 20 from Tsubosakayama Station on the Kintetsu Yoshino Line.

== Cultural Properties ==
=== National Important Cultural Properties ===
- Raidō (礼堂), Mid-Muromachi period (1393–1466);
- Three-story Pagoda (三重塔), late-Muromachi period (1497);
- Colored single-character golden ring mandala on silk (絹本著色一字金輪曼荼羅図), Kamakura period; Kept at Nara National Museum
