= Uemura =

Uemura (上村 characters for "Top" and "Village" or 植村 characters for "plants in place" and "Village") is a Japanese surname. It can refer to:

- Uemura Bunrakuken (植村文楽軒), originator of Bunraku
- Uemura Masahisa (植村正久), Christian pastor
- Uemura Shōen (植村松園), painter
- Aiko Uemura (上村愛子), mogul skier
- Ayako Uemura (上村彩子), voice actress
- Haruki Uemura (上村春樹), judoka
- Hiroyuki Uemura (上村洋行), jockey
- Iemasa Uemura (植村家政), Hatamoto and Hansyu
- Kana Uemura (植村花菜), Singer-songwriter
- Kazuhiro Uemura (上村和裕), baseball player
- Kei Uemura (植村慶), football player
- Kenichi Uemura (voice actor) (上村健一), Japanese actor and voice actor
- Kihatirou Uemura (植村喜八郎), baseball player
- Kōgorō Uemura (1894–1978), Japanese businessman
- Mai Uemura (上村麻衣), volleyball player
- Masayuki Uemura (上村雅之), game hardware designer
- Miki Uemura (上村 美揮, born 1986), Japanese artistic gymnast
- Naomi Uemura (植村直己), adventurer
- Noriko Uemura (上村典子), Japanese voice actress
- Shu Uemura (植村秀), make-up artist
- Takako Uemura (上村貴子), Japanese voice actress
- Tatsuya Uemura (上村建也), arcade game musician and programmer
- Yukihiko Uemura (上村 幸彦, born 1959), Japanese handball player
- Yusuke Uemura (植村祐介), baseball player

== See also ==
- Kamimura ‐上村 can also read Kamimura.
