= Iemasa =

- Gender: Male

Origin
- Origin: Japanese
- Meaning: Different meanings depending on the kanji used

Iemasa (written: 家政 or 家正) is a masculine Japanese given name. Notable people with the name include:

- Hachisuka Iemasa (蜂須賀 家政) (1558–1639), Japanese daimyō
- Iemasa Kayumi (家弓 家正) (1932–2014), Japanese voice actor and actor
- Tokugawa Iemasa (徳川 家正) (1884–1963), Japanese politician
- Uemura Iemasa (植村 家政) (1589–1650), Japanese daimyō
