= Ichio Miyazuka Kofun =

Kofun period burial mound in Japan

- 市尾宮塚古墳 (Japanese)
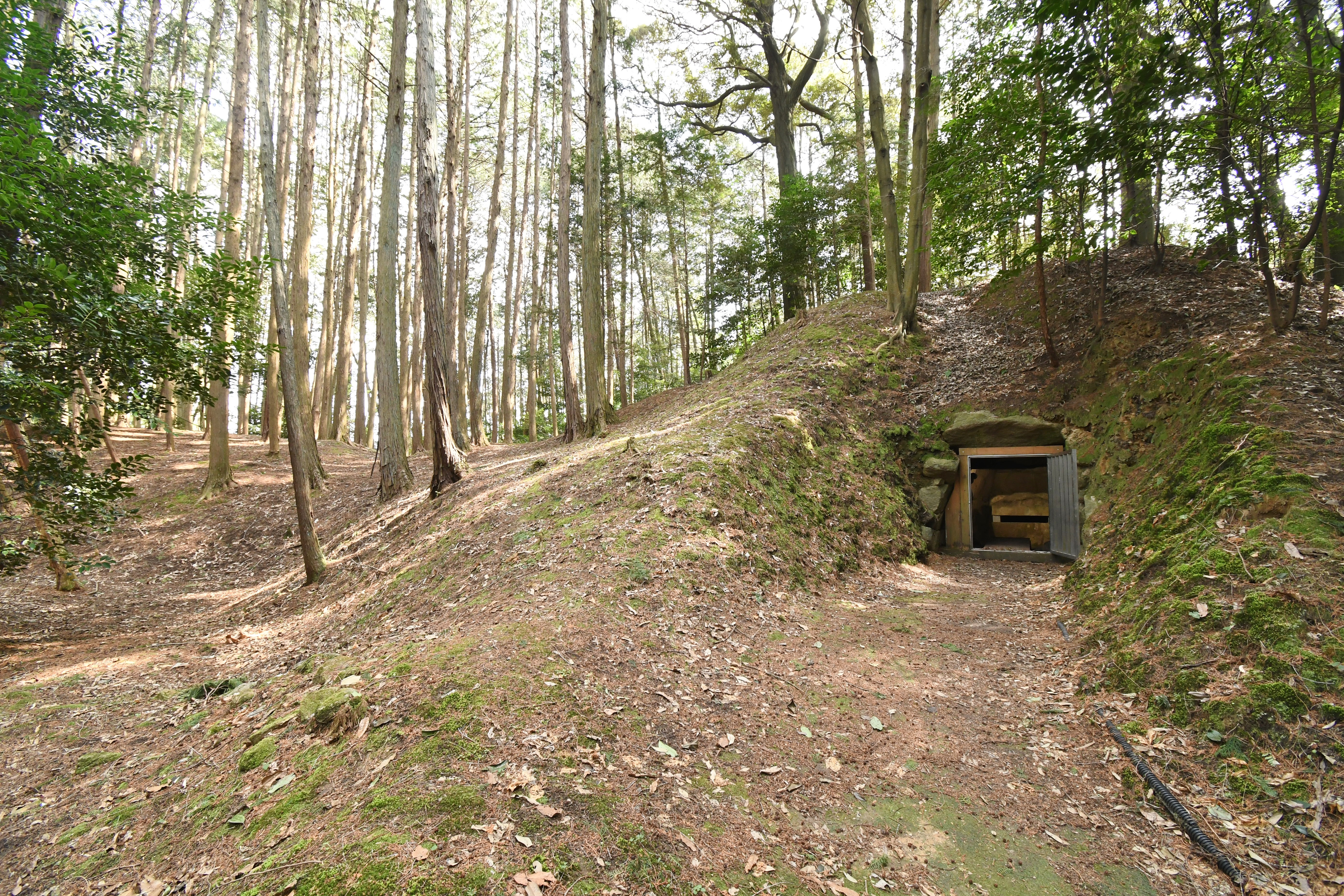
- Ichio Miyazuka Kofun

- Ichio Miyazuka Kofun Ichio Miyazuka Kofun (Japan)
- Interactive map of Ichio Miyazuka Kofun
- 34°26′33.32″N 135°46′19.83″E
- Type: Kofun
- Periods: Kofun period
- Location: Takatori, Nara, Japan
- Region: Kansai region

History
- Built: c.6th century

Site notes
- Public access: Yes (no facilities)

Ichio Miyazuka Kofun (市尾宮塚古墳) is a burial mound, located in the Ichiohaka neighborhood of the town of Takatori, Nara prefecture in the Kansai region of Japan. Together with the Ichiohakayama Kofun, the tumulus was designated a National Historic Site of Japan in 1981.

== Overview ==
The Ichio Miyazuka Kofun is a zenpō-kōen-fun (前方後円墳), which is shaped like a keyhole, having one square end and one circular end, when viewed from above. It is located at the southern edge of the Nara Basin, on an independent hill (106 meter elevation) across the from a ridge that extends north from the Ryumon Mountains. A Tenmangu Shrine is currently located on the hill, and Ichiohakayama Kofun is located to the northeast of the hill. Part of the tomb was excavated around 1893, and grave goods were unearthed. Modern archaeological excavations have been conducted since 1975. The tumulus is orientated to the northwest, with a total length of about 44 meters, with a 23 meter wide anterior rectangular portion, and 23 meter diameter posterior circular portion. The mound was built in two tiers. The burial chamber is a double-sided horizontal-hole stone chamber in the center of the circular portion, measuring 11.6 meters in length. It contained a hollowed-out house-shaped stone coffin made of tuff, as well as the remains of a wooden coffin from the time of the secondary burial. The exterior of the stone sarcophagus was painted with red pigment. Numerous grave goods, including a silver-decorated dragon-patterned twisted ring-headed iron sword, a gilt bronze-decorated ring-headed iron sword, accessories, including beads and other jewelry, horse equipment, and Sue ware pottery have been recovered. From these grave goods and the style of the mound, this kofun was constructed in the first half of the 6th century, during the late Kofun period, shortly after the Ichiohakayama Kofun. As important ruins such as the Mizudoro Kofun and the remains of the Kose temple pagoda are found in the surrounding area, this tumulus has been linked to the Kose clan, a powerful late Kofun period clan who ruled this area during this period and who were active in diplomacy and military affairs with the Korean Peninsula.

Currently, the site is open to the public after maintenance work has been completed, but access to the burial chamber is restricted. The tumulus is about a five-minute walk from Ichio Station on the Kintetsu Railway Yoshino Line.

== See also ==
- List of Historic Sites of Japan (Nara)
