= Takatori Castle =

- 高取城
- Takatori, Nara Prefecture, Japan
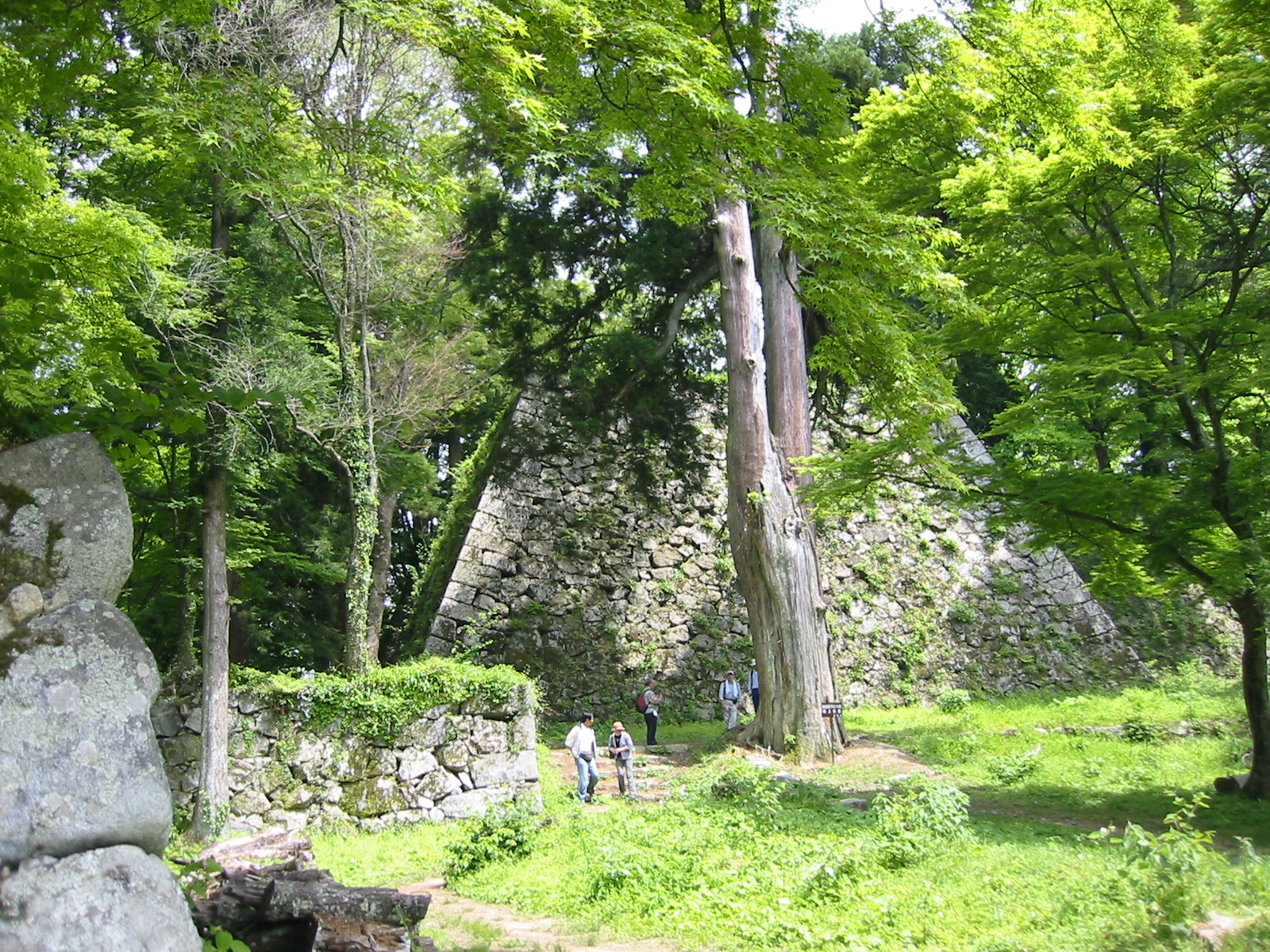
- Foundations of the tenshu of Takatori Castle

Site information
- Type: yamajiro-style Japanese castle
- Open to the public: yes
- Condition: ruins

Location
- Takatori Castle
- Location within Nara Prefecture Location within Japan
- Coordinates: 34°25′45.99″N 135°49′36.57″E

Site history
- Built: 1332
- Built by: Ochi clan, Honda clan
- In use: Nanboku-Edo period
- Demolished: 1873
- National Historic Site of Japan

Takatori Castle (高取城, Takatori jō) was a Sengoku to Edo period yamajiro-style Japanese castle located in what is now the town of Takatori, Nara Prefecture, in the Kinki region of Japan. Its ruins have been protected by the central government as a National Historic Site since 1953. Takatori Castle was listed as one of Japan's Top 100 Castles by the Japan Castle Foundation in 2006.

== Overview ==
Takatori Castle is a mountain castle built on Mount Takatori, 583 meters above sea level, about four kilometers southeast of the modern urban center of Takatori town. The castle was famous for its 29 white-plastered yagura turrets that are lined up on the mountain. When viewed from the castle town, the song "Tatsumi Takatori, if you look at it, it's not snow, Tosa's castle" was sung. Tōsa is the old name of Takatori. The castle consisted of a series of baileys, and the castle interior area covered about 10,000 square meters; the circumference of the fortifications extended for over three kilometers, and the total area of the entire castle was about 60,000 square meters, and the circumference was about 30 kilometers. It is the largest Sengoku period mountain castle, and it is counted as one of the three greatest mountain castles in Japan, along with Bitchū Matsuyama Castle (Okayama Prefecture) and Iwamura Castle (Gifu Prefecture). Despite the Tokugawa shogunate's edict of " One Castle per Province" in 1615, the castle was largely spared from destruction, and its stone walls and stone ramparts remain to this day.

== History ==
A fortification was first built on this location by Ochi Kunizumi in 1332. At the time, southern half of Nara basin was governed by Ochi clan, which was in constant conflict with the Tsutsui clan at north half of Nara basin for hegemony over Yamato Province. The Ochi supported the Southern Court in the wars of the Nanboku-chō period, and Takatori Castle was initially a subsidiary castle of Kaibukiyama Castle, the main stronghold of the Ochi. However, due to its size and strategic location, it gradually became the main stronghold by the Sengoku period. In June 1532, the Ikkō-ikki invaded Yamato Province and won a crushing victory over the armed monks of Kofuku-ji, whose remnants sought refuge at Takatori Castle. The castle was placed under siege, but the Ikkō-ikki were defeated by an army from the Tsutsui clan. In 1580, Oda Nobunaga secured control of Yamato Province and declared that all fortifications aside from Kōriyama Castle be destroyed. Takatori Castle was abandoned in 1580, but was reoccupied by Tsutsui Junkei after Nobunaga's death in 1584. In 1585, his heir Tsutsui Sadatsugu was transferred to Iga Province and Yamato Province came under the rule of Hideyoshi's brother, Toyotomi Hidenaga. Takatori Castle was initially occupied by Hidenaga's chief vassal, Wakisaka Yasuharu, but was later given to another chief vassal, Honda Toshihisa. In 1589, Toshihisa ordered his vassal, Moroki Daizen, to build a new castle. Toshihisa served Toyotomi Hideyasu, who became Hidenaga's successor when he died in 1591. After Hideyasu died at the age of 17 in 1595, Toshihisa's son, Honda Toshimasa, became Hideyoshi's direct vassal and was given a fief of 15,000 koku. Following Hideyoshi's death, Honda Toshimasa sided with Tokugawa Ieyasu. While serving with the Tokugawa forces in the campaign against Uesugi Kagekatsu, Takatori Castle was attacked by Ishida Mitsunari, but withstood the attack. After the 1600 Battle of Sekigahara, Honda Toshimasa was recognized for his contributions and was given an additional 10,000 koku, becoming the first daimyō of Takatori Domain with a kokudaka of 25,000 koku. However, Toshimasa's son Masatake died without an heir in 1637, bringing an end to the Honda clan's rule. In 1640, the hatamoto Uemura Iemasa was promoted to daimyō to revive Takatroi Domain, and the Uemura clan ruled the castle for 14 generations until the Meiji restoration. In the Bakumatsu period, the daimyō residence at the foot of the mountain was one of the places attacked in the Tenchūgumi incident.

Computer reconstruction of Takatori Castle tenshu

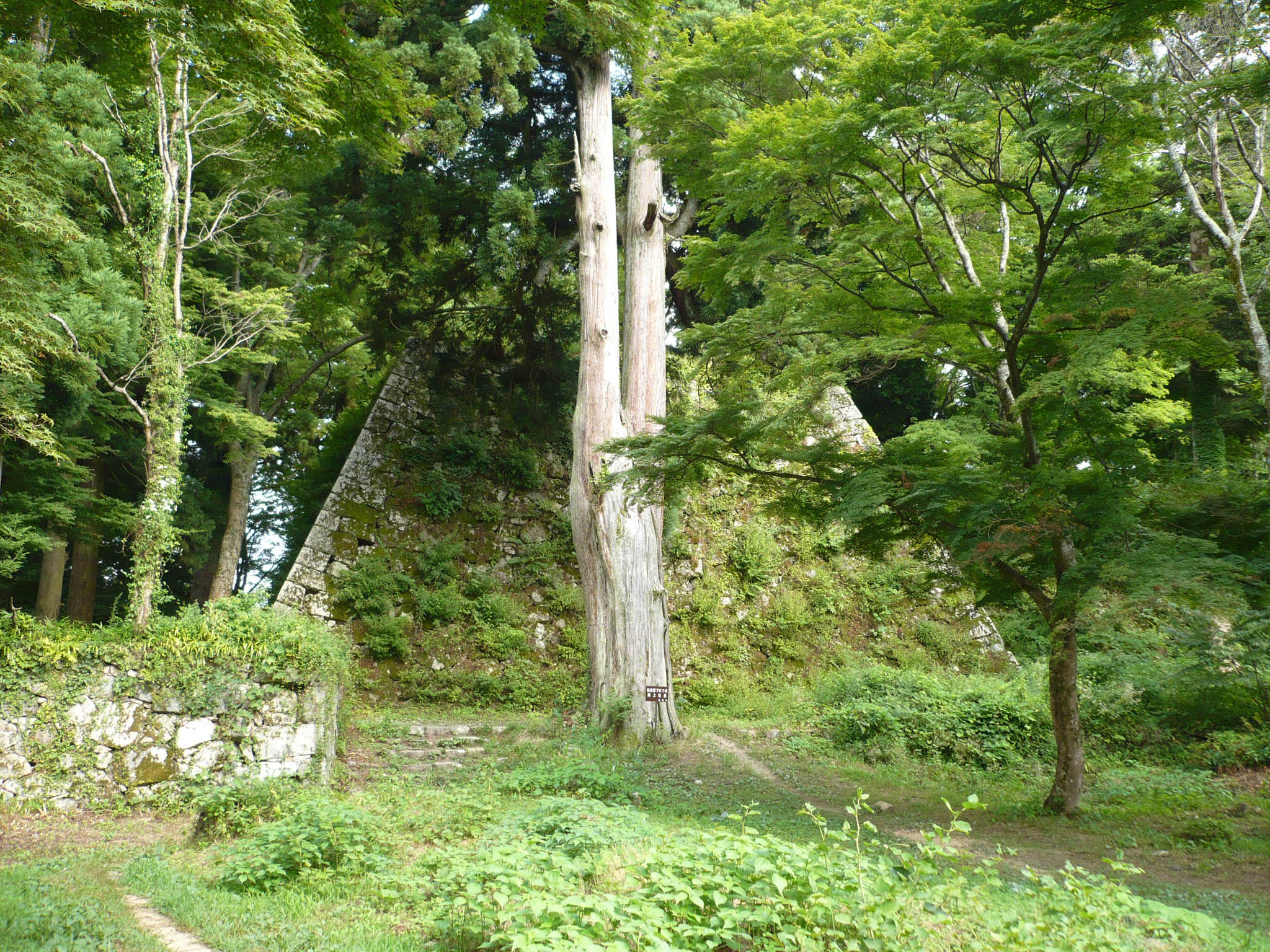
Foundations of the tenshu

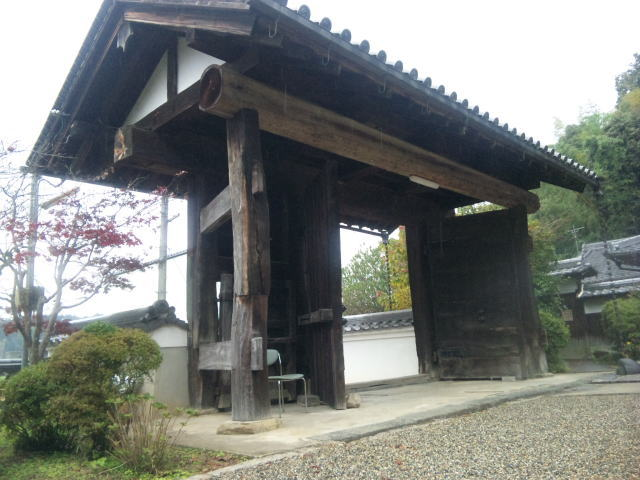
Ninomon Gate

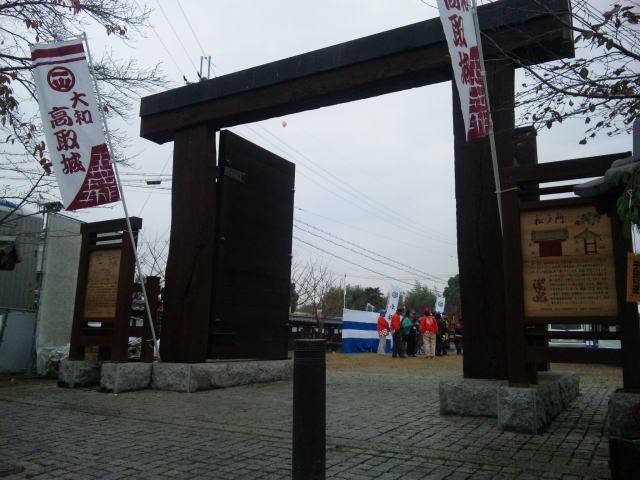
Matsunomon Gate

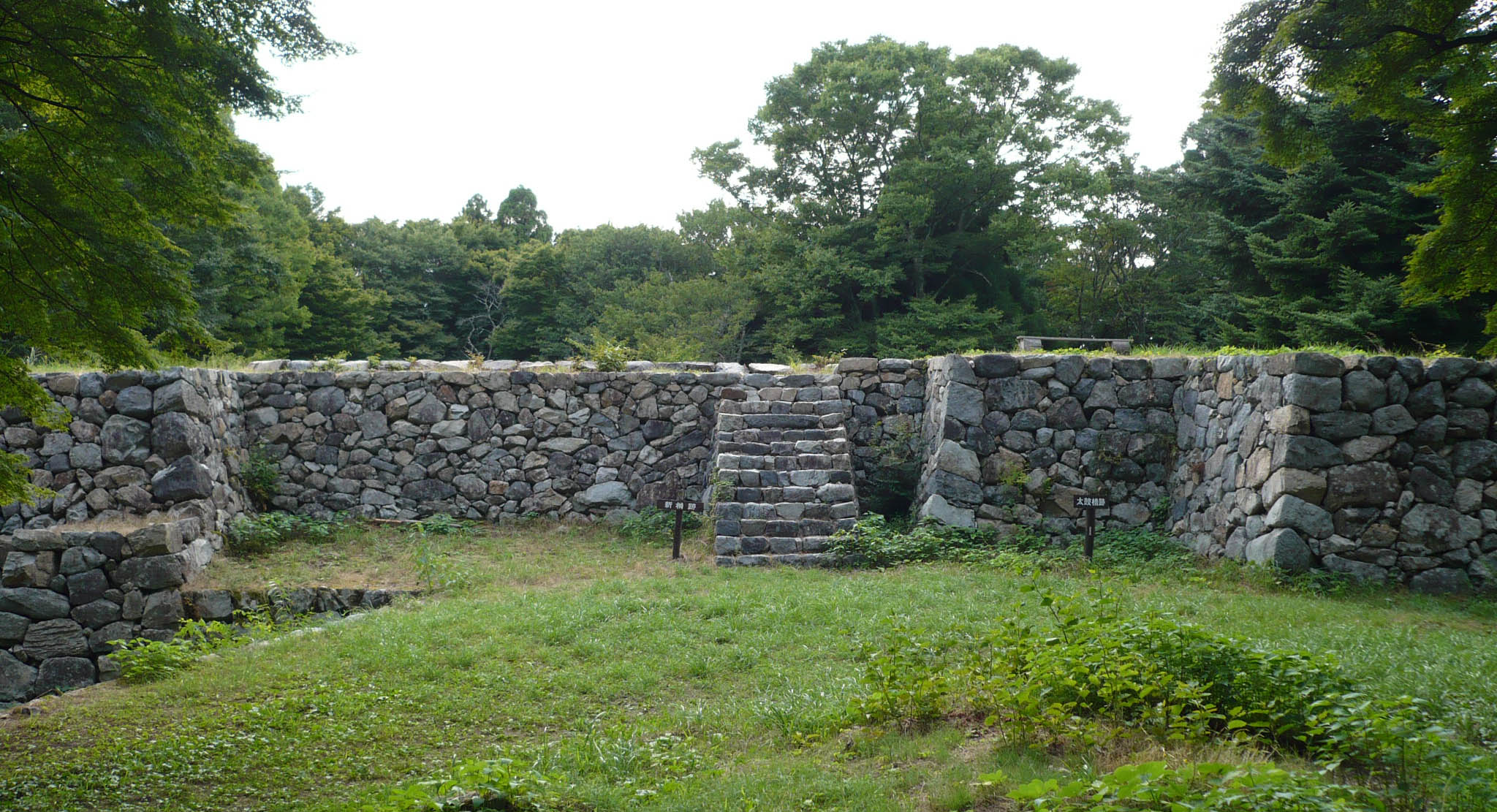
Surviving stone walls of Takatori Castle

== Current situation ==
The castle was abandoned in 1873, and many of the buildings, especially gates, were auctioned to nearby temples. Until around 1887, the main buildings, including the castle tower, remained within the castle, but since it was on the top of a mountain far from civilians, nothing was maintained and many collapsed naturally. The Ninomon Gate is now the sanmon to Kojima-dera temple in Takatori town; the front gate of the daimyō residence is the front gate of Ishikawa Clinic in town, and the Matsunomon Gate was moved to the Takatori Elementary School in 1892. After the school burned down in 1942, it was preserved by the Kongoriki Sake Brewery and in 2004 was restored as the front gate of a children's park. These are the only surviving structures of Takatori Castle. However, the remains of the stone walls on the mountain have remained in almost perfect condition without being disrupted by human activity.

The castle site is a 60-minute walk from the Kintetsu Railway Yoshino Line Tsubosakayama Station.

== See also ==
- List of Historic Sites of Japan (Nara)
