= Ichiohakayama Kofun =

Kofun period burial mound in Japan

- 市尾墓山古墳 (Japanese)
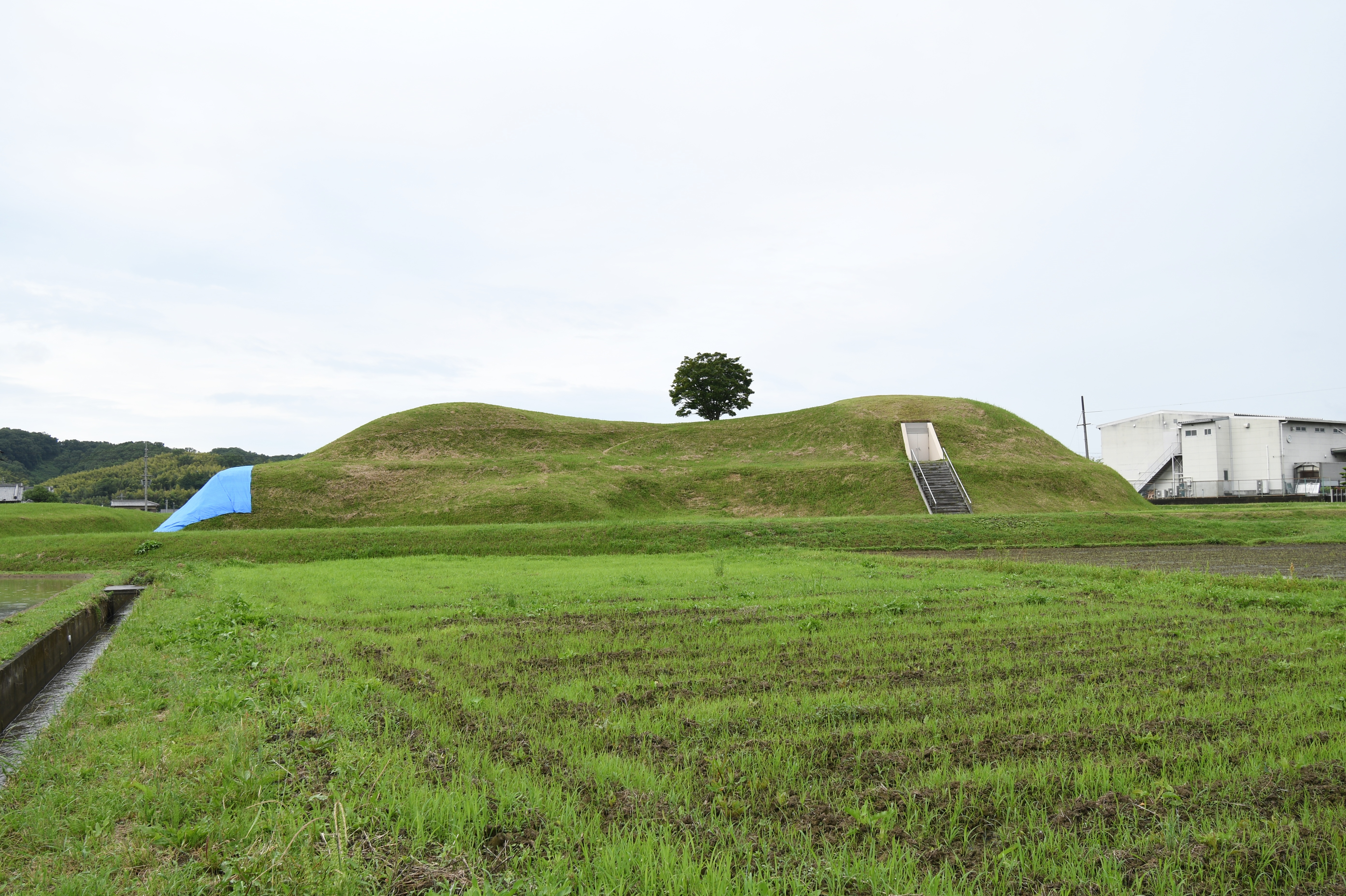
- Ichiohakayama Kofun

- Ichiohakayama Kofun Ichiohakayama Kofun (Japan)
- Interactive map of Ichiohakayama Kofun
- 34°26′37.85″N 135°46′28.4″E
- Type: Kofun
- Periods: Kofun period
- Location: Takatori, Nara, Japan
- Region: Kansai region

History
- Built: c.6th century

Site notes
- Public access: Yes (no facilities)

Ichiohakayama Kofun (市尾墓山古墳) is a burial mound, located in the Ichiohaka neighborhood of the town of Takatori, Nara prefecture in the Kansai region of Japan. Together with the Ichio Miyazuka Kofun, the tumulus was designated a National Historic Site of Japan in 1981.

== Overview ==
The Ichiohakayama Kofun is a zenpō-kōen-fun (前方後円墳), which is shaped like a keyhole, having one square end and one circular end, when viewed from above. It is located at the southern edge of the Nara Basin, between the Ochi Hills and the Ryumon Mountains. The Ichio Miyazuka Kofun is located to the southwest. Archaeological excavations have been conducted since 1975. The tumulus is orientated to the northwest and is approximately 63 meters long, with a 45 meter wide anterior rectangular portion, and 33.5 meter diameter posterior circular portions. Both sections are approximately eight meters high. The mound was built in two tiers using sandbags. In addition to the fukiishi roofing stones on the outside of the mound, a row of cylindrical haniwa can be seen near the burial chamber. A projection extends from the narrow part of the mound. The mound is surrounded by a six to eight meter wide shield-shaped moat, with a 12-meter wide outer bank that is two to three meters high around the outside of the moat. The entire length of the tumulus, including the moat and outer bank, is 100 meters. The burial chamber is a single-sleeved horizontal stone chamber in the posterior circular portion, opening to the southwest, with a hollowed-out house-shaped stone coffin inside. The stone coffin, which is 1.2 by 2.7 meters, is one of the largest known. A large number of grave goods have been recovered from this tumulus, including beads and other jewelry, weapons, horse equipment, Sue ware, and Haji ware pottery. From these grave goods and the style of the mound, this kofun was constructed in the early 6th century during the late Kofun period. As important ruins such as the Mizudoro Kofun and the remains of the Kose temple pagoda are found in the surrounding area, this tumulus has been linked to the Kose clan, a powerful late Kofun period clan who ruled this area during this period and who were active in diplomacy and military affairs with the Korean Peninsula.

Currently, the site is open to the public after maintenance work has been completed, but access to the burial chamber is restricted. The tumulus is about a five-minute walk from Ichio Station on the Kintetsu Railway Yoshino Line.

== See also ==
- List of Historic Sites of Japan (Nara)
