= Takatori, Nara =

Takatori 高取町
- Town
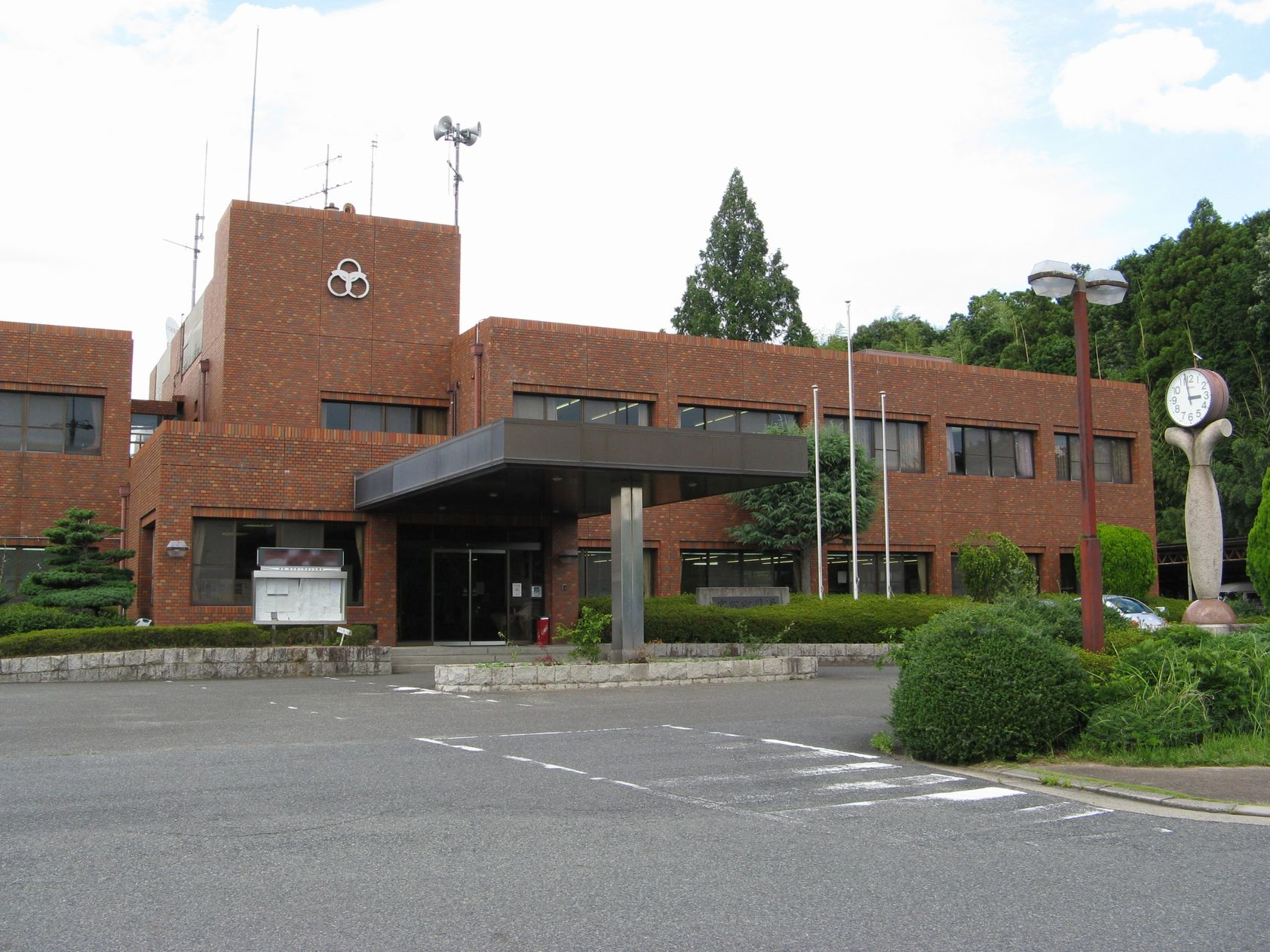
- Takatori Town Hall

- Flag Chapter
- Location of Takatori in Nara Prefecture

- Location in Japan
- Coordinates: 34°26′58″N 135°47′36″E
- Country: Japan
- Region: Kansai
- Prefecture: Nara
- District: Takaichi

Area
  - Total: 25.79 km^{2} (9.96 sq mi)

Population (September 30, 2024)
  - Total: 6,081
  - Density: 235.8/km^{2} (610.7/sq mi)
- Time zone: UTC+09:00 (JST)
- City hall address: 635-0154
- Website: Official website
- Symbols
- Flower: Azalea
- Tree: Maple

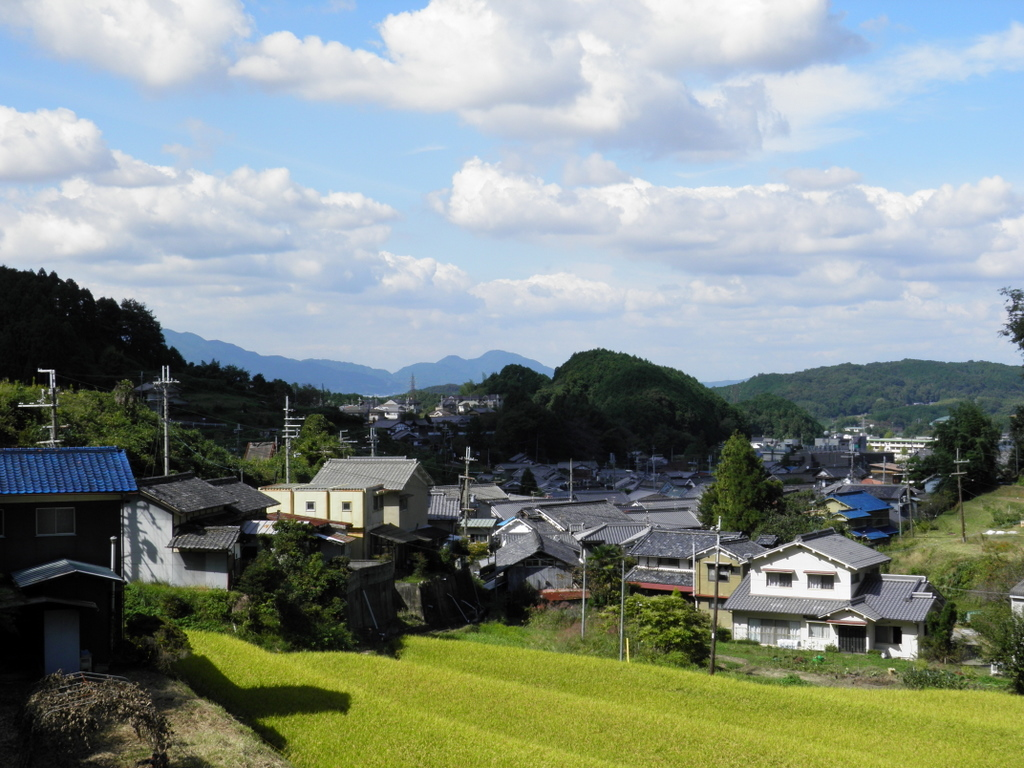
Takatori panorama

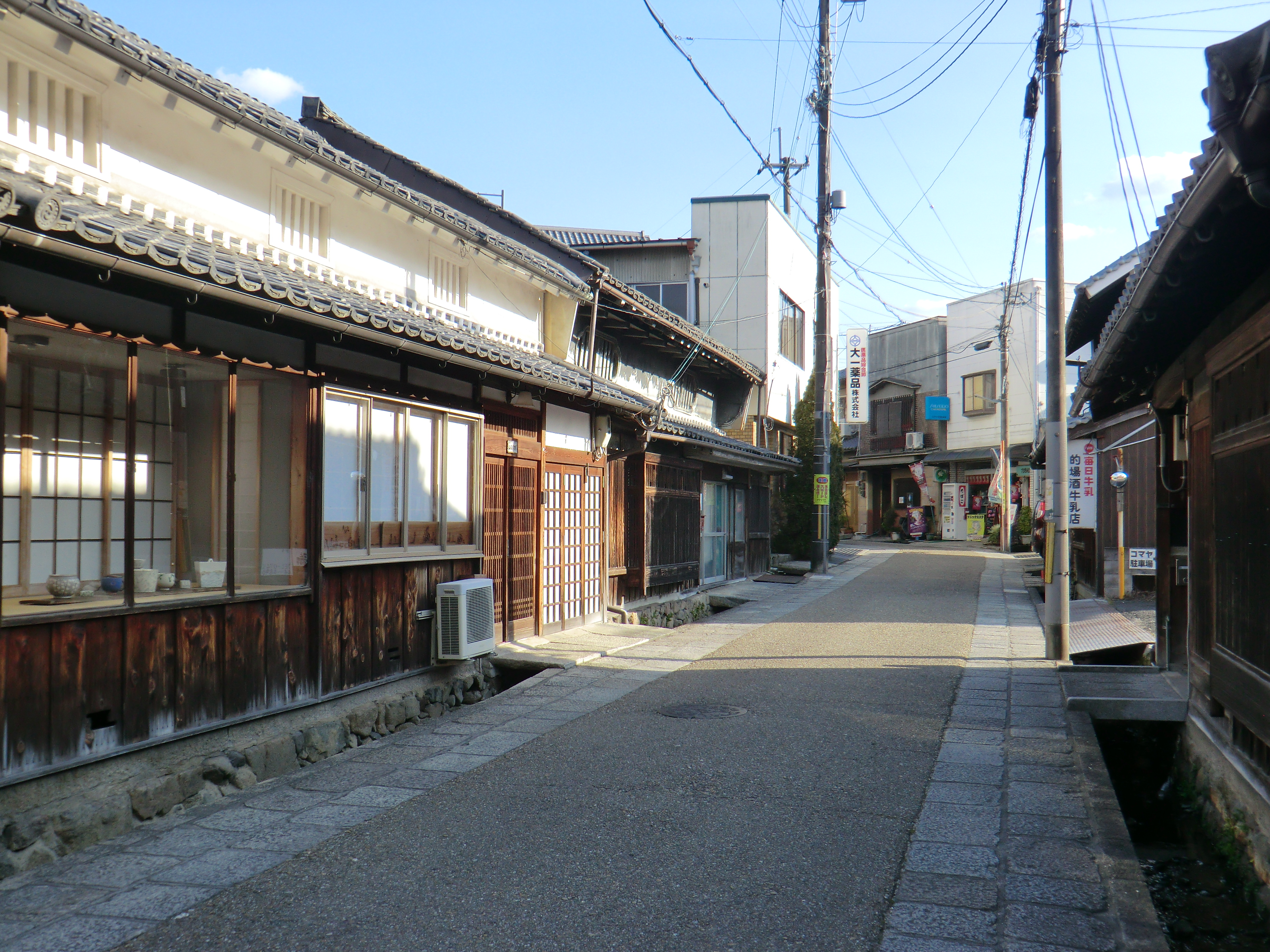
Tosa kaido in Takatori

Takatori (高取町, Takatori-chō) is a town located in Takaichi District, Nara Prefecture, Japan. As of 30 September 2024, the town had an estimated population of 6,081 in 2820 households, and a population density of 240 persons per km^{2}. The total area of the city is 25.79 km^{2} (9.96 sq mi).

== Geography ==
Located in central Nara Prefecture in the Nara Basin, most of the town is flat. The majority of the land is used for agriculture, especially for grain.

- Rivers : Takatori River, Soga River, Kibi River

=== Surrounding municipalities ===
Nara Prefecture

- Asuka
- Gose
- Kashihara
- Ōyodo
- Yoshino

=== Climate ===
Takatori has a humid subtropical climate (Köppen Cfa) characterized by warm summers and cool winters with light to no snowfall. The average annual temperature in Takatori is 14.2 °C. The average annual rainfall is 1636 mm with September as the wettest month. The temperatures are highest on average in August, at around 26.2 °C, and lowest in January, at around 2.8 °C.

=== Demographics ===
Per Japanese census data, the population of Takatori is as shown below

Historical population
Year	Pop.	±%
1940	7,678	—
1950	9,936	+29.4%
1960	9,819	−1.2%
1970	9,413	−4.1%
1980	8,909	−5.4%
1990	8,831	−0.9%
2000	8,153	−7.7%
2010	7,657	−6.1%
2020	6,729	−12.1%

== History ==
The area of Takatori was part of ancient Yamato Province. Located on the road connecting Asuka with Yoshino and Kii Province, many kofun burial mounds are located within the town. Per the Nihon Shoki and other ancient texts, this area was settled by many toraijin immigrant clans, including the Yamato no Aya clan and the Hata clan. The Nihon Shoki also contains a passage that prohibits felling of trees around Takatoriyama in 676 (the oldest forest conservation system in Japan) [1]. This suggests that the area had developed as a region that supported the surrounding population since ancient times. Per the Wamyō Ruijushō the Hata clan grew medicinal herbs brought to Japan from Silla in this area. During the Muromachi period, the area was ruled by the Ochi clan, and in the Sengoku period, the massive Takatori Castle was constructed. The town was the jōkamachi of Takatori Domain under the Tokugawa shogunate in the Edo period.

The village of Takatori was established on April 1, 1889, with the creation of the modern municipalities system. It was elevated to town status on June 3, 1891. On October 1, 1954, Takatori annexed the neighboring villages of Funakura and Ochioka.

== Government ==
Takatori has a mayor-council form of government with a directly elected mayor and a unicameral town council of eight members. Takatori, collectively with the cities of Kashihara and Takaichi, contributes four members to the Nara Prefectural Assembly. In terms of national politics, the town is part of the Nara 3rd district of the lower house of the Diet of Japan.

== Economy ==
The local economy is based on agriculture and pharmaceutical production.

== Education ==
Takatori has one public elementary schools and one public junior high school operated by the town government and one public high school operated by the Nara Prefectural Board of Education.

== Transportation ==
=== Railways ===
Kintetsu Railway - Yoshino Line

Tsubosakayama - Ichio

=== Highways ===
- National Route 169

== Local attractions ==
- Kojima-dera
- Tsubosaka-dera, No.6 of the Saigoku Kannon Pilgrimage
- Takatori Castle ruins, one of Japan's Top 100 Castles
- Yōraku Kofun Cluster, National Historic Site
- Ichiohakayama Kofun - Ichiomiyazuka Kofun, National Historic Sites
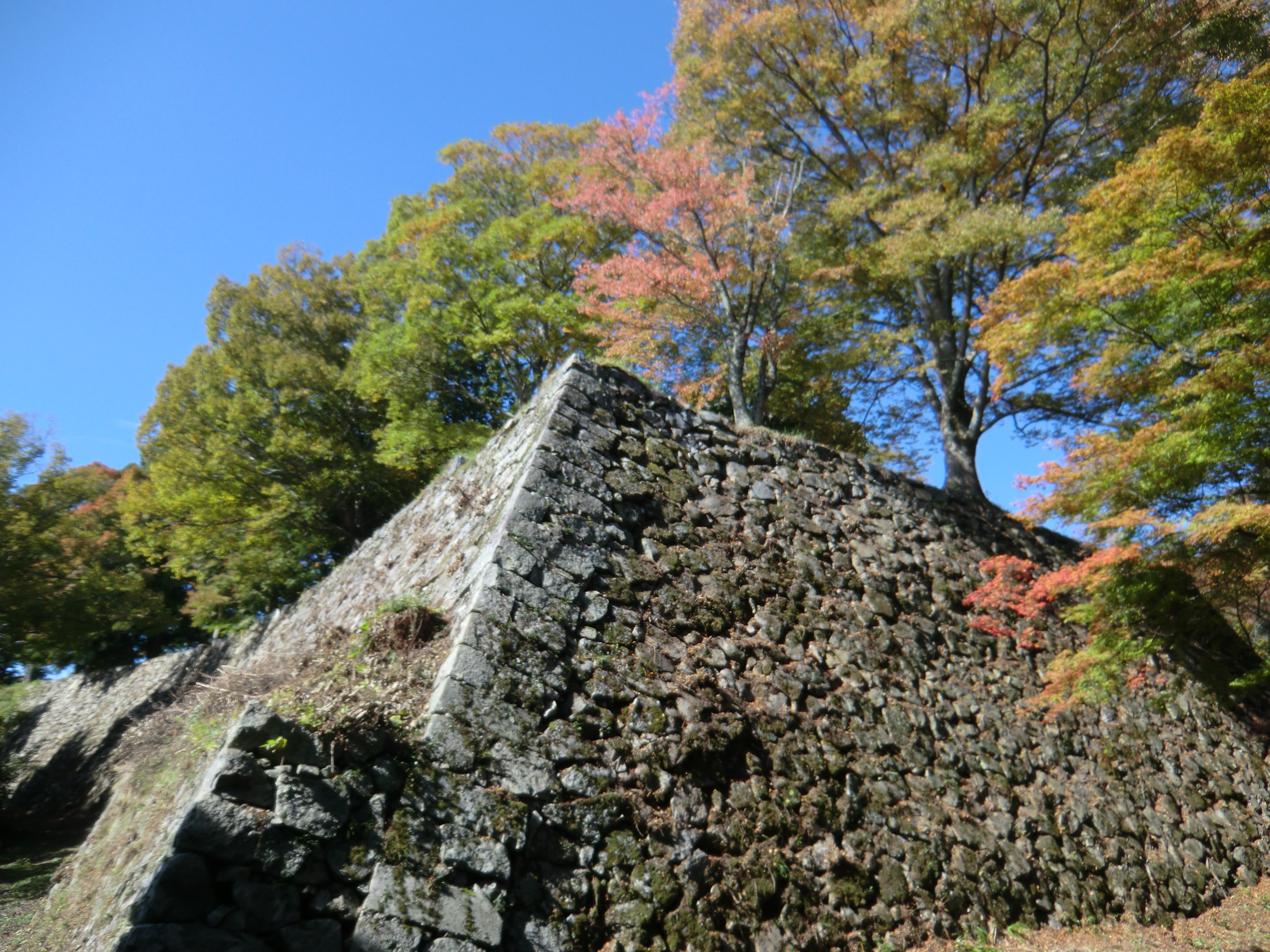
Takatori Castle Ruins

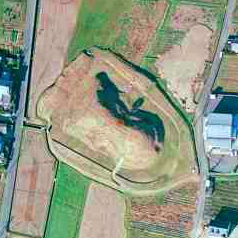
Ichiohakayama Kofun

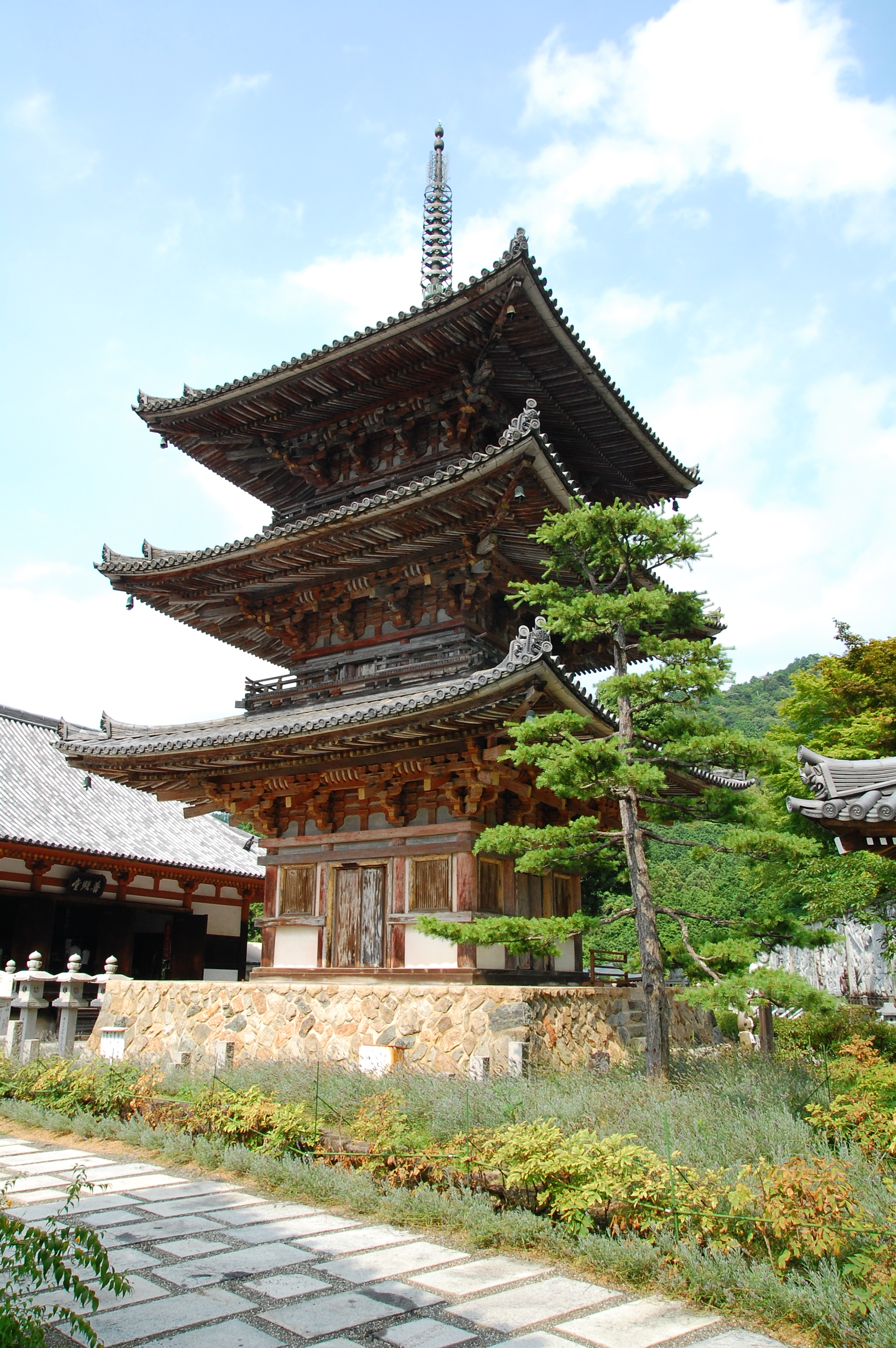
Tsubosaka-dera

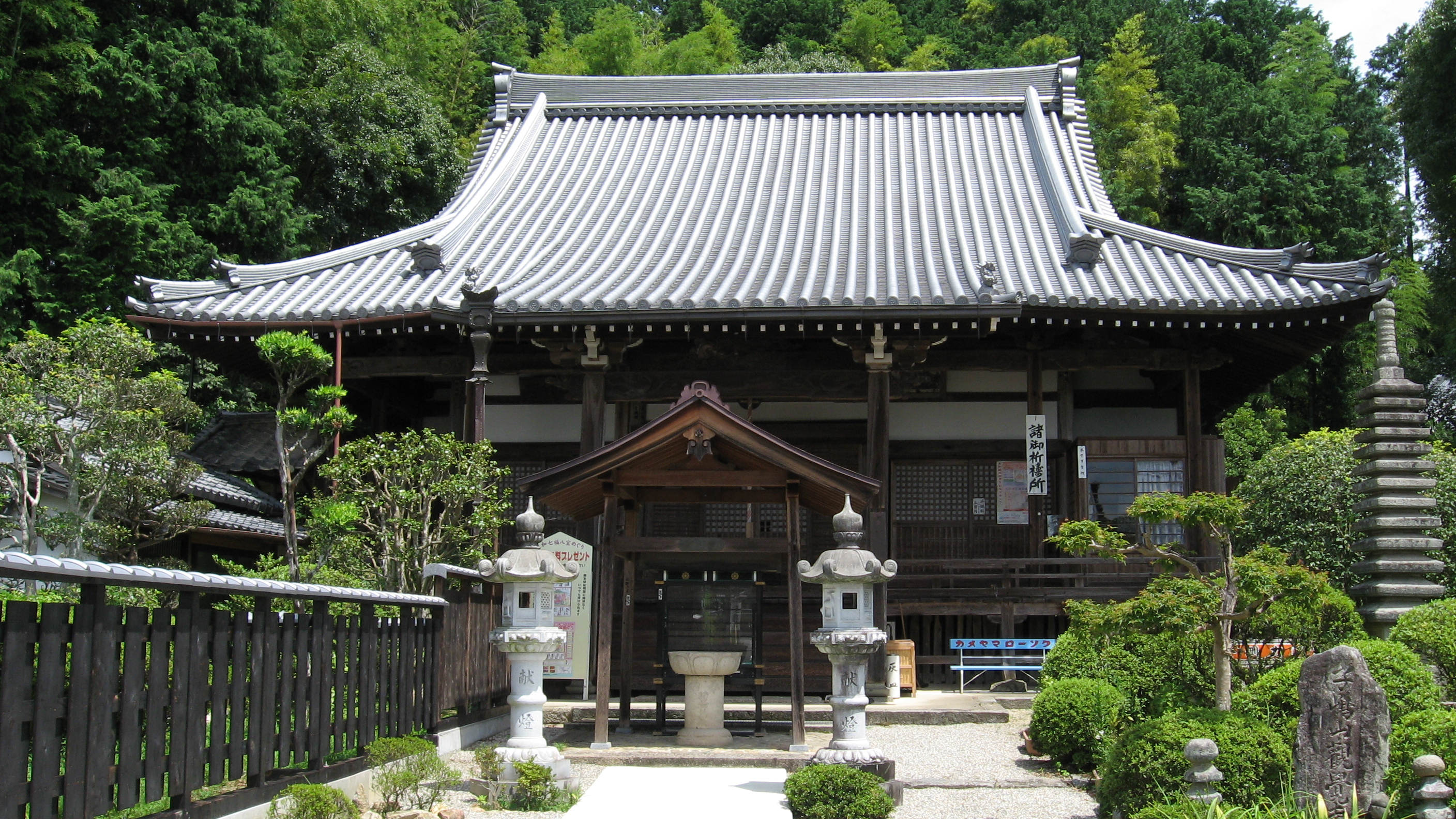
Kojima-dera
