= Kamimura =

Kamimura (written: 上村 or 神村) is a Japanese surname. Notable people with the surname include:

- Erika Kamimura (神村 江里加; born 1992), Japanese kickboxer
- Hikonojō Kamimura (上村 彦之丞; 1849–1916), Imperial Japanese Navy admiral
- Hina Kamimura (神村 ひな), Japanese voice actress
- Kazuo Kamimura (上村 一夫; 1940–1986), Japanese manga artist
- Sachiko Kamimura (神村 幸子), Japanese animator
- Wataru Kamimura (上村 亘; born 1986), Japanese shogi player
- Yuji Kamimura (上村 祐司; born 1976), Japanese footballer
- Yuta Kamimura (上村 優太; born 1995), Japanese racing driver
- Ukyou Kamimura (神村 右京; born 1972), Japanese musician
