= Takatori Domain =

Japanese feudal domain located in Yamato Province

Takatori Domain 高取藩
- Domain of Japan
- 1640–1871
- Mon of the Uemura clan

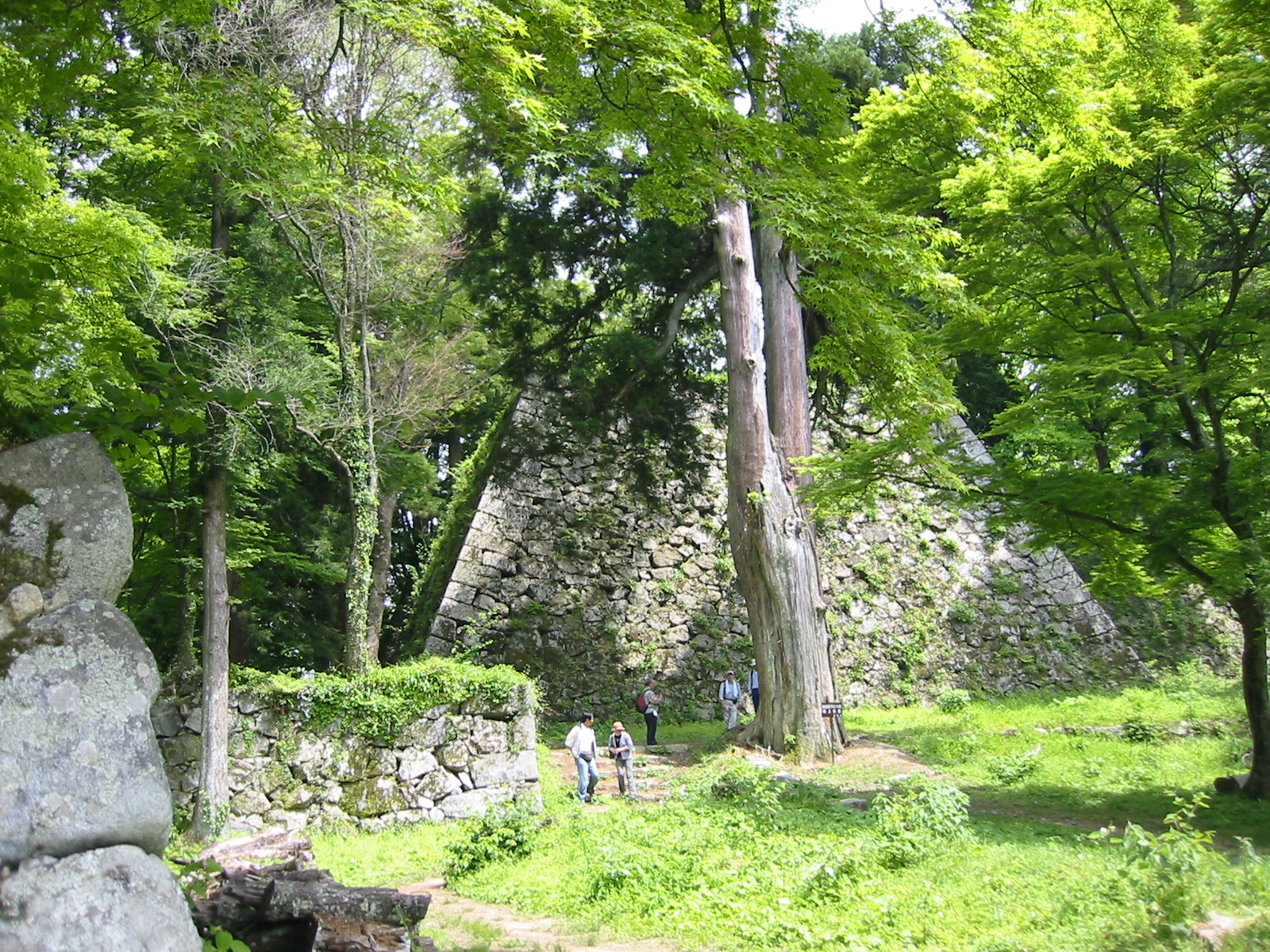
- Capital: Takatori Castle
- Government
  - Type: Daimyō
- Historical era: Edo period
  - Established: 1640
  - Disestablished: 1871
- Today part of: Nara Prefecture

Takatori Domain (高取藩) was a feudal domain established in 1640, and disestablished at the start of the Meiji Era in 1871. It was based in what was then Yamato Province, and is now Nara Prefecture. It was controlled by lords of the Uemura family for its entire existence as a domain.

== Establishment ==
From the Sengoku period to the Azuchi-Momoyama period, Yamato Province was ruled by Tsutsui Junkei, who served under Oda Nobunaga, but after Junkei's death, Toyotomi Hideyoshi, who took control of the country, sent Junkei's successor Tsutsui Sadatsugu to Iga. He transferred the territory to Ueno and gave Yamato to his younger brother Hidenaga in his place. Hidenaga gave his vassal Honda Toshihisa 15,000 koku of Takatori, and Toshihisa worked to improve and expand Takatori Castle. Honda Toshimasa, who succeeded Toshihisa, served Hideyoshi after Hidenaga's death, but at the Battle of Sekigahara, he sided with the eastern army and fought bravely against the western army that attacked Yamato. He was awarded 20,000 yen for his military service. The amount was increased to 5,000 koku (another theory says it was 30,000 koku). Also the Honda Owari clan has no blood relation to the Honda clan, including Honda Tadakatsu and Honda Masanobu.

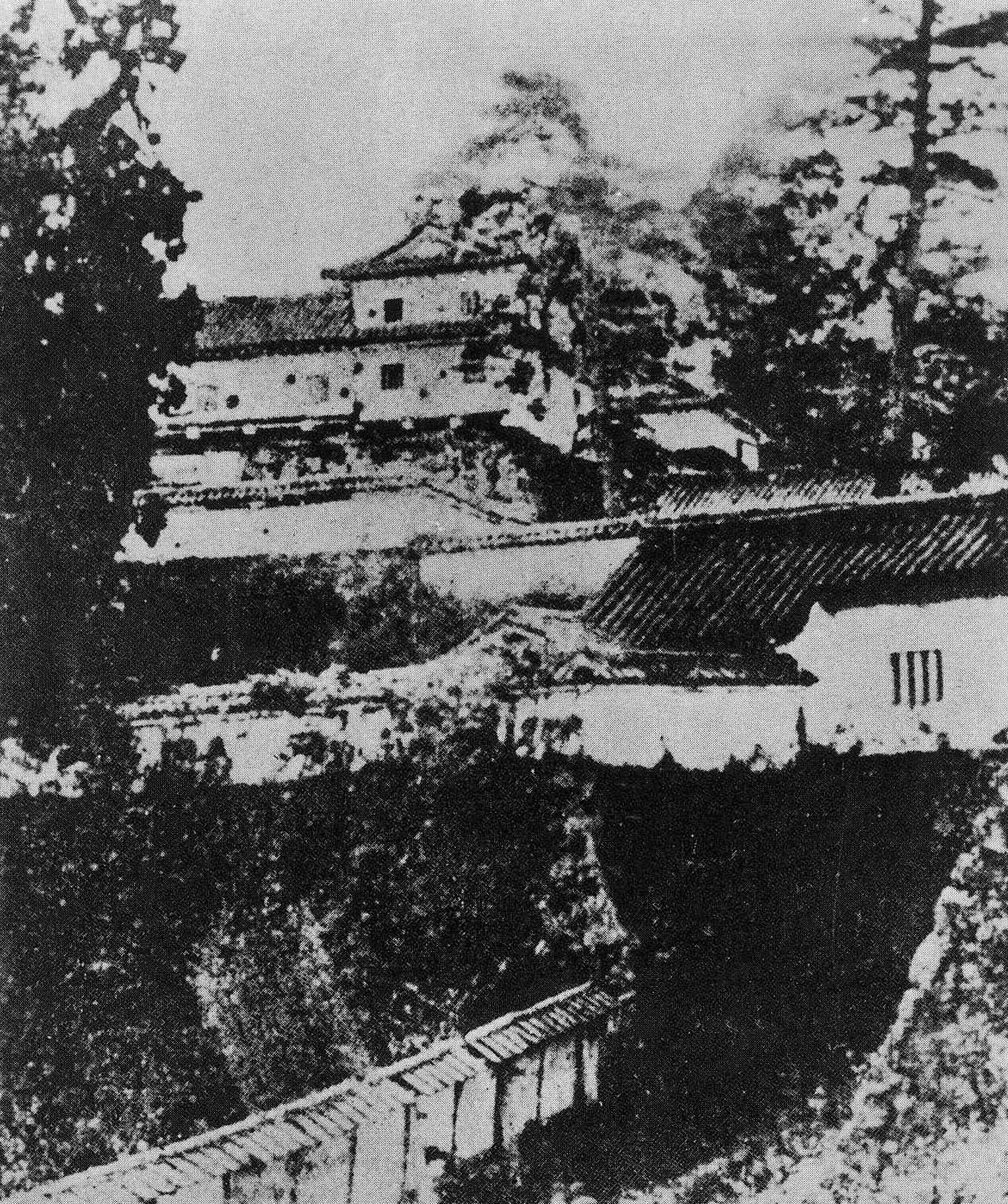
Aerial view of Kouriyanaj Castle

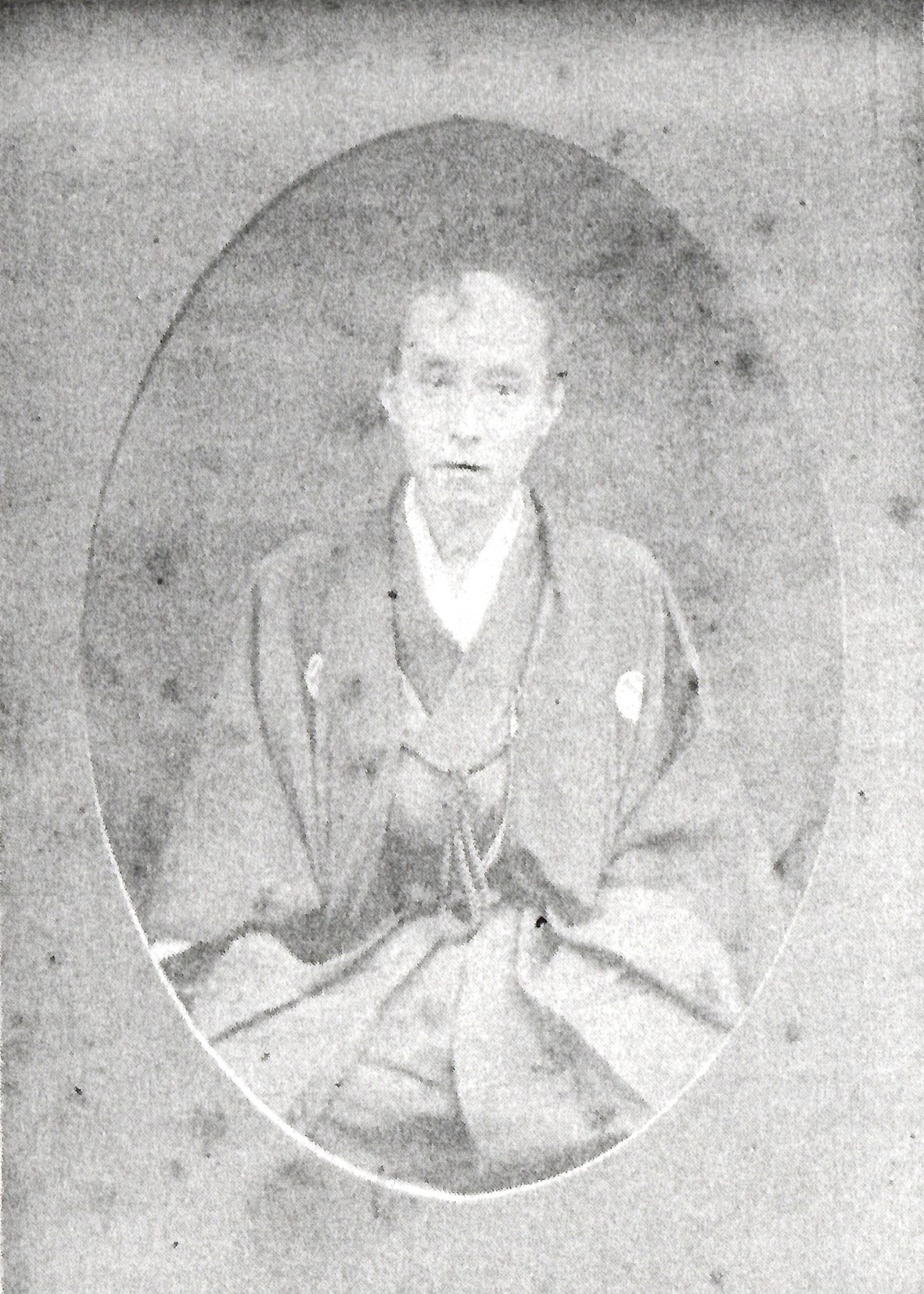
Uemura Iesayu, the 13th next to last daimyo of Takatori Domain

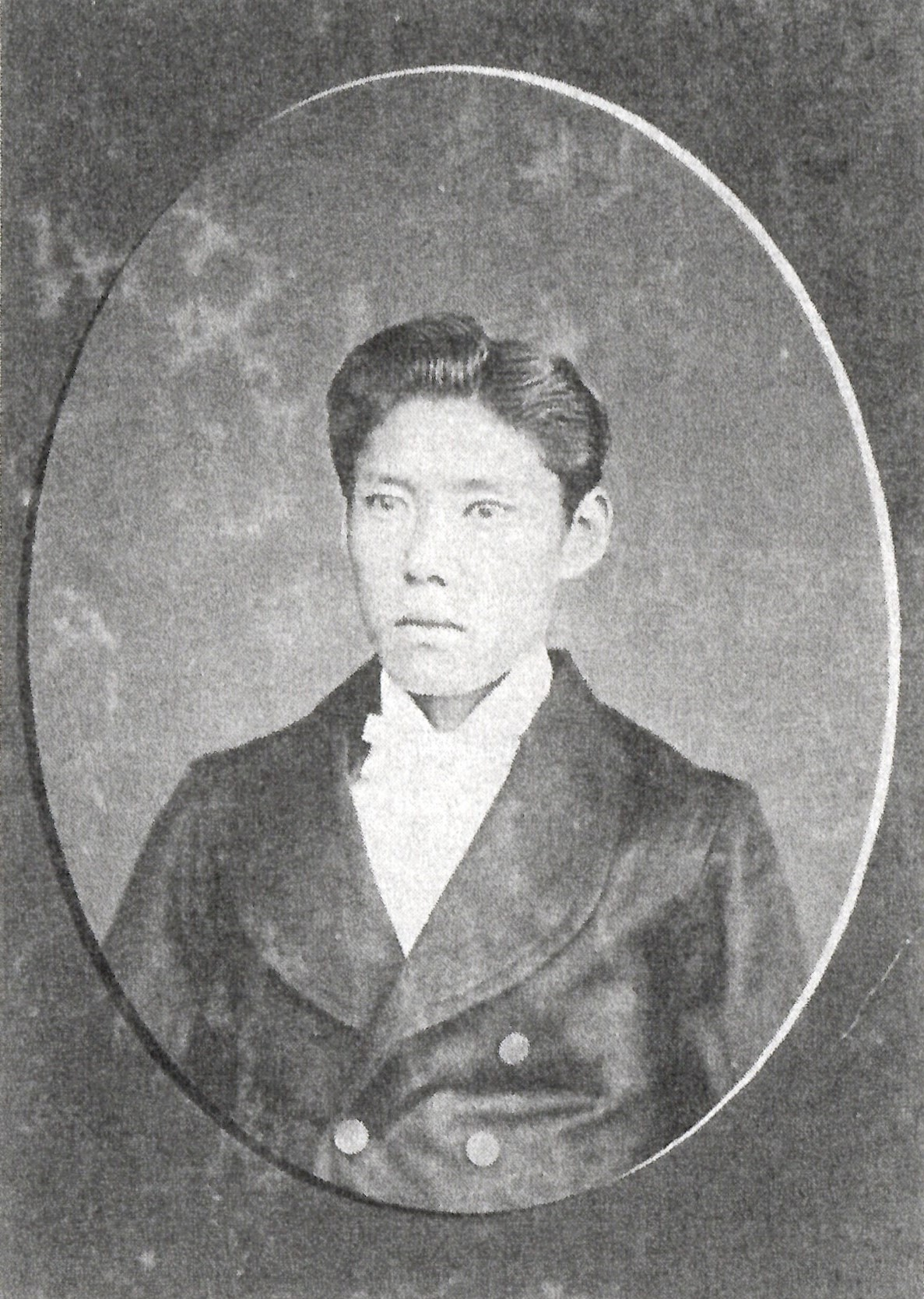
Uemura Iehiro, final daimyo of Takatori Domain

== History ==
Honda Masatake, the son of Honda Toshimasa who succeeded him, was a skilled Go player and emerged victorious in the Go Honinbo match in 1610. He also displayed his military prowess by serving on the Tokugawa side during the Siege of Osaka and actively participating in the restoration and construction of Osaka Castle and the Great Pagoda on Mt. Koya. Unfortunately, he died without leaving behind an heir in 1637, leading to the extinction of the Honda clan for a considerable period of time. The governance of the castle was then entrusted to Kuwayama Ichigen (Yamato-Shinjo domain) and Koide Yoshichika (Tamba Sonobe domain). Following the demise of the male line of the Uemura clan under Uemura Ietaka, the three feudal lords towards the end of the Edo period were all adopted from other families. Among them, Uemura Ieyasu, the 13th lord of the domain, achieved remarkable success in safeguarding the waters near Osaka and suppressing the Tenchu-gumi rebellion. He also played an active role in defending Kyoto. However, influenced by Tanisanzan, the Uemura clan held great respect for the king and consequently supported the government army during the Boshin War, guarding the Kyoto Imperial Palace. Subsequently, in collaboration with Oda Nagayoshi, the lord of Yamato Shibamura, they suppressed the former shogunate territory in Yamato. The final daimyo, Uemura Iehiro, became a chihan due to the Meiji restoration of land ownership in June 1869. In 1871, when the domain was abolished and prefectures were established, he resigned as the domain governor, leading to the dissolution of the Takatori Domain. Following this, Takatori was incorporated into Nara Prefecture through Takatori Prefecture.

== Holdings at the end of the Edo ==
- Yamato
  - Kuzugami-gun – 3 villages
  - Kuzushimo-gun – 2 villages
  - Takaichi County – 79 villages
  - Toichi-gun – 1 village
  - Yoshino-gun – 1 village

== List of daimyo ==
#	Name	Tenure	Courtesy title	Court Rank	kokudaka
Uemura clan, 1640–1871(Tozama daimyo)
1	Uemura Iemasa (植村家政)	1640–1650	Dewa no kami (出羽守)	Junior 5th Rank, Lower Grade (従五位下)	25,000 koku
2	Uemura Iesada (植村家貞)	1650–1687	Uemon no suke (右衛門佐)	Junior 5th Rank, Lower Grade (従五位下)	25,000 koku
3	Uemura Ienobu (植村家言)	1687–1696	Dewa no kami (出羽守)	Junior 5th Rank, Lower Grade (従五位下)	25,000 koku
4	Uemura Ieyuki (植村家敬)	1696–1731	Uemon no suke(右衛門佐)	Junior 5th Rank, Lower Grade (従五位下)	22,000 koku
5	Uemura Iekatsu (植村家包)	1731–1738	Dewa no kami (出羽守)	Junior 5th Rank, Lower Grade (従五位下)	20,500 koku
6	Uemura Iemichi (植村家道)	1738–1767	Dewa no kami (出羽守)	Junior 5th Rank, Lower Grade (従五位下)	20,500 koku
7	Uemura Iehisa (植村家久)	1767–1778	Dewa no kami (出羽守)	Junior 5th Rank, Lower Grade (従五位下)	20,500 koku
8	Uemura Ietoshi (植村家利)	1779–1785	Uemon no suke (右衛門佐)	Junior 5th Rank, Lower Grade (従五位下)	20,500 koku
9	Uemura Ienaga (植村家長)	1785–1828	Suruga no kami (駿河守)	Junior 5th Rank, Lower Grade (従五位下)	20,500 koku
10	Uemura Ienori (植村家教)	1828–1848	Ise no kami (伊勢守)	Junior 5th Rank, Lower Grade (従五位下)	25,000 koku
11	Uemura Ietaka (植村家貴)	1848–1853	Mino no kami (美濃守)	Junior 5th Rank, Lower Grade (従五位下)	25,000 koku
12	Uemura Ieoki (植村家興)	1853	None	Junior 5th Rank, Lower Grade (従五位下)	25,000 koku
13	Uemura Ieyasu (植村家保)	1853–1868	Gonsho Kyojo (権少教正)	Senior 4th Rank, Lower Grade (従五位下)	25,000 koku
14	Uemura Iehiro (植村家壷)	1868–1871	Dewa no kami (出羽守)	Junior 2nd Rank, Lower Grade (従五位下)	25,000 koku

== See also ==
- List of Han
- Abolition of the han system
