= Uemura Iemasa =

Uemura Iemasa (植村 家政, 1589 – December 16, 1650) was a page under Tokugawa Hidetada during the year of 1599. During the year of 1608, was to become a commander of the Ashigaru. During the year of 1640, Iemasa was present during the Siege of Osaka, and afterwards Iemasa was rewarded with the title of daimyō over Takatori with an income of 25,000 koku.
