= Ancient Capitals of Asuka and Fujiwara =

Cluster of archaeological sites in Japan

UNESCO World Heritage Site
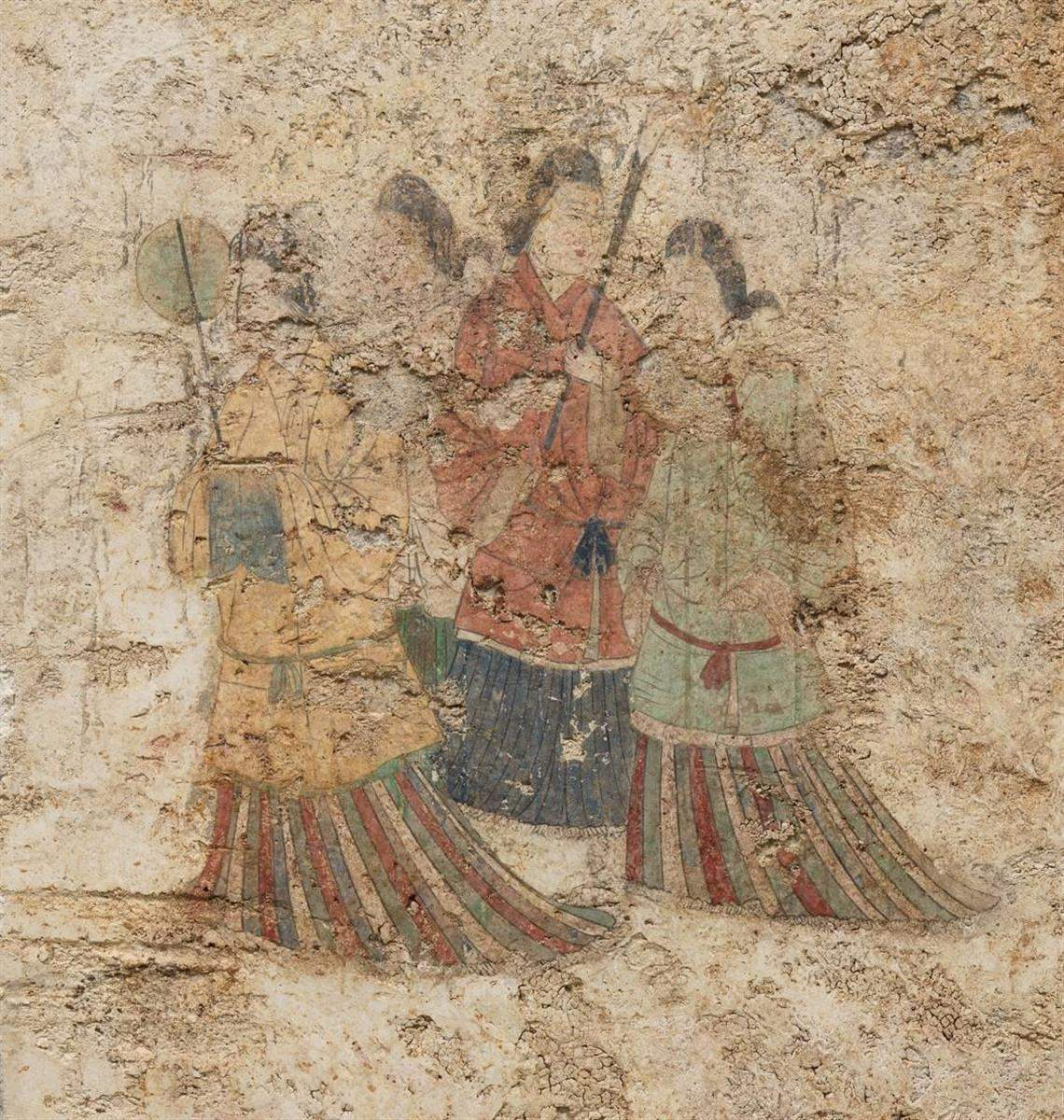

- Location within Japan Location within Kansai region Location within Nara Prefecture
- Criteria: Cultural: ii, iii
- Reference: 1757
- Inscription: 2026 (48th Session)
- Area: 137.99 ha (0.5328 sq mi)
- Buffer zone: 1,127.93 ha (4.3550 sq mi)
- Coordinates: 34.473413°N 135.821125°E

Ancient Capitals of Asuka and Fujiwara (飛鳥・藤原の宮都, Asuka・Fujiwara no kyū-to) is a cluster of nineteen archaeological sites from in and around the late sixth- to early eighth-century capitals of Asuka and Fujiwara, Nara Prefecture, Japan. In 2026, the serial nomination was inscribed on the UNESCO World Heritage List under criteria ii and iii.

Since 2011, the Cultural Landscape of the Asuka Hinterland has been protected as one of the Cultural Landscapes of Japan. An area of 60 ha is also protected within the Asuka Historical National Government Park. Related artefacts are housed at the Asuka Historical Museum.

== Component sites ==
Seventeen of the nineteen component sites have been designated for protection under the Law for the Protection of Cultural Properties as Historic Sites or *Special Historic Sites ("ACA" column below).

UNESCO ID	Site	Municipality	Comments	Image	Coordinates	ACA
1757-001	Asuka Palace Site 飛鳥宮跡; Asuka no miya ato	Asuka	comprising the sites of the Okamoto Palace, Itabuki Palace, Later Okamoto Palace, and Kiyomihara Palace		34°28′24″N 135°49′16″E	
1757-002	Asuka Pond Garden Site 飛鳥京跡苑池; Asuka-kyō ato enchi	Asuka	also a Place of Scenic Beauty; a pair of ponds in gardens extending 80 metres E-W and at least 230 metres N-S and related to the Itabuki Palace		34°28′30″N 135°49′07″E	
1757-003	Asuka Water Clock Site 飛鳥水落遺跡; Asuka mizuochi iseki	Asuka			34°28′49″N 135°49′06″E	
1757-004	Sakafuneishi Ritual Site 酒船石遺跡; Sakafune-ishi iseki	Asuka			34°28′32″N 135°49′24″E	
1757-005	Asuka-dera Temple Site 飛鳥寺跡; Asukadera ato	Asuka			34°28′43″N 135°49′14″E	
1757-006	Tachibana-dera Temple Site 橘寺跡; Tachibanadera ato	Asuka			34°28′12″N 135°49′04″E	
1757-007	*Yamada-dera Temple Site 山田寺跡; Yamadadera ato	Sakurai	with well-preserved ICP wooden corridors discovered in 1982		34°29′03″N 135°49′48″E	
1757-008	Kawara-dera Temple Site 川原寺跡; Kawaradera ato	Asuka	temple complex with roof tiles that are "among the most beautiful ever made in Japan"		34°28′21″N 135°49′03″E	
1757-009	Hinokuma-dera Temple Site 檜隈寺跡; Hinokumadera ato	Asuka	recipient in 686 of a thirty-year maintenance grant of a hundred households, as chronicled in Nihon Shoki		34°27′24″N 135°48′11″E	
1757-010	*Ishibutai Mounded Tomb 石舞台古墳; Ishibutai kofun	Asuka	C7 kofun; the largest stone weighs over seventy-five tons;		34°28′01″N 135°49′34″E	
1757-011	Shobuike Mounded Tomb 菖蒲池古墳; Shōbuike kofun	Kashihara	C7 rectangular tumulus with two sarcophagi		34°28′21″N 135°48′28″E	
1757-012	Kengoshizuka Mounded Tomb 牽牛子塚古墳; Kengoshizuka kofun	Asuka	with ICP grave goods		34°27′59″N 135°47′33″E	
1757-013	*Fujiwara Palace Site 藤原宮跡; Fujiwara-kyū seki	Kashihara	in the former capital		34°30′08″N 135°48′26″E	
1757-014	Daikandaiji Temple Site 大官大寺跡; Daikandaiji ato	Kashihara	precursor to Daian-ji		34°29′18″N 135°49′05″E	
1757-015	*Motoyakushiji Temple Site 本薬師寺跡; Moto Yakushiji ato	Kashihara	precursor to Yakushi-ji; established by Emperor Temmu for the recovery of Empress Jitō		34°29′34″N 135°48′00″E	
1757-016	Mounded Tomb of Emperor Temmu and Empress Jito 天武・持統天皇陵古墳; Tenmu・Jitō tennō ryō kofun	Asuka			34°28′08″N 135°48′28″E	
1757-017	Nakaoyama Mounded Tomb 中尾山古墳; Nakaoyama kofun	Asuka			34°27′51″N 135°48′22″E	
1757-018	*Kitora Mounded Tomb キトラ古墳; Kitora kofun	Asuka	with National Treasure wall paintings of the four directions and an astronomical chart, now detached		34°27′04″N 135°48′19″E	
1757-019	*Takamatsuzuka Mounded Tomb 高松塚古墳; Takamatsuzuka kofun	Asuka	with National Treasure wall paintings (detached in 2007) and ICP grave goods		34°27′44″N 135°48′22″E	

== Previously-nominated component sites ==
In 2007, twenty-eight sites were submitted jointly for future inscription on the UNESCO World Heritage List as "Asuka-Fujiwara: Archaeological sites of Japan's Ancient Capitals and Related Properties", under criteria ii, iii, iv, v, and vi. The number of component sites in the nominated property was subsequently reduced to nineteen. The following sites formed part of the original submission:

Site	Municipality	Comments	Image	Coordinates
Jōrin-ji Site 定林寺跡; Jōrinji ato	Asuka	Historic Site		34°28′01″N 135°48′46″E
Iwayayama Kofun 岩屋山古墳; Iwayayama kofun	Asuka	Historic Site		34°27′57″N 135°47′51″E
Itabuki Palace Site 伝飛鳥板蓋宮跡 den Asuka Itabuki no miya ato	Asuka	Historic Site and one of the imperial palaces while the capital was at Asuka		34°28′24″N 135°49′16″E
Inabuchi Palace Site 飛鳥稲淵宮殿跡; Asuka Inabuchi kyūden ato	Asuka	Historic Site		34°27′47″N 135°49′20″E
Marukoyama Kofun マルコ山古墳; Marukoyama kofun	Asuka	Historic Site		34°27′39″N 135°47′26″E
Asuka Pond Workshop Site 飛鳥池工房遺跡; Asuka-ike kōbō iseki	Asuka	Historic Site and government workshop, producing items of gold, silver, bronze, and iron, as well as lacquerware; also a mint		34°28′38″N 135°49′21″E
Oka-dera Site 岡寺跡; Okadera ato	Asuka	Historic Site		34°28′18″N 135°49′41″E
Ueyama Kofun 植山古墳; Ueyama kofun	Kashihara	Historic Site unearthed during studies to reroute the city's roads, comprising two rectangular burial mounds c.13m long with stone chambers in a hill measuring 40x27m; of different construction dates in late C6 and C7		34°28′35″N 135°48′14″E
Maruyama Kofun 丸山古墳; Maruyama kofun	Kashihara	Historic Site investigated by William Gowland, a rectangular chamber with two sarcophagi, long corridor, and stone roof weighing in excess of a hundred tons		34°28′36″N 135°47′53″E
Fujiwara-kyō Suzaku Avenue Site 藤原京朱雀大路跡; Fujiwara-kyō seki Suzaku-ōji ato	Kashihara	Historic Site (see also Suzakumon)		34°29′46″N 135°48′27″E
Yamato Sanzan 大和三山; Yamato sanzan	Kashihara	Place of Scenic Beauty and meisho celebrated in Japanese poetry		34°30′54″N 135°48′20″E

== See also ==
- Asuka period
- List of National Treasures of Japan (archaeological materials)
- List of World Heritage Sites in Japan
