= Inukai Man'yō Memorial Hall =

Museum in Asuka, Nara, Japan

- 犬養万葉記念館
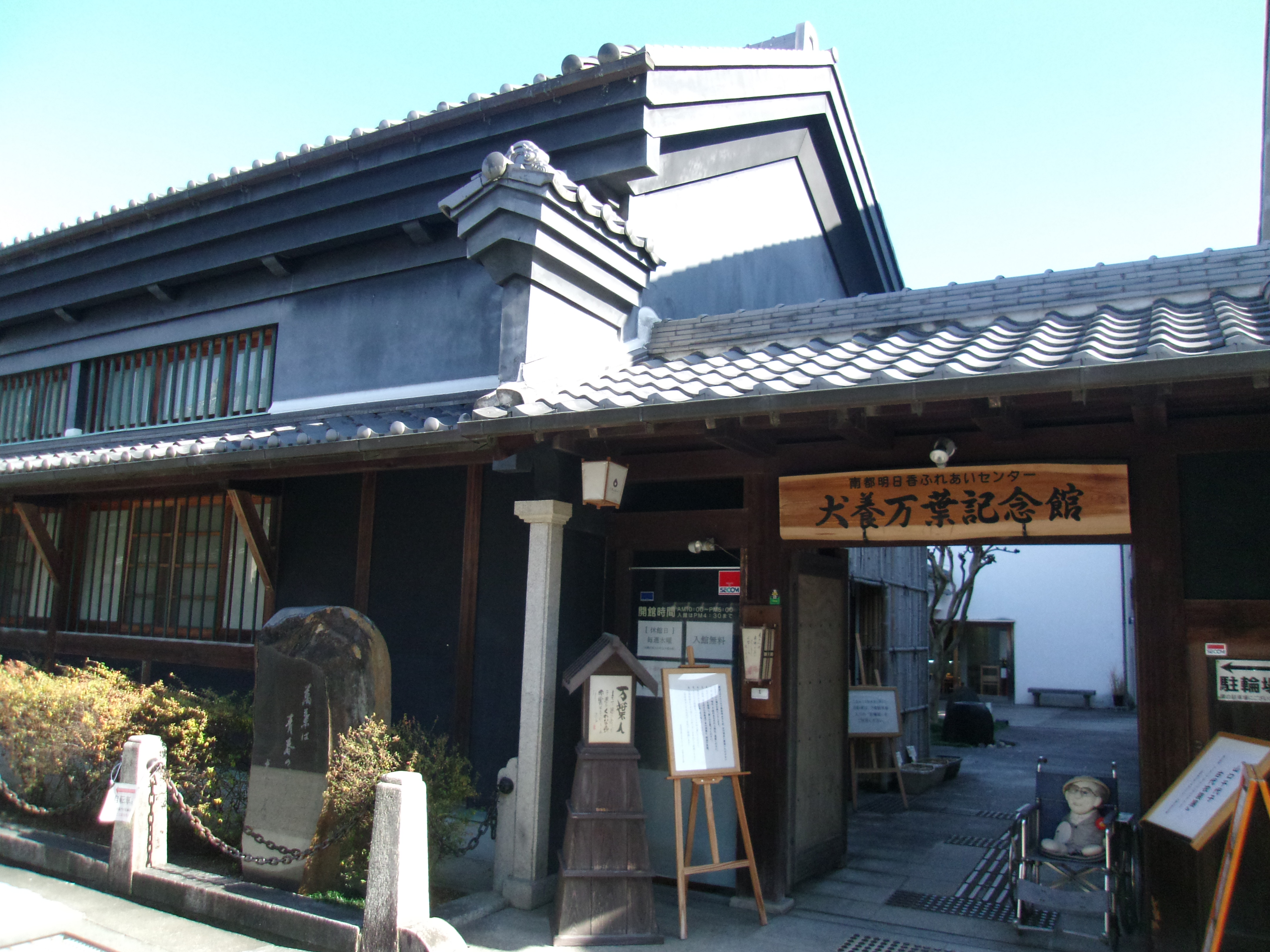
- Interactive map of the Inukai Man'yō Memorial Hall area

General information
- Location: 1150 Oka, Asuka, Nara Prefecture, Japan
- Coordinates: 34°28′14″N 135°49′21″E
- Opened: 1 April 2000

Website
- Official website (ja)

Inukai Man'yō Memorial Hall (犬養万葉記念館, Inukai Man'yō Kinenkan) opened in Asuka, Nara Prefecture, Japan, in 2000. The museum is dedicated to Inukai Takashi, scholar and popularizer of the Man'yōshū, displaying his books and personal effects; there are also recordings of his recitation of poems in the anthology. The museum building formerly served, from 1926, as the local branch of Nanto Bank.

== See also ==
- Nara Prefecture Complex of Man'yo Culture
- Manyo Botanical Garden, Nara
- Asuka Historical Museum
- Asuka-Fujiwara
