= Asuka Historical Museum =

- 飛鳥資料館
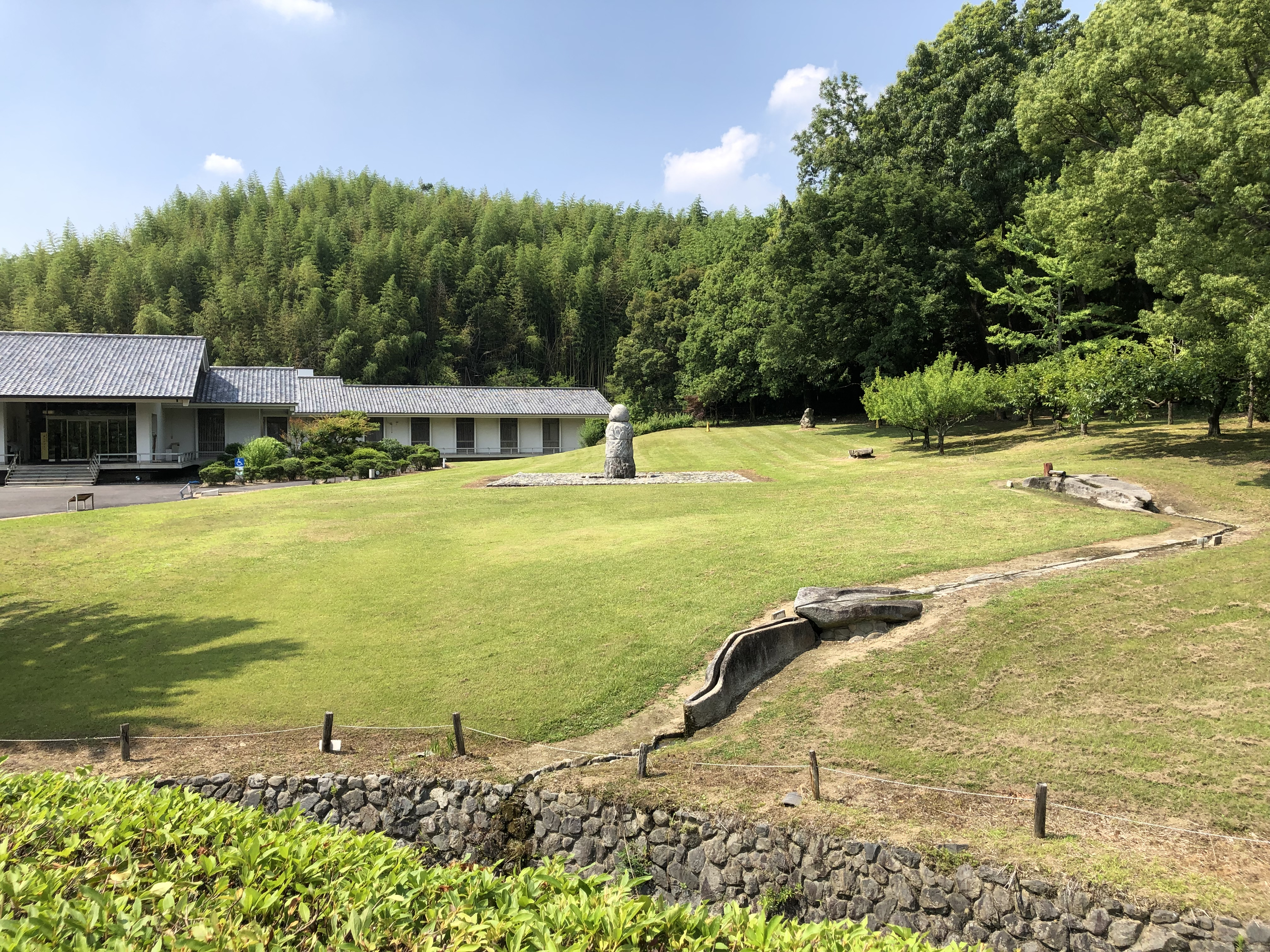
- Asuka Historical Museum

- Location of Asuka Historical Museum, Asuka, Nara Prefecture, Japan
- Established: 1975
- Location: Okuyama, Asuka, Nara Prefecture, Japan
- Coordinates: 34.484504°N 135.824962°E
- Type: Historical museum
- Director: Keiji Matsumura
- Curator: Shinji Katō
- Public transit access: By bus from Kashiharajingū-mae Station, Asuka Station, Nara Sakurai Station, or Yamato-Yagi Station
- Parking: On site (no charge)
- Website: Asuka Historical Museum 飛鳥資料館(in Japanese)

The Asuka Historical Museum (飛鳥資料館, Asuka Shiryōkan) is a historical museum in Okuyama, Asuka, Nara Prefecture, Japan. The museum was founded in 1975 and is a unit of the Nara National Research Institute for Cultural Properties.

== Collections ==
The Asuka Historical Museum primarily preserves and exhibits materials from the 6th to 8th centuries, specifically from the Asuka period (538–710) of Japanese history. Its collection also includes materials from the late Kofun period (250–538) and Nara period (710–794). Unlike other regional museums which house well-known materials from the early periods of Japanese history, Asuka Historical Museum exhibits materials from recent, local excavations. The Asuka Historical Museum is a repository of materials excavated by the Department of Imperial Palace Sites Investigations of the Nara National Research Institute for Cultural Properties. Its collections center on materials from the Asuka, Fujiwara, and Heijō palaces.

== Exhibits ==
The Asuka Historical Museum houses regular exhibits in two halls. Exhibit Hall 1 focuses on materials associated with the Asuka Palace and the Soga clan, along with Asuka-dera, Kawara-dera, and the Takamatsuzuka and Kitora tumuli. Exhibit Hall 2 features excavated materials from the Yamada-dera cloister, which was built by Soga no Kurayamada no Ishikawamaro (d. 649), a grandson of Soga no Umako (551?– 626). The gardens of the museum house reproductions of large-scale rock carvings and statues from the Asuka period. Special exhibits are held in the spring and fall, and the museum has a small library.

== Facility ==
The museum facility is a concrete structure built in the sukiya-zukuri Japanese residential architectural style. The museum, along with other institutes and historical sites related to the Asuka period, is included in the 60 hectares (150 acres) of the Asuka Historical National Government Park.

== Publications ==
Like other units of the Nara National Research Institute for Cultural Properties, the Asuka Historical Museum publishes exhibition catalogs and technical reports on museum research. The museum has published the monographic series Asuka Shiryōkan Zuroku (飛鳥資料館図錄) since 1973, prior to the official opening of the museum.

== Transportation ==
The Asuka Historical Museum is accessible by bus from numerous train stations:

- Kashiharajingū-mae Station on Kintetsu Kashihara Line, Minami Osaka Line and Yoshino Lines
- Asuka Station on the Yoshino Line
- Nara Sakurai Station on JR-West Man-yō Mahoroba Line and Kintetsu Osaka Line
- Yamato-Yagi Station on the Osaka Line

== See also ==
- Asuka period
- Asuka, Yamato
- Asuka-Fujiwara
- Fujiwara-kyō
- Heijō
- Asuka Historical National Government Park
