= Nakaoyama Kofun =

Kofun period octagonal-shaped burial mound in Japan

- 中尾山古墳 (Japanese)
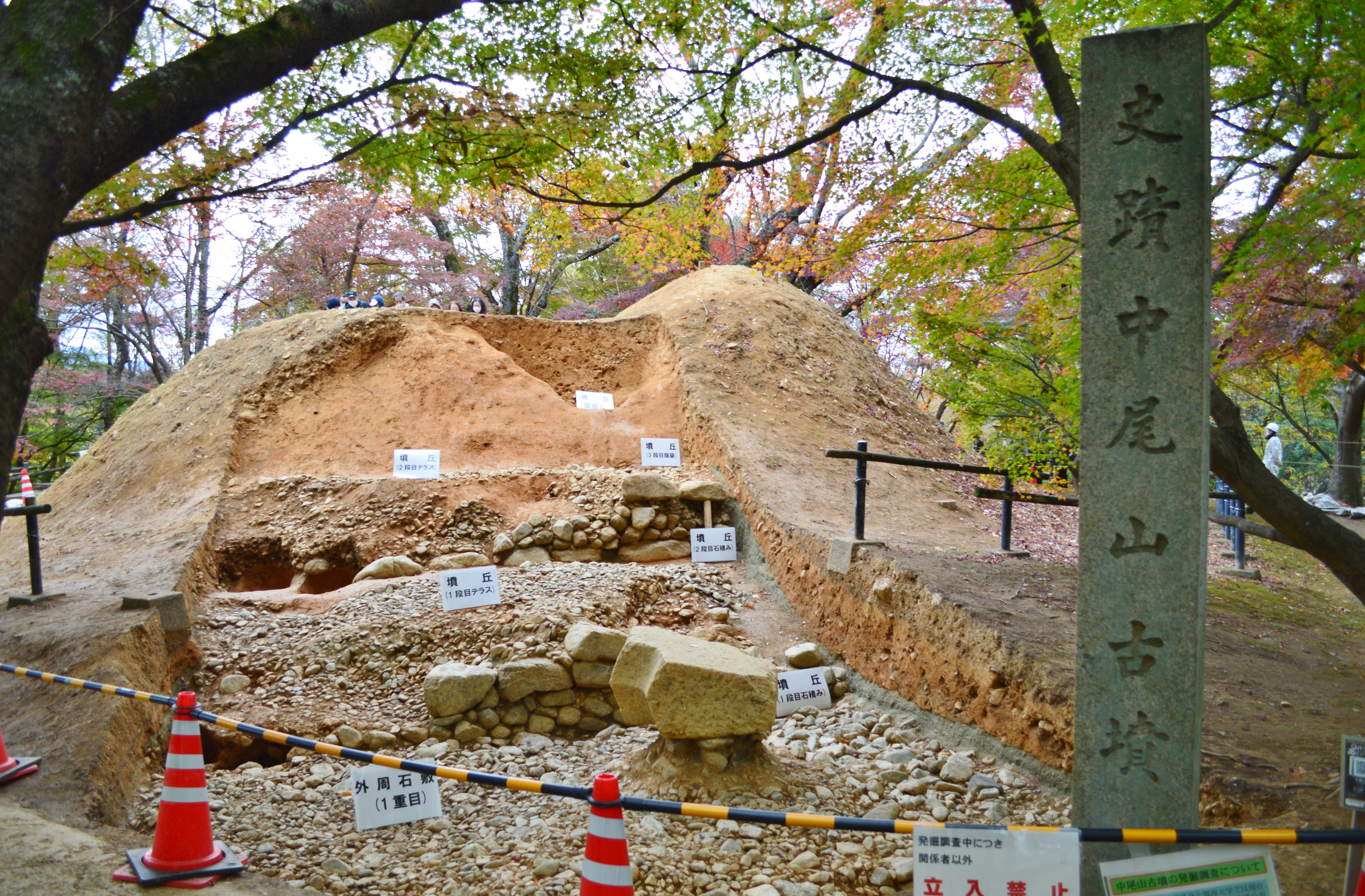
- Nakaoyama Kofun during 2020 excavations

- Nakaoyama Kofun, funkyu-1.jpg Nakaoyama Kofun (Japan)
- Interactive map of Nakaoyama Kofun
- 34°27′51.25″N 135°48′21.95″E
- Type: Kofun
- Periods: Kofun period
- Location: Asuka, Nara, Japan
- Region: Kansai region

History
- Built: c.7th century

Site notes
- Public access: Yes (no facilities)

Nakaoyama Kofun (中尾山古墳) is a Kofun period burial mound, located in the Uta neighborhood of the village of Asuka, Nara in the Kansai region of Japan. The tumulus was designated a National Historic Site of Japan in 1927.

== Overview ==
The Nakaoyama Kofun is located 1.5 kilometers southwest of the ruins of Asuka-kyō on the southeastern edge of the Nara Basin. This area has been called "Hinokuma" since ancient times, and Nakaoyama Kofun in particular is located at the highest point of a ridge where the tombs of Emperor Tenmu and Empress Jitō are located to the north, and the tomb of Emperor Mommu and the Takamatsuzuka Kofun are visible to the south. An archaeological survey was conducted in 1925, and it was found to be a hakkaku-fun (八角墳) octagonal kofun with a diameter of 22 meters and a height of 3.2 meters. The mound is built in three tiers using the tamped earth method. The first and second tiers of the mound are made of low stone foundations which act as a base, while the third tier is made of only piled earth. A distinctive feature of this tumulus is the stonework on the outside of the tumulus. Most of the gravel that covered the surface has been lost, but vertical stonework terraces have been confirmed. The mound is surrounded by a triple row of outer stone paving.

The burial facility is a horizontal-entry stone burial chamber, consisting of a total of ten stones (nine of which remain): one for the bottom, inner wall, closing stone, ceiling stone, two for the side walls, and four corner stones (pillars) (one missing). The inside of the stone chamber is polished smooth and painted with vermilion red. Quartz diorite is used for the floor stone, and the center of the floor is carved into a concave shape measuring 60-cm on each side and 1-cm deep. It is believed that a platform was installed in this section to place an ossuary containing the cremated bones. A grave passage is provided on the south side of the blocking stone, and was backfilled with tamped earth after the burial. A culvert drainage ditch approximately 100-cm wide and 20-cm deep filled with fist-sized river stones is provided on the underside of this grave passage. The tumulus was the subject of grave robberies during the Kamakura period, and during excavations in 1974 and 2020 no grave goods were recovered.

The Nakaoyama Kofun is estimated to have been built around the beginning of the 8th century, at the end of the Kofun period. It is unique in that it is an octagonal kofun, as seen in imperial tombs, and is a top-class cremation burial mound with a magnificent horizontal-entry stone burial chamber. The person buried there is unknown, but in recent years the theory that it is the true tomb of the 42nd Emperor Mommu (died in 707) has gained considerable academic support (in the Meiji period, the Imperial Household Agency arbitrarily designated the Kurihara Tsukaana Kofun to the south as the tomb of Emperor Mommu). As present, the burial chamber is backfilled for preservation, and improvements were made to the tumulus, including the installation of drainage ditches, walking paths, and protective fences. It is about a 15-minute walk from Asuka Station on the Kintetsu Railway Yoshino Line.

== See also ==
- List of Historic Sites of Japan (Nara)
- Japanese imperial tombs
