= Hinokuma-dera =

Hinokuma-dera ruins
- 檜隈寺 (Japanese)
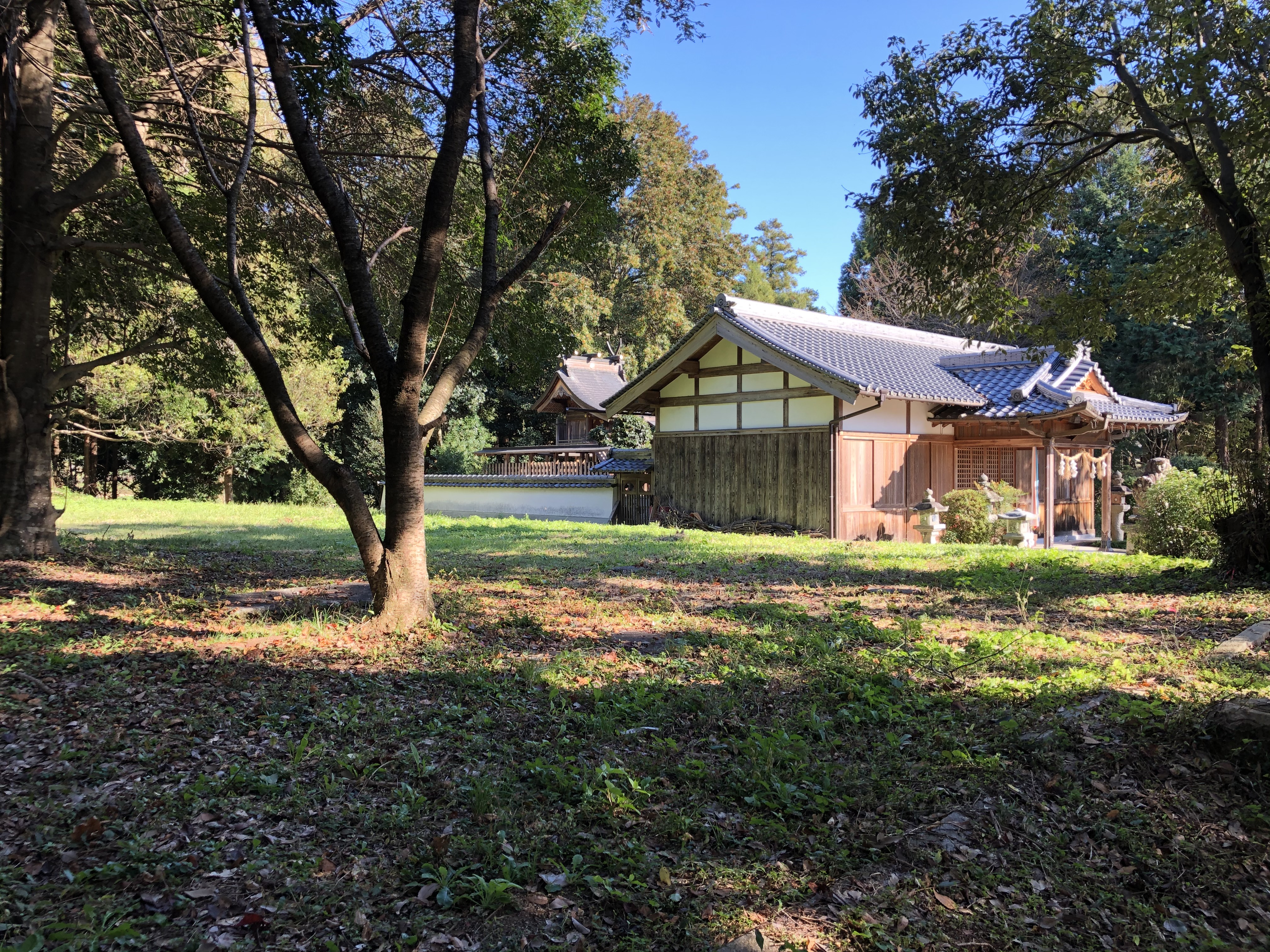
- Omiashi Jinja on the site of Hinokuma-dera

- Hinokuma-dera ruins Hinokuma-dera (Japan)
- Interactive map of Hinokuma-dera ruins
- 34°27′24.3″N 135°48′11.2″E
- Type: temple ruins
- Periods: Nara period
- Location: Asuka, Nara, Japan
- Region: Kansai region

History
- Built: c7th century AD

Site notes
- Public access: Yes

Hinokuma-dera ruins (檜隈寺, Hinokuma-dera ato) is an archaeological site with the ruins of an Asuka period Buddhist temple located in the village of Asuka, Nara, Japan. It was designated as a National Historic Site in 2003. The site is currently occupied by a Shinto shrine, the Omiashi Jinja (於美阿志神社).

== History ==
In the Kofun period, the area around Hinokuma, south of the Takamatsuzuka Kofun was the territory of the Yamato no Aya clan, a powerful toraijin clan from Baekje or Mimana in the Korean Peninsula. The clan is mentioned in both in Nihon Shoki and Kojiki as specializing in architecture and carpentry. It was also heavily militarized, often guarding and protecting high-ranking members of the Soga clan who also had deep connections with the Korean peninsula, specifically the kingdom of Baekje.

The first written mention of the temple is in the Nihon Shoki, in an entry for August 686, which states, "100 households were granted title to Hinokuma-dera, Karu-dera, and Okubo-dera for a period of 30 years." This indicates that Hinokuma-dera existed in 686, but this is the only time the temple's name appears in an official history. The temple's legend states that its location was the site of the palace of Achi no omi, the founder of the Yamato no Aya clan, who came to Japan in 289 AD. By the Kamakura period, the temple was apparently called Dōkō-ji (道興寺), and is mentioned in the "Kiyomizu-dera Engi" (The Origin of Kiyomizu-dera Temple). In 1908 , a temple bell with the date of Eishō 10 (1513) was excavated in Nakagawachi-gun, Osaka Prefecture, and it has the words "Hime-go, Takaichi-gun, Yamato Province" and "Holy Dōkō-ji Temple Bell," which shows that Dōkō-ji was still in existence at that time.

In Motoori Norinaga's "Sugegasa Nikki" from 1772, he described that the temple had been reduced to a dilapidated hermitage, with old roof tiles scattered around the grounds. The temple was abandoned sometime afterwards. All that remains at present is an eleven-story stone pagoda (missing the upper part) from the Heian period, which is designated an Important Cultural Property.

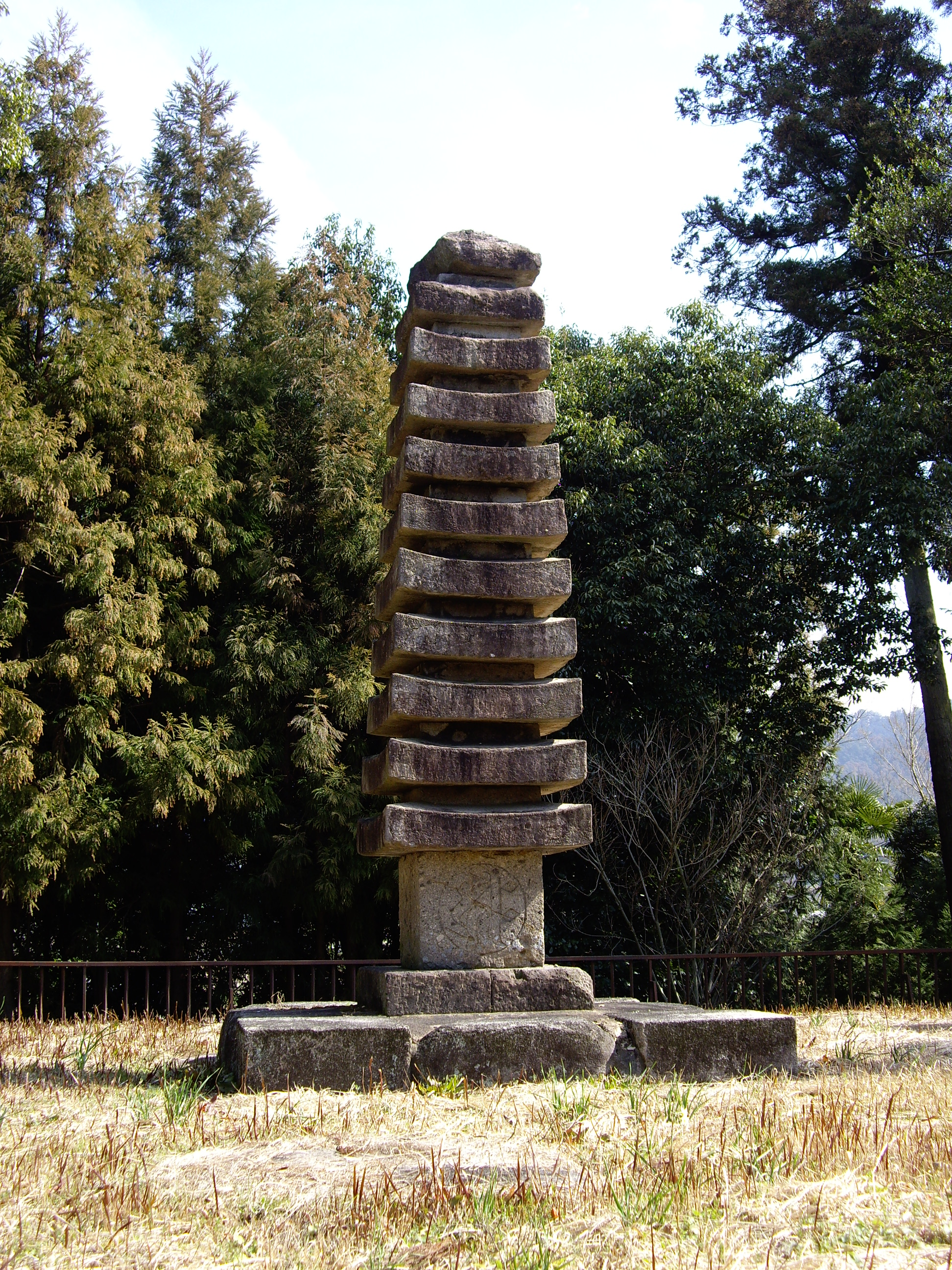
12-story pagoda at Hinokuma-dera ruins (ICP)

Four archaeological excavations have been carried out on the temple site since 1969. As a result, it was found that the layout of the temple buildingsis unique, with the central axis tilted westward, the Main Hall to the south and the Lecture Hall to the north of the Pagoda, and the Middle Gate located on the west. The earthen platform located south of the pagoda site was thought to be the site of the middle gate before the excavation, but in fact it is the site of a three-bay, four-sided Buddhist hall, and the cornerstone building located to the west of the pagoda is thought to be the middle gate based on its location and size. The main part of the temple complex was surrounded by a corridor, with the inner gate on the west side of the corridor, the Main Hall on the south side, and the Lecture Hall on the north side, and the Pagoda on the east side of the corridor. The significance of this unusual layout of the temple complex is thought to be due to the constraints of the terrain, as it is located on a hilly area. The remains of the temple are well preserved, with the core stone and all four foundation stones of the four main pillars remaining at the site of the Pagoda, and the tiled foundation remaining at the site of the Lecture Hall

The site is about a 20-minute walk from Asuka Station on the Kintetsu Railway Yoshino Line.

== See also ==
- List of Historic Sites of Japan (Nara)
