= Marukoyama Kofun =

Kofun period burial mound in Japan

- マルコ山古墳 (Japanese)
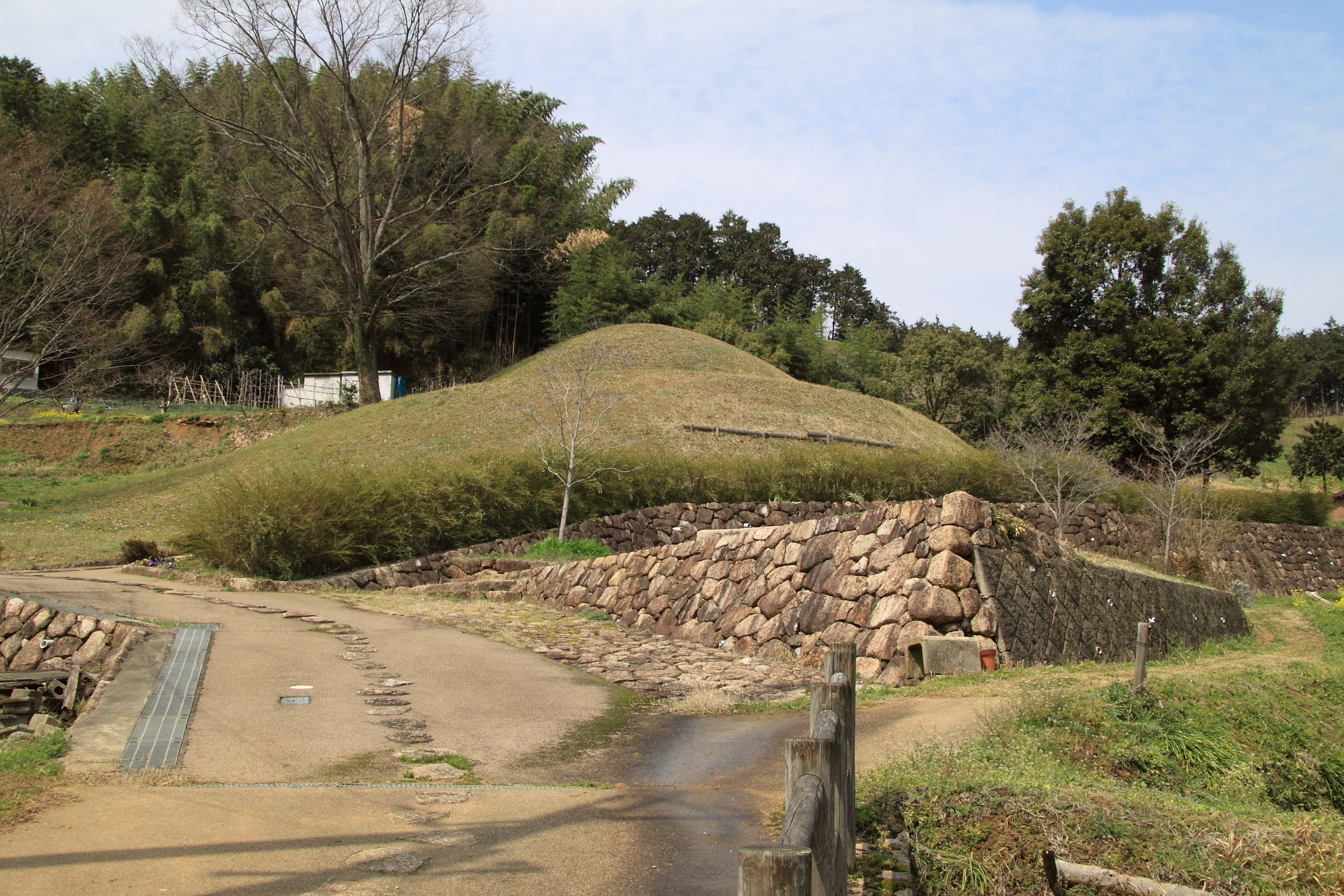
- Marukoyama Kofun

- Marukoyama Kofun Marukoyama Kofun (Japan)
- Interactive map of Marukoyama Kofun
- 34°26′37.85″N 135°46′28.4″E
- Type: Kofun
- Periods: Kofun period
- Location: Asuka, Nara, Japan
- Region: Kansai region

History
- Built: c.7th-8th century

Site notes
- Public access: Yes (no facilities)

Marukoyama Kofun (マルコ山古墳) is a burial mound, located in the Mayumi neighborhood of the village of Asuka, Nara prefecture in the Kansai region of Japan. It was designated a National Historic Site of Japan in 1982.

== Overview ==
The Marukoyama Kofun is located in the southern end of the Mayumi Hills, which spread across the western part of Asuka Village, and is surrounded by other tombs from the end of the Kofun period, such as Takamatsuzuka Kofun and Kengoshizuka Kofun. The tumulus was built on a flattened out area on the southern slope of a ridge running east-to-west, and has a diameter of 15 meters and height of 5.3 meters. Archaeological excavations were carried out in 1977 and 1978, revealing that the tumulus was built in two tiers, and although previously regarded as an enpun (円墳)-style circular tumulus, was in fact a rare hexagonal rokkaku-fun (六角墳). Furthermore, the tumulus contained a stone burial chamber made of cut tuff stones orientated to the south. The interior walls, including the floor, are covered with plaster, which has a similar structure to the Takamatsuzuka Kofun and Kitora Kofun. The ceiling is carved into a roof shape, which is also similar to the Kitora Kofun; however, no murals were found. Excavated artifacts include fragments of a lacquered wooden coffin, copper nails, iron nails, and gilt bronze coffin ornaments, as well as a gilt bronze sword fitting as a grave goods. Human bones of a man believed to be in his 30s were also found, The identity of the buried person is unknown, but it is almost certain that it was a member of the imperial family, possibly a son of Emperor Tenchi. Based on the shape of the burial chamber and the excavated remains, the tumulus is thought to date from the late 7th century to the early 8th century.

The tumulus is about a 15-minute walk from Asuka Station on the Kintetsu Railway Yoshino Line.

== See also ==
- List of Historic Sites of Japan (Nara)
