= Kawara-dera =

Buddhist temple in Asuka, Nara, Japan

- 川原寺
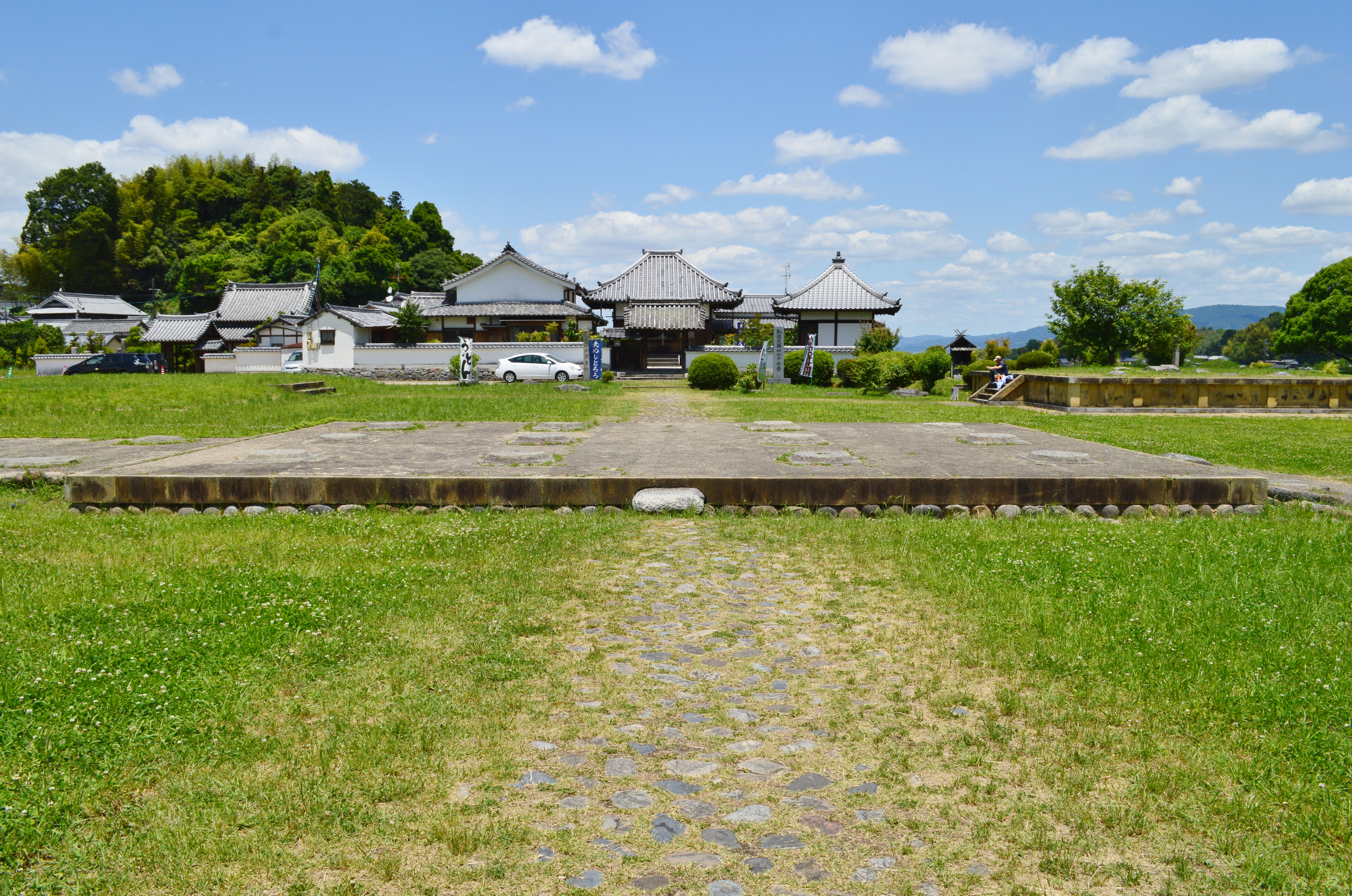
- Site of the Middle Gate of Kawara-dera (modern Gufukuji-ji in background)

- Location within Nara Prefecture Location within Japan

Religion
- Affiliation: Buddhist
- Status: ruins

Location
- Location: 1109 Kawahara Asuka-mura, Takaichi-gun, Nara-ken 634-014
- Country: Japan
- Interactive map of Kawara-dera
- Coordinates: 34°28′21.7″N 135°49′3.0″E

Architecture
- Completed: c.673

Website
- Official website
- National Historic Site }

Kawara-dera (川原寺) was a Buddhist temple established during the Asuka period in the village of Asuka, Nara Prefecture, Japan. Archaeological excavations have revealed a large-scale complex which included two Kondō, a pagoda, extensive priests' quarters, and roof tiles that are "among the most beautiful ever made in Japan". The site of the precincts has been protected as a designated a National Historic Site since 1921 and forms part of a grouping of sites submitted in 2007 for future inscription on the UNESCO World Heritage List: Asuka-Fujiwara: Archaeological sites of Japan’s Ancient Capitals and Related Properties. Related artefacts are displayed at the Asuka Historical Museum.

== Overview ==
Kawara-dera was ranked as one of the four great temples of Asuka, along with Asuka-dera, Yakushi-ji, and Daikan-daiji, and is thought to have been built during the reign of Emperor Tenchi in the mid-7th century; however, there is no mention of its founding in the Nihon Shoki. As a result, the time and circumstances of its founding have been debated for many years, leading to it being called the "mysterious great temple." When the capital was moved from Asuka to Heijō-kyō, the other three great temple were relocated but for unknown reasons Kawara-dera was left behind.

The entry for the 4th year of Hakuchi (653) in the Nihon Shoki states that "Upon the death of the monk Sōmin, many Buddhist statues were placed at Kawara-dera for memorial services," but the editor of the Nihon Shoki adds a note saying that "it may have been Yamada-dera, not Kawara-dera," which shows that this story was already unclear at the time the Nihon Shoki was compiled. The first confirmed appearance of Kawara-dera in historical documents is the entry for March of the 2nd year of Emperor Tenmu's reign (673) in the Nihon Shoki. According to this entry, "writers were gathered and the entire Buddhist canon was copied for the first time at Kawara-dera." This article is famous as the first mention of a project to copy all Buddhist scriptures in Japan, but the name Kawara-dera appears suddenly in this article, and the circumstances of its founding are not described. Therefore, several theories about the founding of Kawara-dera exist.

The Shōji Engishū states that the temple was founded in the 13th year of the reign of Emperor Bidatsu (584), but this is not supported by any archaeological evidence. If the description in the Nihon Shoki is to be believed, the prevailing theory is that Emperor Tenchi founded it on the site of Kawara-miya Palace, which was occupied by his mother, Empress Saimei (Empress Kōgyoku, re-enthroned). Kawara-miya Palace was a temporary palace used between the burning of Asuka Itabuki Palace in the first year of the reign of Emperor Saimei (655) and the move to Okamoto Palace the following year.

Excavations conducted from 1957 to 1959 revealed that Kawara-dera had a unique layout of one Japanese pagoda and two main halls. Cloisters extended from the left and right sides of the inner gate, and divide the center of the temple complex into a square, with the Central Main Hall (Chūkondō) located in the center of the northern side of the corridors. Within the area surrounded by the corridors, there is a five-story pagoda to the right (east) of the Chūkondō, and a Western Main Hall (Saikondō) to the west. This layout was similar to the Western Temple complex of Hōryū-ji, but the difference is that while the Hōryū-ji's Main Hall faces south, Kawara-dera's Western Kondō faces east, facing the pagoda. Furthermore, according to the results of the excavation, the three-by-two bay West Golden Hall was an open-air building (without any walls) with open eaves on all four sides. All of these buildings were later lost, and only the foundation stones remain.

It is noteworthy that the foundation stones of the Chūkondō are made of marble, which is unprecedented (temple state that they were made of agate, but this is incorrect). In addition, the roof tiles excavated from Kawara-dera from the time of its founding are of a complex design called "compound lotus pattern tiles," in which each of the eight petals is divided into two, and this became the mainstream tile design thereafter.

Per Kujō Kanezane's diary "Gyokuyo", Kawara-dera burned down in 1191. In addition, a historical document from 1070, "Ōmi Province Gufukuji Land Manor Report," states that documents related to the manor were burned in a fire at Kawara-dera, suggesting that the temple was burned down several times. It was rebuilt once during the Kamakura period, but never regained its former strength. It is believed that it was abandoned without being rebuilt after it was burned down again by lightning at the end of the Muromachi period. The temple of Gufuku-ji (弘福寺) was then built on the site of the Chūkondō in the mid-Edo period, and remains to this day.

In 1974, several hundred pieces of clay statues and brick Buddhas were excavated from Itafuchi Shrine on the mountain behind Kawara-dera. These bricks, which were embossed triad Buddhas, measured about 20-centimeters in length and width. There has been no other case in Japan where such a large number of bricks with an embossed Buddha design have been excavated from a single location, and although their purpose is unclear, the prevailing theory is that they filled the walls of the Buddhist hall.

The Kawara-dera site has now been developed so that the former locations of the Great South Gate, Middle Gate, corridors and other features can be seen. The current Gufuku-ji is home to wooden standing statues of Jikoku-ten and Tamon-ten (early Heian period), which are designated National Important Cultural Properties.

== Gallery ==
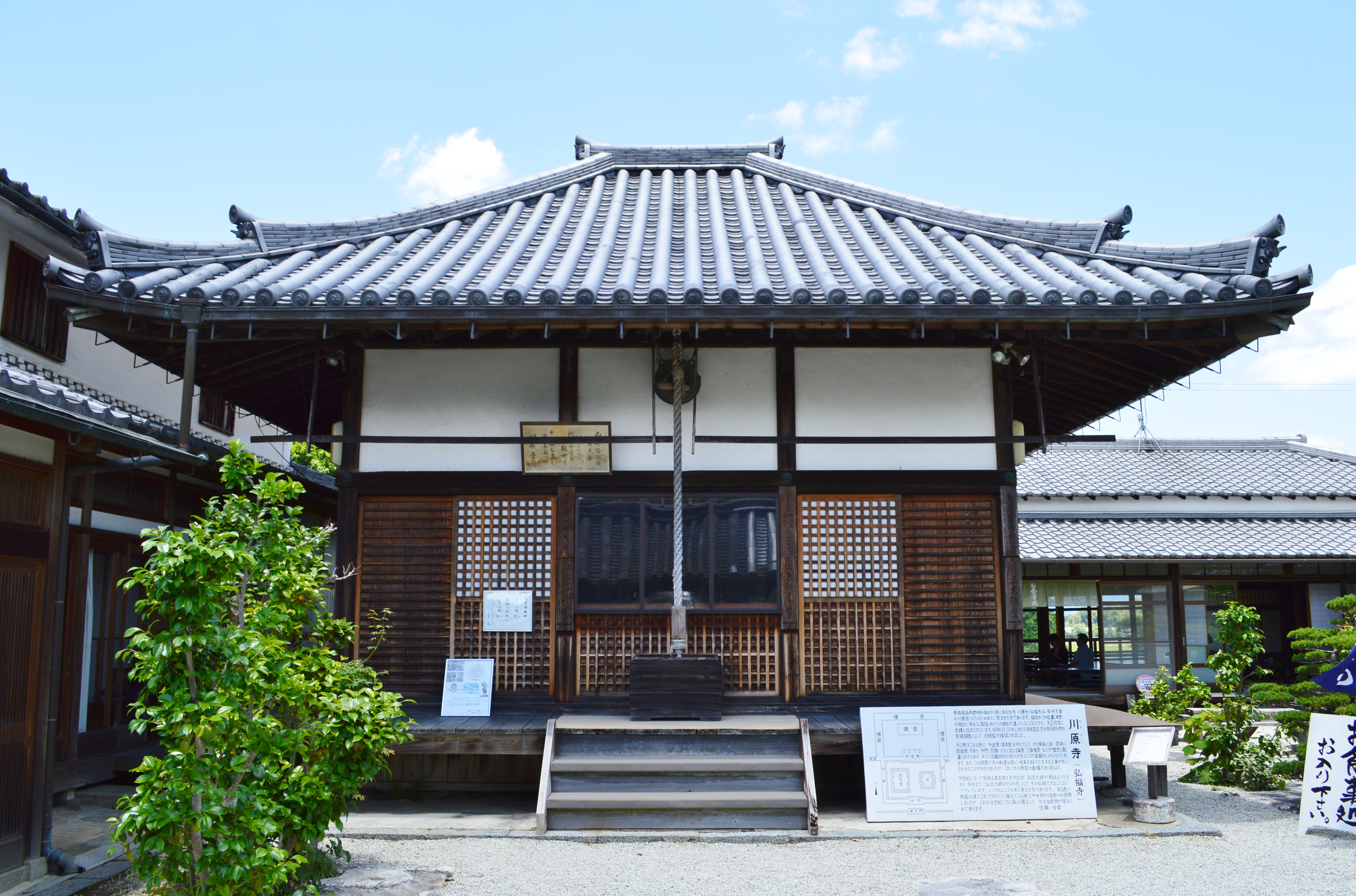
Gufuku-ji Hondo

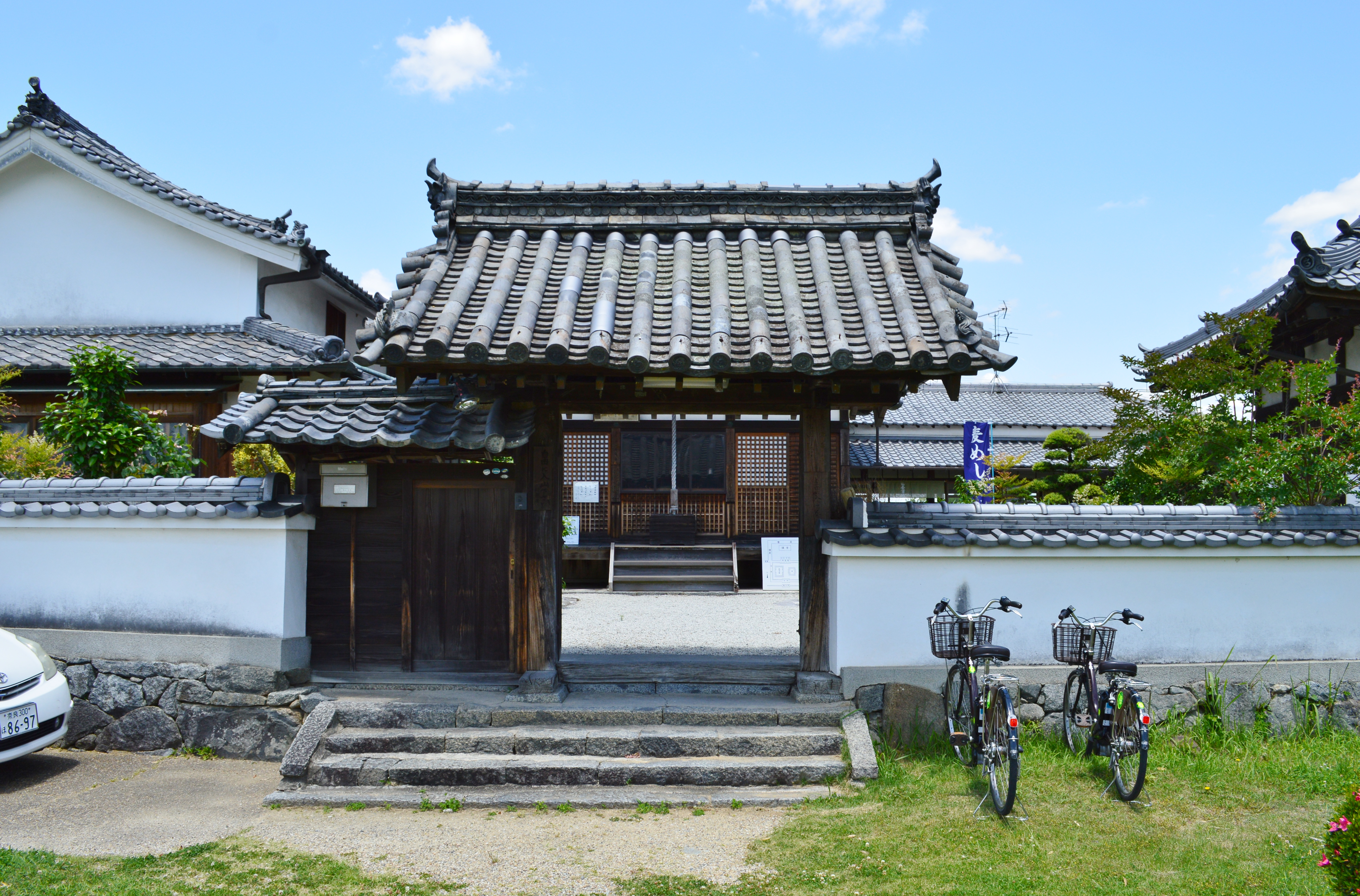
Gufuku-ji Sanmon

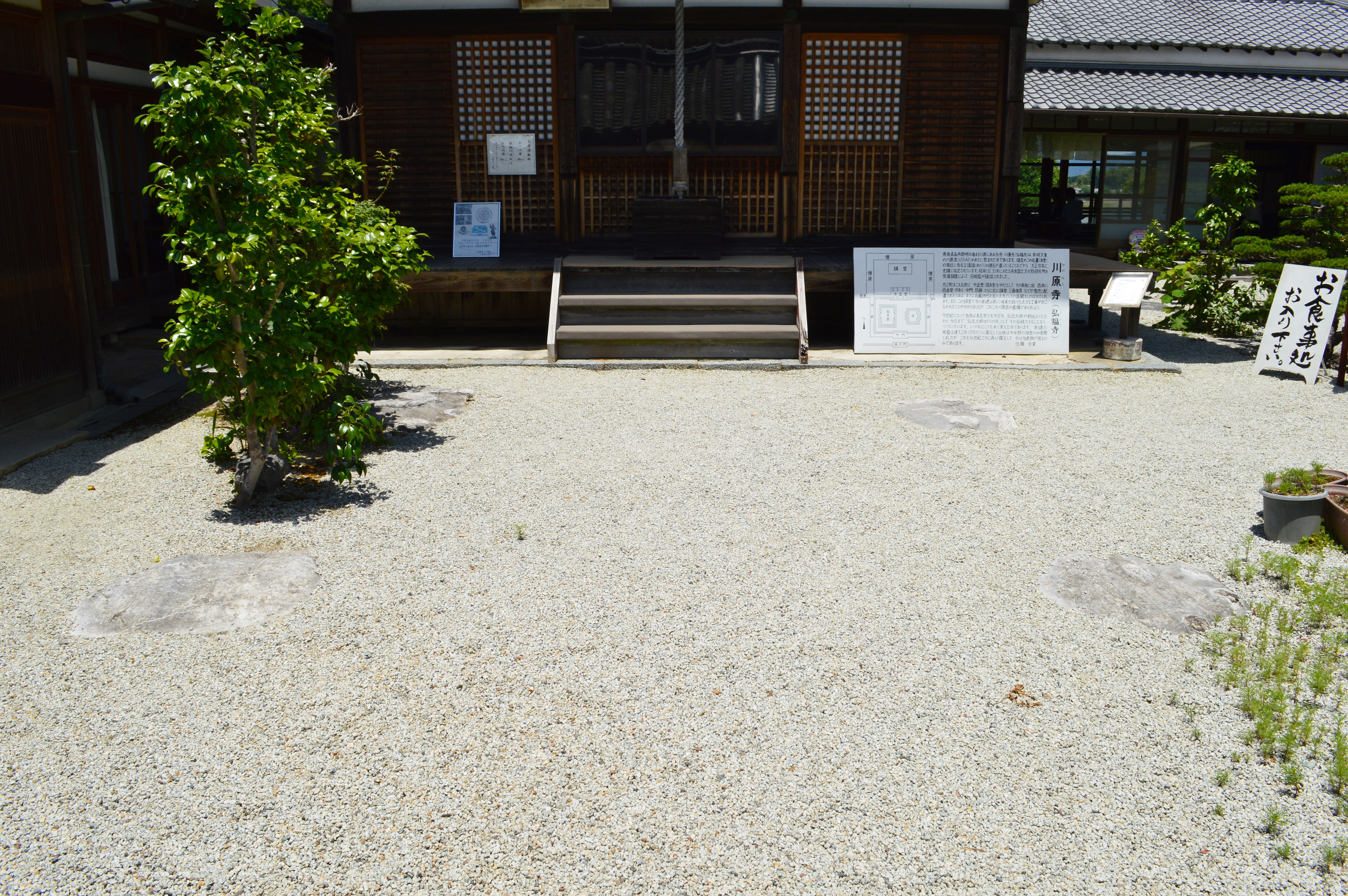
Kawara-dera Chūkondō ruins

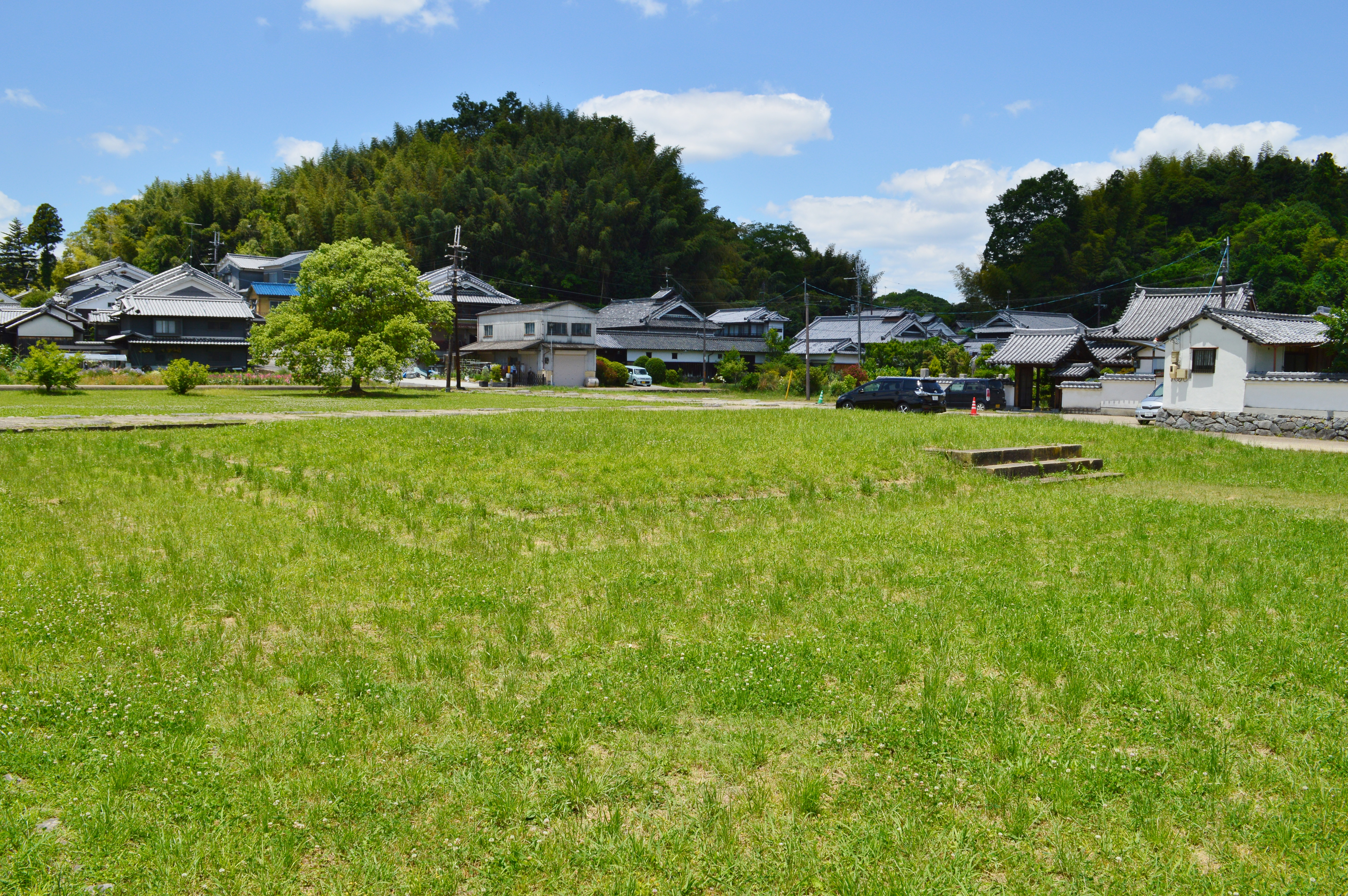
Kawara-dera Saikondō ruins

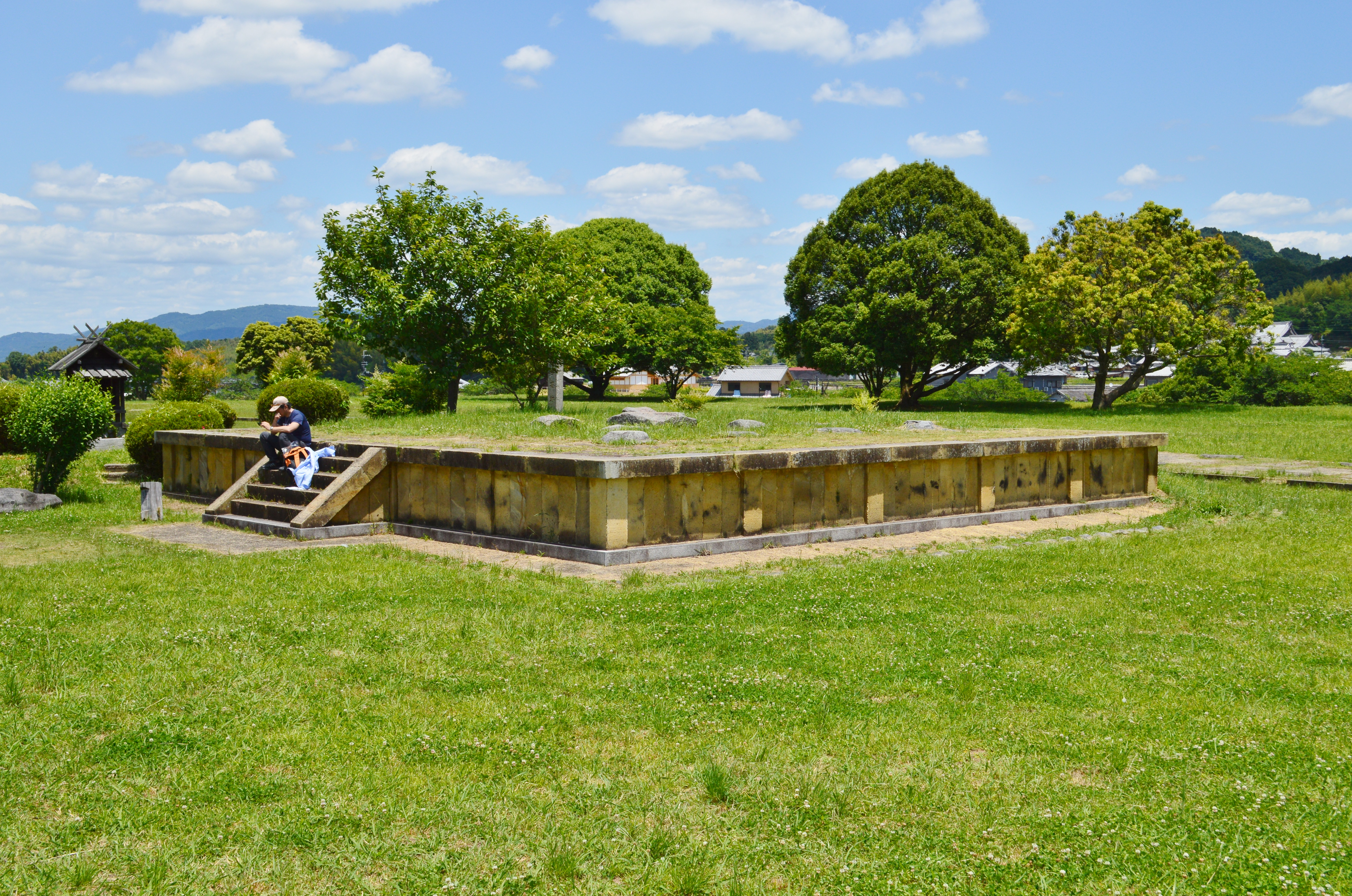
Kawara-dera Pagoda ruins

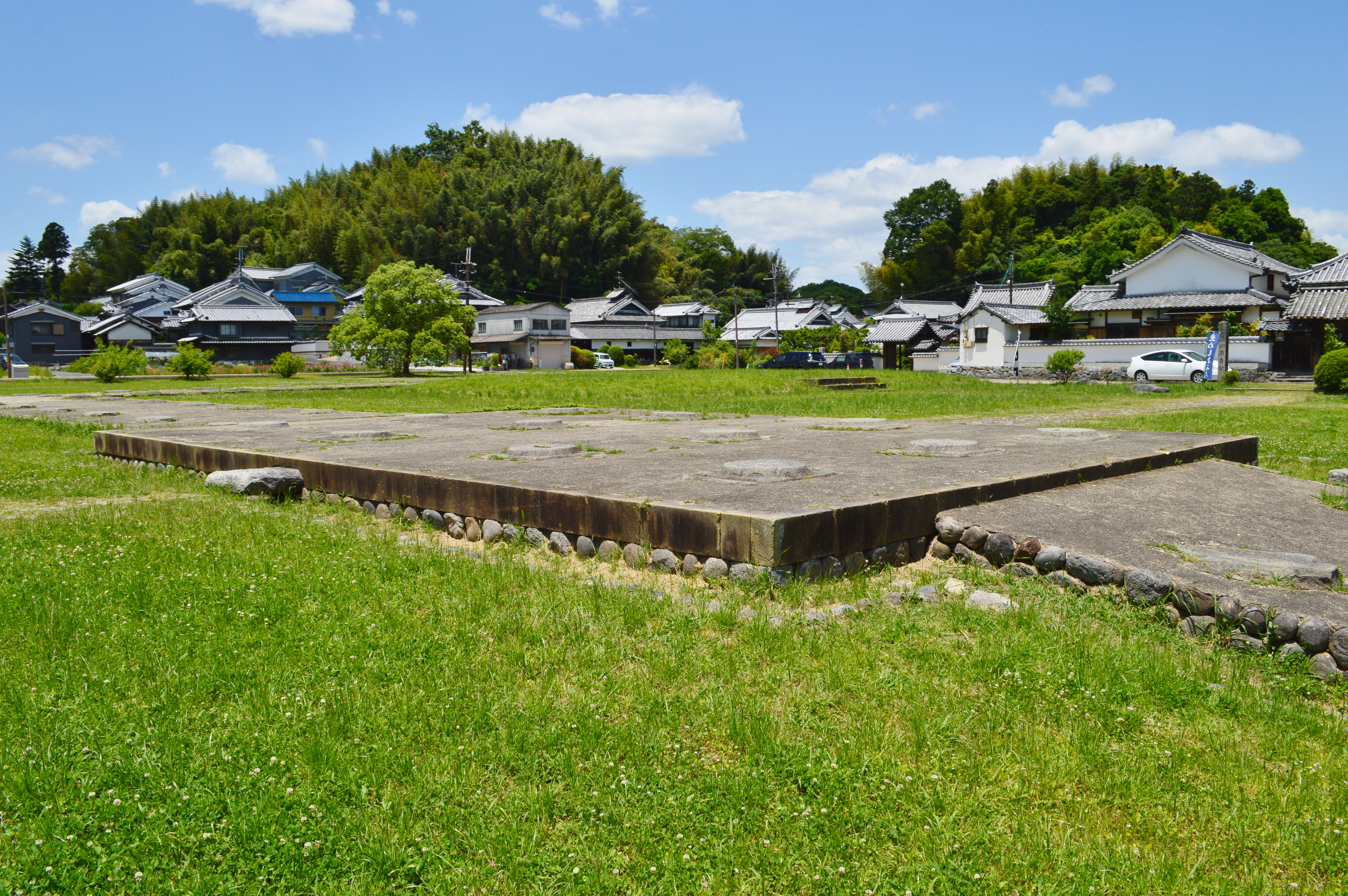
Kawara-dera Middle Gate ruins

Kawara-dera South Gate ruins

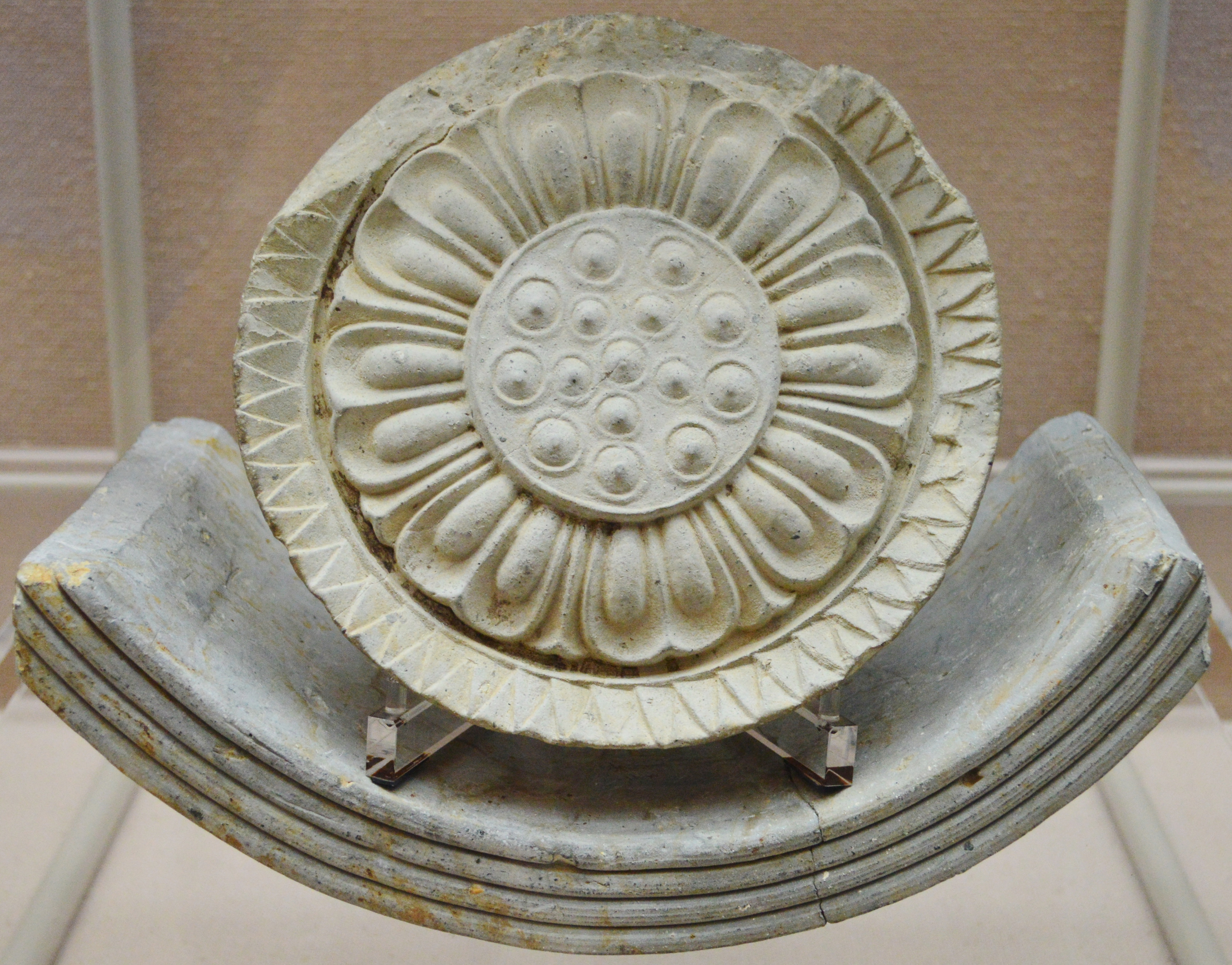
Roof tiles from Kawara-dera

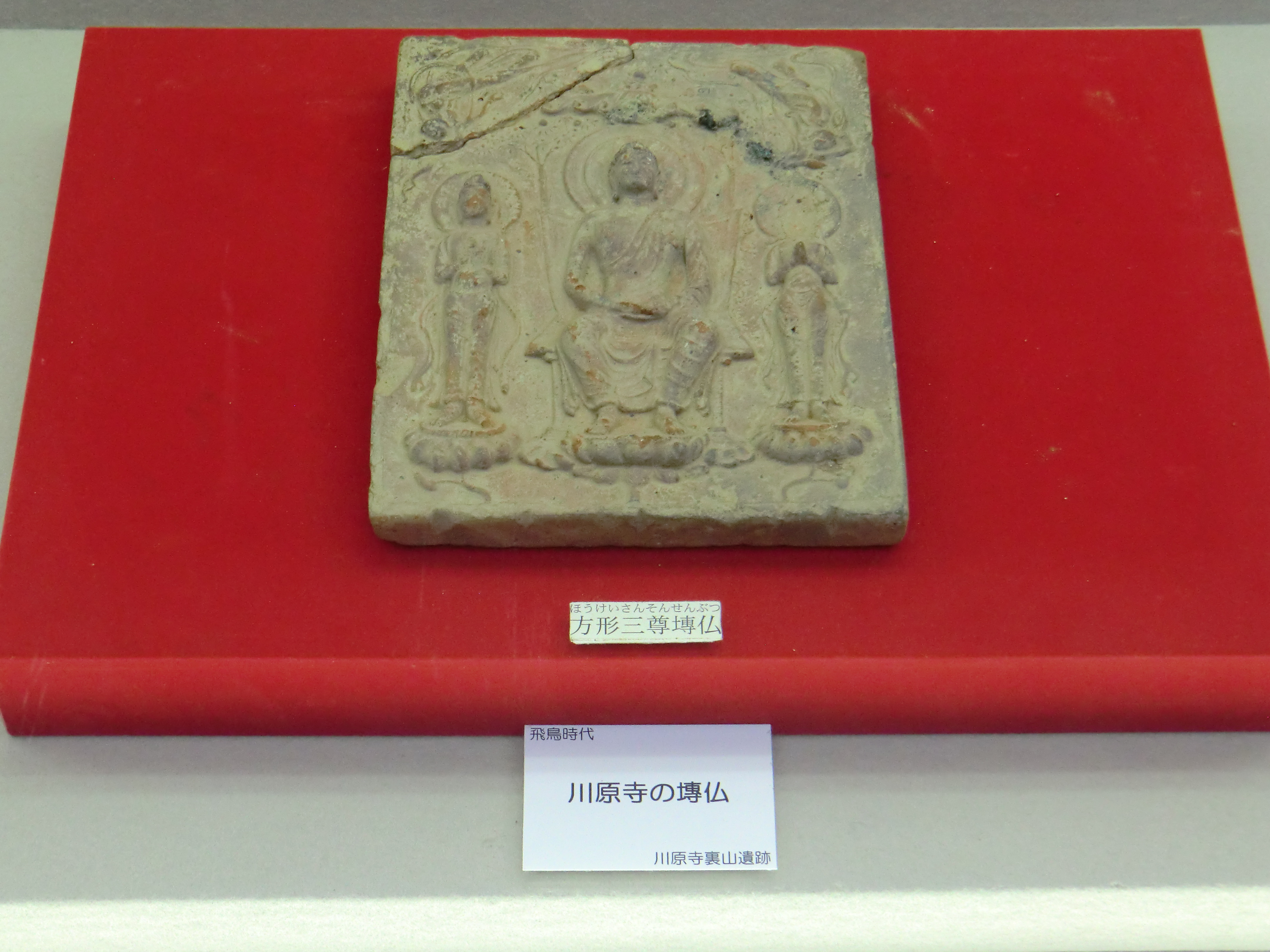
Embossed Buddha brick from Itafuchi Shrine

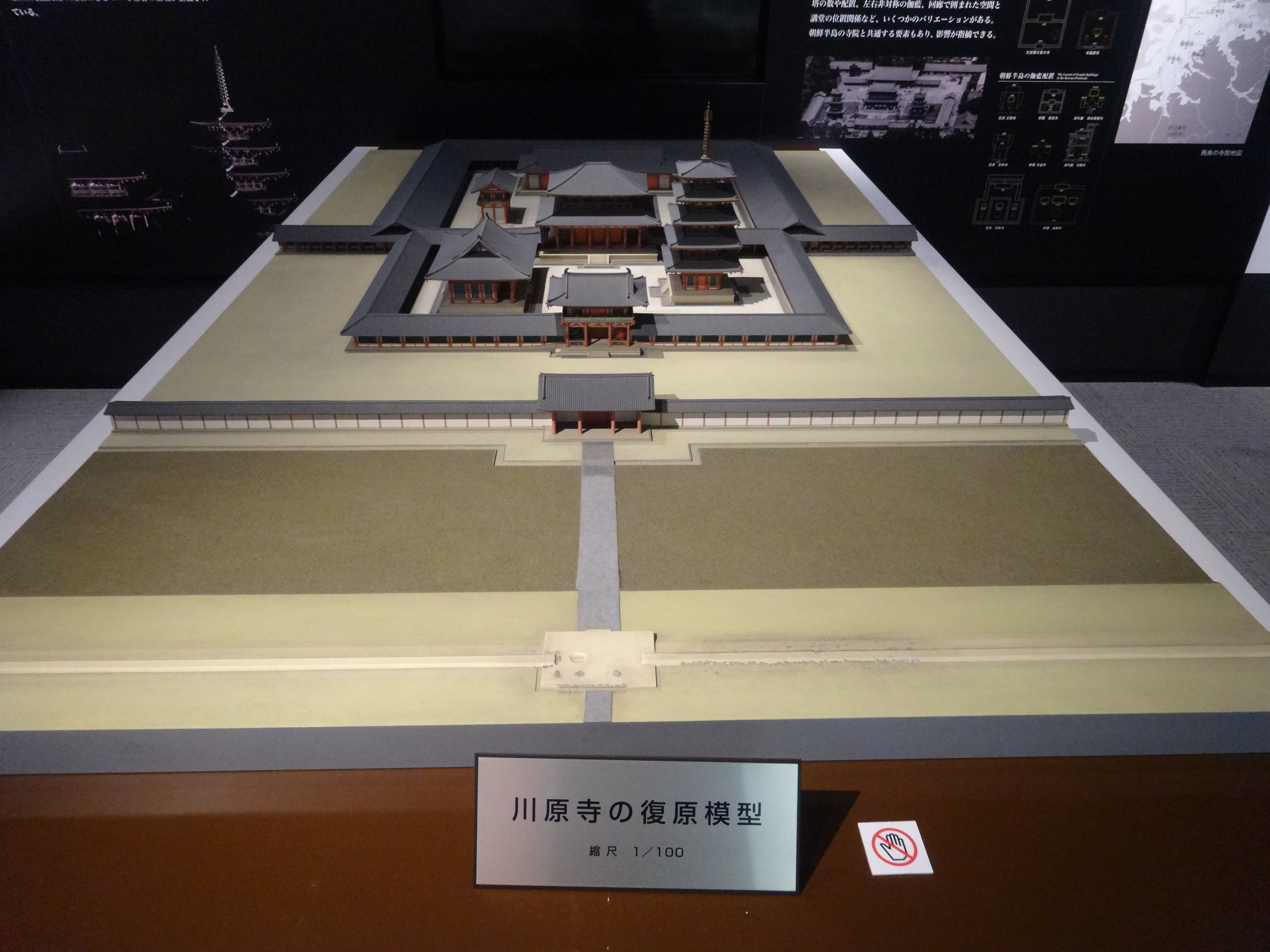
Model of Kawara-dera
Asuka Historical Museum

== See also ==
- Asuka-Fujiwara
- List of Historic Sites of Japan (Nara)
