= Jōrin-ji =

Asuka period Buddhist temple ruins

Jōrin-ji temple ruins
- 定林寺跡 (Japanese)
- Jōrin-ji Jōrin-ji (Japan)
- Interactive map of Jōrin-ji temple ruins
- 34°28′01″N 135°48′46″E
- Type: temple ruins
- Periods: Asuka period
- Location: Asuka, Nara, Japan
- Region: Kansai region

Site notes
- Public access: Yes

The Jōrin-ji temple ruins (定林寺跡, Jōrin-ji ato), is an archaeological site with the ruins of an Asuka period Buddhist temple located in the Tachibe neighborhood of the village of Asuka, Nara, Japan. The temple no longer exists, but its ruins were designated as a National Historic Site in 1966, with the area under protection expanded in 1993.

== Overview ==
Also known as Tachibe-dera (立部寺), the ruins are located in at the eastern end of the Hinokuma region, an area of intricate hills and valleys, on a hill about 400 meters southeast of the tombs of Emperor Tenmu and Empress Jitō. The central temple complex is built on a relatively wide flat area at the western end of the hill, and it is in a unique location facing deep valleys to the south, west, and north. According to temple legends, it is one of the 46 temples built by Prince Shōtoku, but the no details of its foundation or subsequent history of this temple are known. From the location, it is probable that the temple was a clan temple for toraijin immigrants from the Korean Peninsula who had settled in this area. Archaeological excavations have been conducted three times since 1953, uncovering the remains of the foundations of a pagoda, with its underground core stone and a high earthen platform thought to be the remains of the Main Hall or lecture hall. The temple appears to existed into the Kamakura period, and earthworks that were thought to be part of the south-facing corridor built in the Kamakura period were also found. Other artifacts included fragments of clay statue of a bodhisattva and roof tile fragments with plain lotus pattern from the Asuka period. Currently, a modern temple and a Kasuga Shrine occupy parts of the site.

== See also ==
- List of Historic Sites of Japan (Nara)
