= Takashi Inukai =

Professor and scholar of Japanese literature

Takashi Inukai (犬養 孝, Inukai Takashi; April 1, 1907 – October 3, 1998) was professor emeritus at Osaka University and Kōnan Women's University, and a noted scholar of Japanese literature and especially the Man'yōshū poetry. He earned his bachelor's degree in Japanese literature from the University of Tokyo in 1932, as well as its Ph.D. in 1962. He received the Order of the Rising Sun, Gold Rays with Neck Ribbon from the Japanese Government in 1978. He was qualified as a Person of Cultural Merit in 1987. Upon his death, the Order of the Sacred Treasure, Gold and Silver Star, was posthumously conferred on him.

After graduating from the Faculty of Letters at the University of Tokyo, Inukai Takashi taught at Taipei High School, where he served as the homeroom teacher for students such as Koo Kuan-min(辜寬敏) and Takeuchi Akihiro(竹內昭太郎).

During his time at Taipei High School (officially known as Taiwan Governor-General's Taipei Senior High School(臺灣總督府臺北高等學校)), Inukai captivated many students with his unique "Inukai melody" while reciting the *Man'yōshū* (萬葉集). Students like Huang Bo-chao(黃伯超, Koo Kuan-min(辜寬敏), and Wu Jiantang(吳建堂) (pen name: 孤蓬萬里) were so enchanted by it that they continued to recite *Man'yōshū* (萬葉集) using the "Inukai melody" (犬養節) even into their old age (around 2023). In addition, he mentored future luminaries such as Dr. Wu Jiantang(吳建堂) (pen name: 孤蓬萬里), who later became a renowned physician. In 1996, Dr. Wu received the prestigious Kikuchi Kan Prize in Japan for his book *Taiwan Man'yōshū*.

When he was a professor of Osaka University, he walked around with his students the places where each verse of the Man'yōshū was composed, in order to help them understand the essences of the Man'yōshū more deeply. His idea impressed the students very much, and they went for more than 250 trips all over the country for almost 50 years, until he died in 1998. The total number of participants of those Osaka University Man'yo trips reached more than 40,000.

In addition to teaching his students, he helped the people be more familiar with the Man'yōshū. Countless of people was attracted by the Man'yōshū thanks to his activities. He gave a lecture on Man'yōshū to Emperor Shōwa on the top of a hill in Asuka, Nara, on December 4, 1979.

Inukai Man'yō Memorial Hall in Asuka, Nara Prefecture is dedicated to Inukai.
