= Asuka Inabuchi Palace Site =

Coordinates: 34°27′47″N 135°49′20″E

- 飛鳥稲淵宮殿跡 (Japanese)
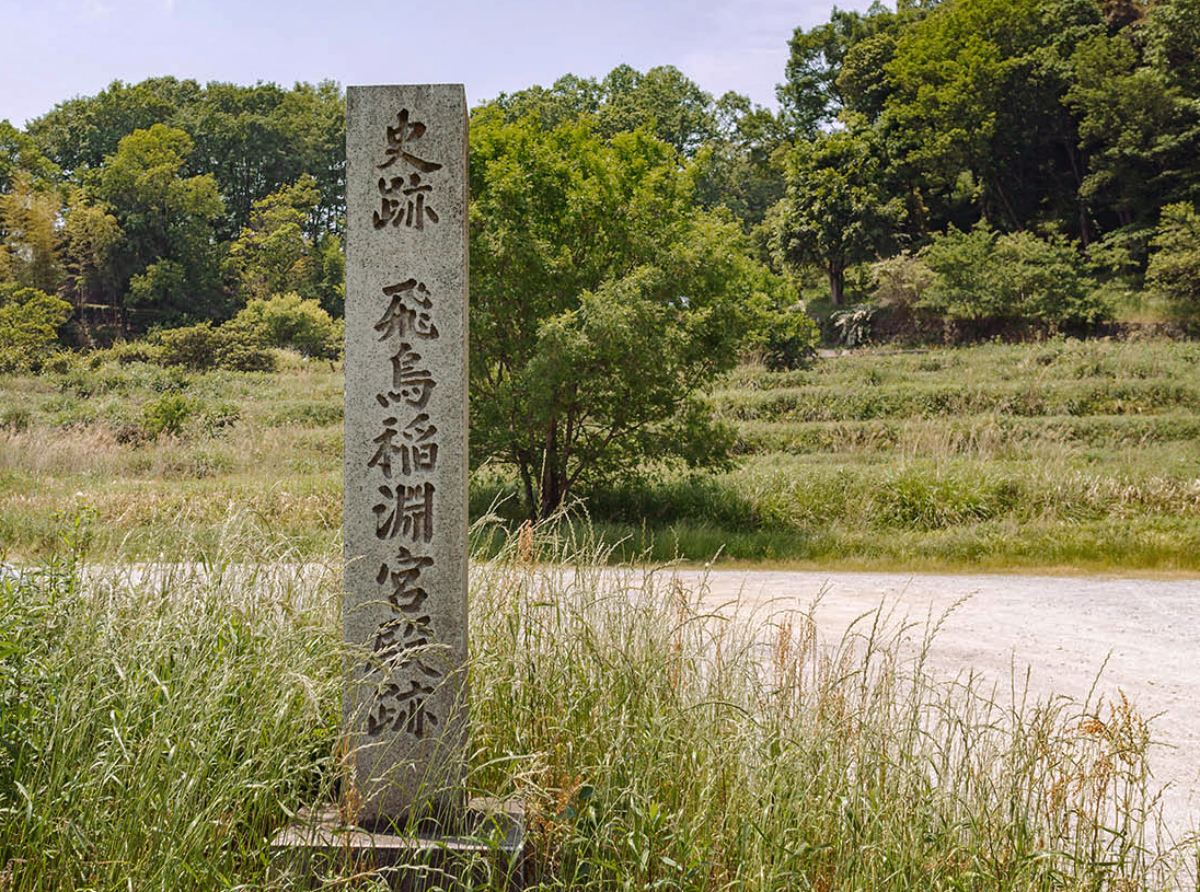
- Asuka Inabuchi Palace Site

- Asuka Inabuchi Palace Site Asuka Inabuchi Palace Site (Japan)
- Type: settlement trace
- Periods: Asuka period
- Location: Asuka, Nara, Japan
- Region: Kansai region

History
- Built: c.7th century

Site notes
- Public access: Yes
- Special National Historic Site of Japan

Asuka Inabuchi Palace Site (飛鳥稲淵宮殿跡, Asuka Inabuchi-kyūden ato) is an archaeological site with the remains of an Asuka period palace, located in the Inabuchi neighborhood of the village of Asuka, Nara in the Kansai region of Japan. Its ruins were designated a National Historic Site of Japan in 1979 with the area under protection expanded in 1981.

== Overview ==
Asuka Inabuchi Palace Site is located in flat rice paddies on the left bank of the Inabuchi River, upstream of the Asuka River and about 400 meters south of the Ishibutai Kofun During the construction of a parking lot in 1976 in the Iwaido area of the National Asuka Historical Park, the traces of the foundations for a U-shaped palace complex built in the late 7th century were uncovered. Archaeological excavations were conducted by the Nara National Research Institute for Cultural Properties in 1976 and 1977 and found that the site was approximately 170 meters north-to-south and approximately 60 meters east-to-west. The main remains are four post-hole foundation buildings, two east-west buildings and two north-south buildings, and the stone paving between the buildings.

The east-west buildings are located in the center of the excavation site and are large buildings measuring more than five bays east-to-west and more than four bays north-to-south. The two north-south buildings are located about four meters apart to the east. All of these buildings were clearly constructed with great planning, with the buildings spaced at equal intervals. Based on the scale and layout, the palace itself should have been a four-sided building with nine bays (total length 24.6 meters from east-to-west) and four bays (total length 10.2 meters from north-to-south), while the east-west buildings to the north would be a building with a south-facing wing, 14 bays (total length 24.6 meters) and four bays (8.8 meters). The two north-south buildings to the east would be a building with a west-facing wing, 4 bays (8.8 meters) and 15 bays (26.4 meters). From this reconstruction, it can be inferred that there was mostly likely a north-south building on the west side similar to the two on the east side, and if the central building with four roofs is the main hall, the building to the north of that is the rear hall, and the north-south buildings on the east and west are side halls, then it is possible to surmise that the buildings were arranged in an orderly manner with east-west symmetry. Excavated pottery and other items indicate that the buildings were constructed in the mid-7th century, and were destroyed by fire at the end of the same century. No roof tiles have been excavated. The stone paving surfaces between the buildings like those at the ruins of Asuka Itabuki Palace and the Miyataki Site, and the layout of the buildings is similar to that of the Ikaruga Palace ruins.

It is known what this palace structure was, but the prevailing theory is that these ruins correspond to the "Asuka Kawabe no Karimiya" where Prince Naka no Ōe (later Emperor Tenchi) returned from Naniwa-kyō to Asuka Palace in 653 during the reign of Emperor Kotoku, as described in the "Nihon Shoki" .

== See also ==
- List of Historic Sites of Japan (Nara)
