= Detachment of wall paintings =

Process for removal of wall paintings

The detachment of wall paintings involves the removal of a wall painting from the structure of which it formed part. While detachment was once a common practice, the preservation of art in situ is now preferred, and detachment is now largely restricted to cases where the only alternative is total loss. According to the International Council on Monuments and Sites (ICOMOS):

Detachment and transfer are dangerous, drastic and irreversible operations that severely affect the physical composition, material structure and aesthetic characteristics of wall paintings. These operations are, therefore, only justifiable in extreme cases when all options of in situ treatment are not viable. Should such situations occur, decisions involving detachment and transfer should always be taken by a team of professionals, rather than by the individual who is carrying out the conservation work. Detached paintings should be replaced in their original location whenever possible. Special measures should be taken for the protection and maintenance of detached paintings, and for the prevention of their theft and dispersion. The application of a covering layer concealing an existing decoration, carried out with the intention of preventing damage or destruction by exposure to an inhospitable environment, should be executed with materials compatible with the wall painting, and in a way that will permit future uncovering.

== History ==
Vitruvius records how in Sparta, in 59 BC, "paintings have been taken out of certain walls by cutting through the bricks, enclosed in wooden frames, and brought to the Comitium". A century later, apprised of paintings of Atalanta and Helen without drapery and "enflamed with lust", Caligula attempted to carry them off, but was prevented by the makeup of the plaster. Maiuri cites examples of wall paintings in wooden frames excavated at Pompeii, a precursor to what was to follow in the 18th and 19th centuries. The practice of detachment, in abeyance or undocumented for a millennium, was revived in Renaissance Italy, with several instances recorded by Vasari.

Some of the earliest wall paintings date to 16,000 BCE in the Lascaux Caves in France. Wall paintings historically differ from wall murals due to wall paintings being put on structurally significant walls, as murals are in dedicated wall niches. Some early accounts of wall painting detachment come from the expeditions of Napoleon Bonaparte. Prior to the Napoleonic Expeditions in the early 1700s chemists and architects from around Europe began working with both the strappo and stacco methods of detachment. It was the method of stacco Napoleon's team of artists and architects used in order to remove Daniele da Volterra's Deposition. Although detachment is possible it is favorably viewed as a last resort when other methods of preservation have failed. Typically the largest threat to wall paintings is moisture behind the work; if this is corrected, detachment is typically no longer necessary. In more recent years the artist Banksy has become world renown for their street art. This rise in popularity of the artist has resulted in the removal of their paintings to be sold. One example can be seen in the removal of Girl with Red Balloon from Shoreditch, east London in 2013–2014. The painting was removed over a period of two weeks, using a diamond-bladed chainsaw to cut through 22 cm of brick. The detached work went on to sell for £350,000 in an auction.

== Motivation ==
In their study, Mora, Mora, and Philippot cite four reasons for the "over-use" of detachment: the 19th-century division of the arts that privileged a "painting" divorced from its architectural and historical context; insensitivity to the aesthetic consequences, often partially concealed by restorers; the curiosity of art historians looking for sinopie; or perceived savings relating to the initial cost of treatment. Commercial gain and exploitation as consumer goods by collectors, dealers and restorers provides another possible incentive. This process enables nowadays' companies to offer their customers an authentic fresco, created in their laboratory according to the ancient technique and transferred onto a canvas to be shipped to the place of installation.

== Techniques ==
There are three main methods, typically referred to by their Italian terms, namely stacco a massello, involving detachment and removal of painting, render, and some or all of the mural support; stacco or detachment of the painting with render alone; and strappo, lit. "tearing", lifting of only the paint layer, attached to a facing with adhesive. In each case the resulting material must be applied to a new support.

Schwartzbaum et al. liken the removal of a fresco to the transfer of a panel painting, in that it is generally considered undesirable except as a last resort. "Strappo" involves the removal of only the uppermost pigment-bearing layer; "stacco" is the removal of the fresco and its plaster preparation; "stacco a massello" is the removal of the painting, preparation, and mural support. It is generally desirable to remove as much of the preparation as possible in order to preserve the original character of the wall, yet "Stacco a massello is often prohibitively expensive."

According to the Benozzo Gozzoli Museum, Castelfiorentino, Italy, the "Strappo" technique is the least invasive method of wall painting removal because unlike stacco a massello or stacco, it "involves removal of only the topmost layer of plaster, which has absorbed the pigment" as described in the video, The Strappo Technique produced by the Museo Benozzo Gozzoli.

This video details removal by the strappo method, in which the overlaying painted surface is first coated with a thin layer of cotton cloth and animal glue. Following is a secondary and sturdier layer of cloth extending beyond the perimeter of the work and the outline of the fresco is incised. The entire surface of the painting and protective cloth are then detached from the subsurface by means of pouncing with a rubber mallet, and the fresco and cloth layer are both carefully removed from its support from the bottom up. A new backing layer is then applied to the exposed reverse of the fresco, called velatini, followed by two additional layers of mortar (one rough and another smooth). The two layers of cloth are known as the "sacrficial" or "sacrificial leg", because they serve only to facilitate future detachments and are hence, reversible. The detached painting is then secured to a rigid support and the protective covering removed with a solution of "hot water spray and decolored ethyl alcohol" – exposing the original painted surface to the gaze of the viewer.

=== Case study ===
==== Salvaging the Frescos at the Church of San Lorenzo, Fruli Region, Italy: ====
The following narrative describes extreme circumstances under which removal of wall paintings is mandated. Due to a series of strong earthquakes in the Fruili Region of Italy in 1976, the structure of the Church of San Lorenzo was compromised, posing a severe threat to the integrity of its wall paintings. Under these rare circumstances, detachment was considered as a last resort. Destruction was documented as follows:

"After the May 6th earthquake, the roof and upper portions of the nave of the Church of San Lorenzo collapsed. Plaster fell from the remaining walls, revealing traces of a previously unknown eleventh century fresco cycle, unique in the Friuli…Furthermore, the edge of the cliff on which the church was situated had moved to within inches of the left nave wall as a result of earthquake-related landslides. The probability of complete loss of the left wall with further landslides required the immediate removal of its frescoes. However, since the thin, well-adhered preparations of the frescoes precluded "stacco" or "strappo", the only alternative was a "stacco a massello", the removal of the painting, preparation, and masonary support as a complete unit."

== Criticisms ==
Minimum intervention and reversibility are core conservation ethics that favor preservation in situ. Detachment breaks the intrinsic link between wall paintings and architecture; causes irreversible physical damage to the texture, topography, and tone of the painting; leaves a void in the stripped interior; with the introduction of new materials, typically leads to a cycle of retreatment; and has resulted in "many transfers in terrible condition that serve as examples of serious, albeit unintentional, maltreatment".

== See also ==
- Conservation-restoration
- Transfer of panel paintings
- Detached Frescos Database
