= Kitora Tomb =

Ancient tomb in Nara Prefecture, Japan

Coordinates: 34°27′04″N 135°48′18″E

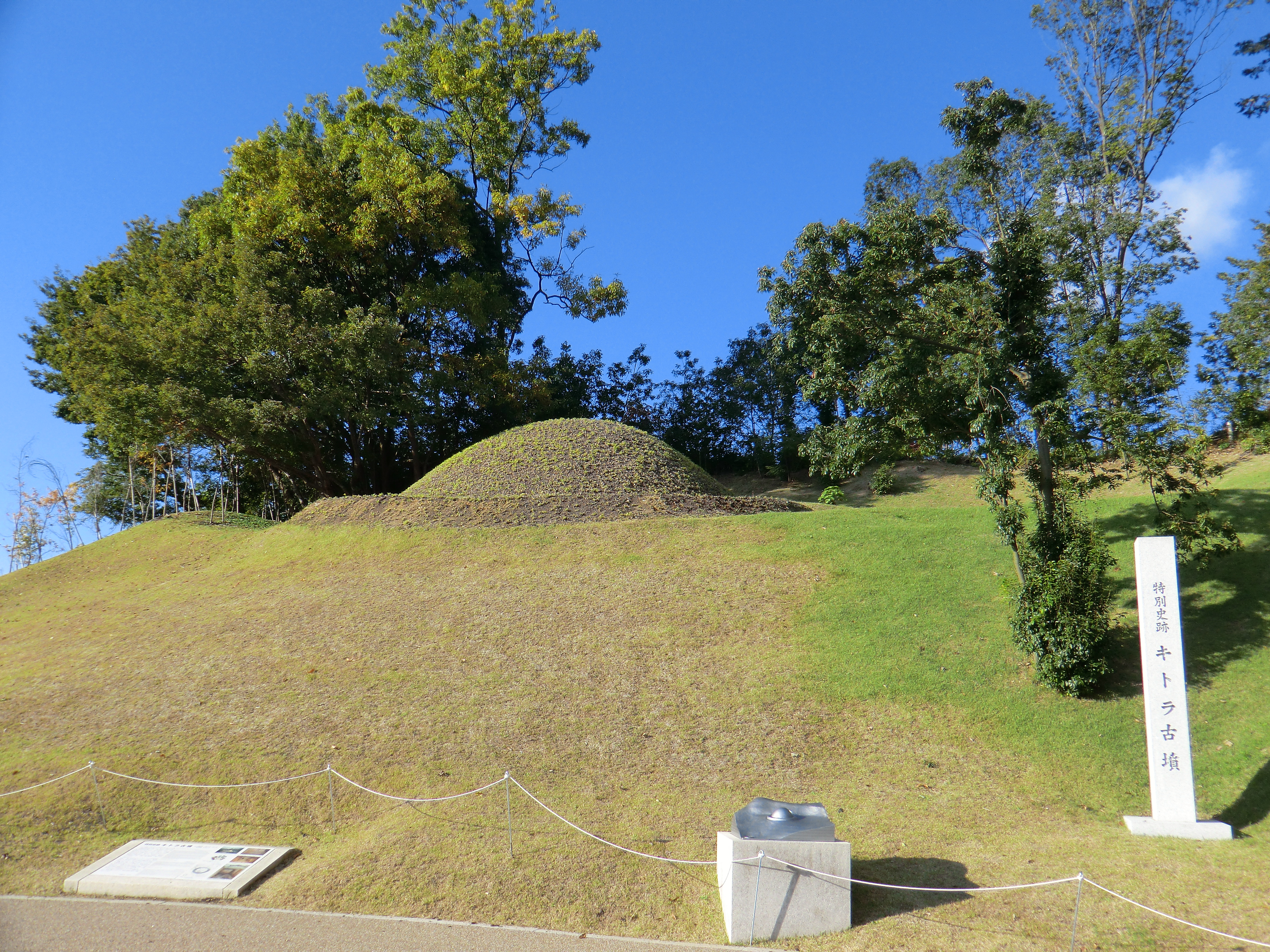
The Kitora Tomb

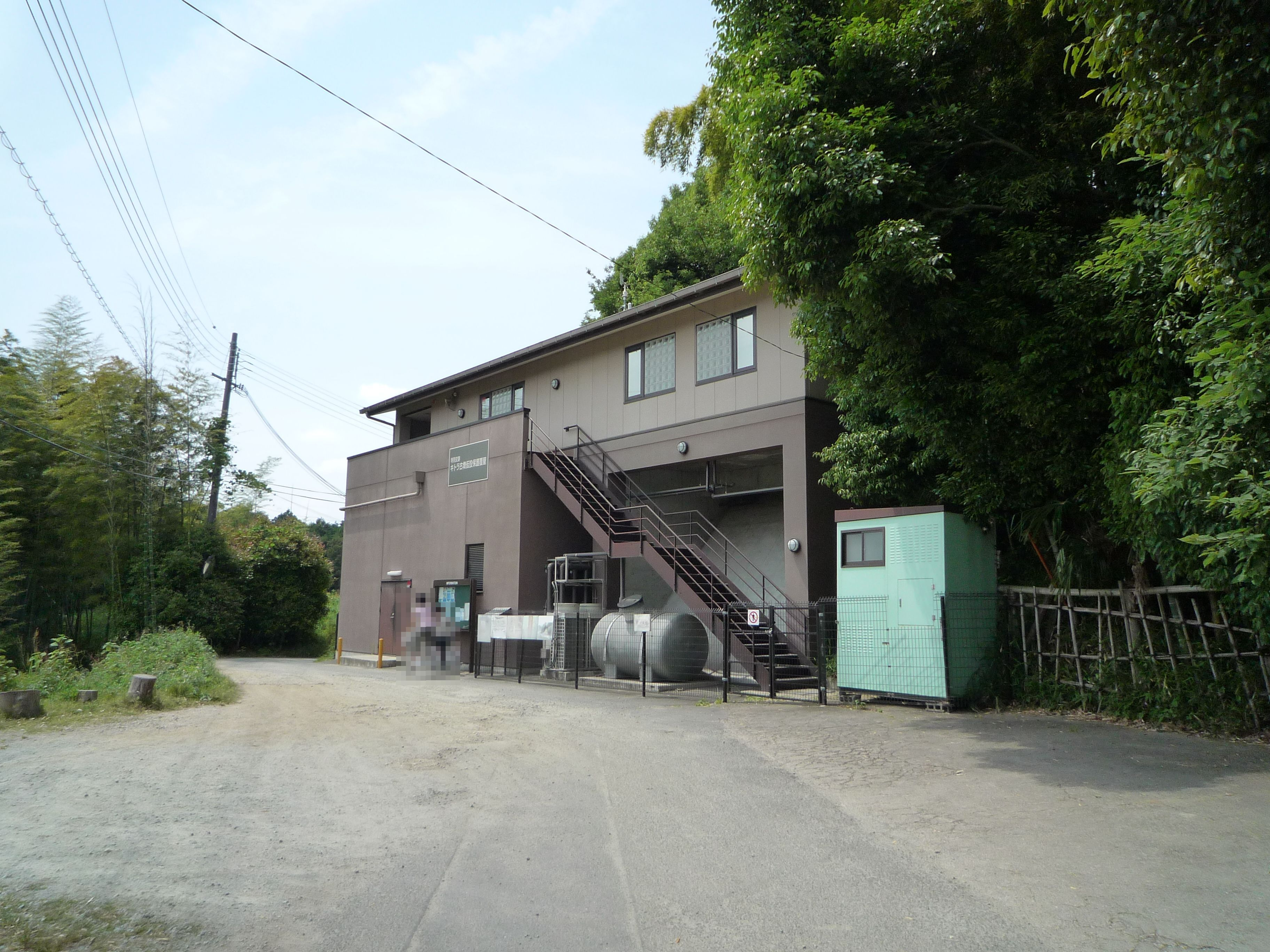
Rear view of building that houses the Kitora Tomb

The Kitora Tomb (キトラ古墳, Kitora Kofun) is an ancient tumulus (kofun in Japanese) located in the village of Asuka, Nara Prefecture, Japan. The tomb is believed to have been constructed some time between the 7th and early 8th centuries, but was only discovered in 1983.

A small stone chamber, the Kitora Tomb is a little over 1 metre in height and width and about 2.4 metres long, just large enough to bury a single person. The four walls are aligned with the cardinal points of the compass, and respectively feature the Black Divine Tortoise of the North, the Azure Dragon of the East, the Red Phoenix of the South, and the White Tiger of the West. On the ceiling of the chamber, there is also an astronomical chart that has been the focus of much research and debate by scholars in the field of archaeoastronomy. In addition, the 12 zodiac animal-headed figures with human bodies are painted on the wall, which may be one of the oldest remaining zodiac murals in East Asia.

Fragments of a lacquered wooden coffin, torn apart when the tomb was robbed, lay 5 cm thick on the chamber floor, mixed with grave goods and human bone. A gilded bronze fitting and sword decorations were discovered, both executed with superbly inlaid patterns. Based upon analysis of the bone fragments and items found in the tomb, it is believed the interred was a middle-aged or older male of aristocratic background.

The paintings have suffered the ravages of time, and, as National Treasure of Japan and World Heritage, their preservation has been accorded the highest priority. The entire tomb has been roofed over, and a series of adjoining antechambers was constructed to isolate the central chamber from temperature and humidity fluctuations, and prevent contamination by airborne mold spores and microorganisms.

== See also ==
- List of Special Places of Scenic Beauty, Special Historic Sites and Special Natural Monuments
- List of National Treasures of Japan (paintings)
- History of Japan
- Kofun period
- Takamatsuzuka Tomb
- Fujinoki Tomb
