= Takamatsuzuka Tomb =

Kofun period burial mound in Japan

Takamatsuzuka Kofun
- 高松塚古墳 (Japanese)
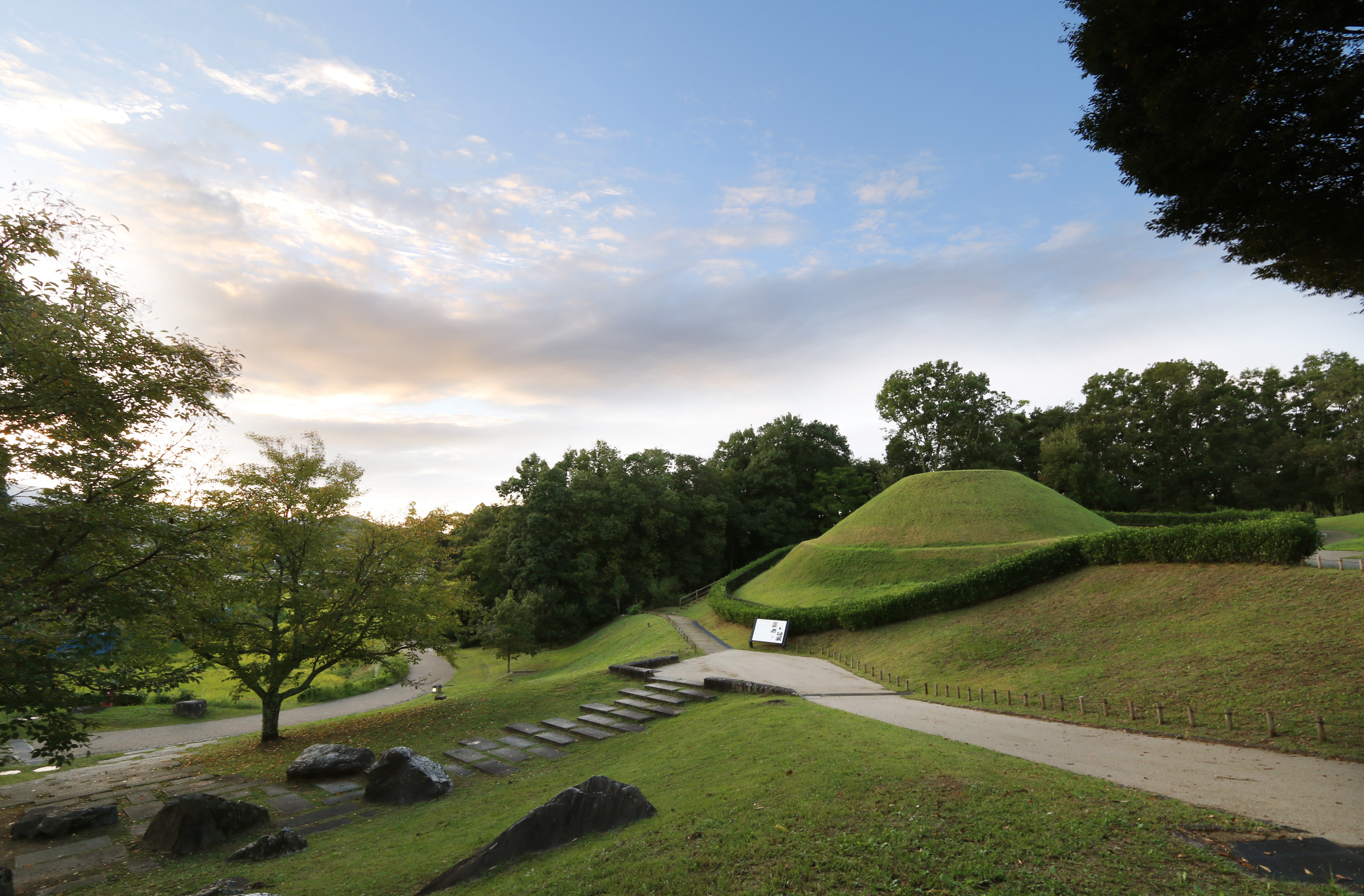
- Takamatsuzuka Kofun

- Takamatsuzuka Kofun Takamatsuzuka Tomb (Japan)
- Interactive map of Takamatsuzuka Kofun
- 34°27′44.0″N 135°48′23.3″E
- Type: Kofun
- Periods: Asuka period
- Location: Asuka, Nara, Japan
- Region: Kansai region

History
- Built: 694 to 710 AD

Site notes
- Public access: Yes (museum)

National Treasure of Japan

The Takamatsuzuka Tomb (高松塚古墳, Takamatsuzuka Kofun) is an Asuka period circular tomb burial mound, located in the village of Asuka, Nara in the Kansai region of Japan. The tumulus was designated a National Historic Site of Japan in 1972.

== History ==
The tumulus was discovered October 1970 when villagers dug a hole to store ginger and found old cut stones. The Nara Prefectural Kashihara Archaeological Institute began archaeological excavations from March 1972 together with researchers and students from Kansai University and Ryukoku University. Due to its small size and lack of historical documentation, the tumulus was regarded as unimportant until the horizontal entry stone burial chamber was opened, at which time it was realized that this was a decorated kofun. The tumulus was designated a Special Historic Site on April 23, 1973, and the vividly colored murals were designated a National Treasure on April 17, 1974.

The tumulus had been looted during the Kamakura period, and looting holes had been opened in the south wall of the burial chamber, but the vivid colors of the murals remained, and some of the grave goods that had escaped looting were also discovered at this time. The discovery of the vividly colored murals made headlines as a rare major discovery, and the Agency for Cultural Affairs immediately began work on preservation.

The tumulus was estimated to have been built from the end of the 7th century to the beginning of the 8th century based on bronze mirrors that had survived looting, but further excavations in 2005 narrowed the time frame to between 694 and 710 during the Fujiwara-kyō period.

== Description ==
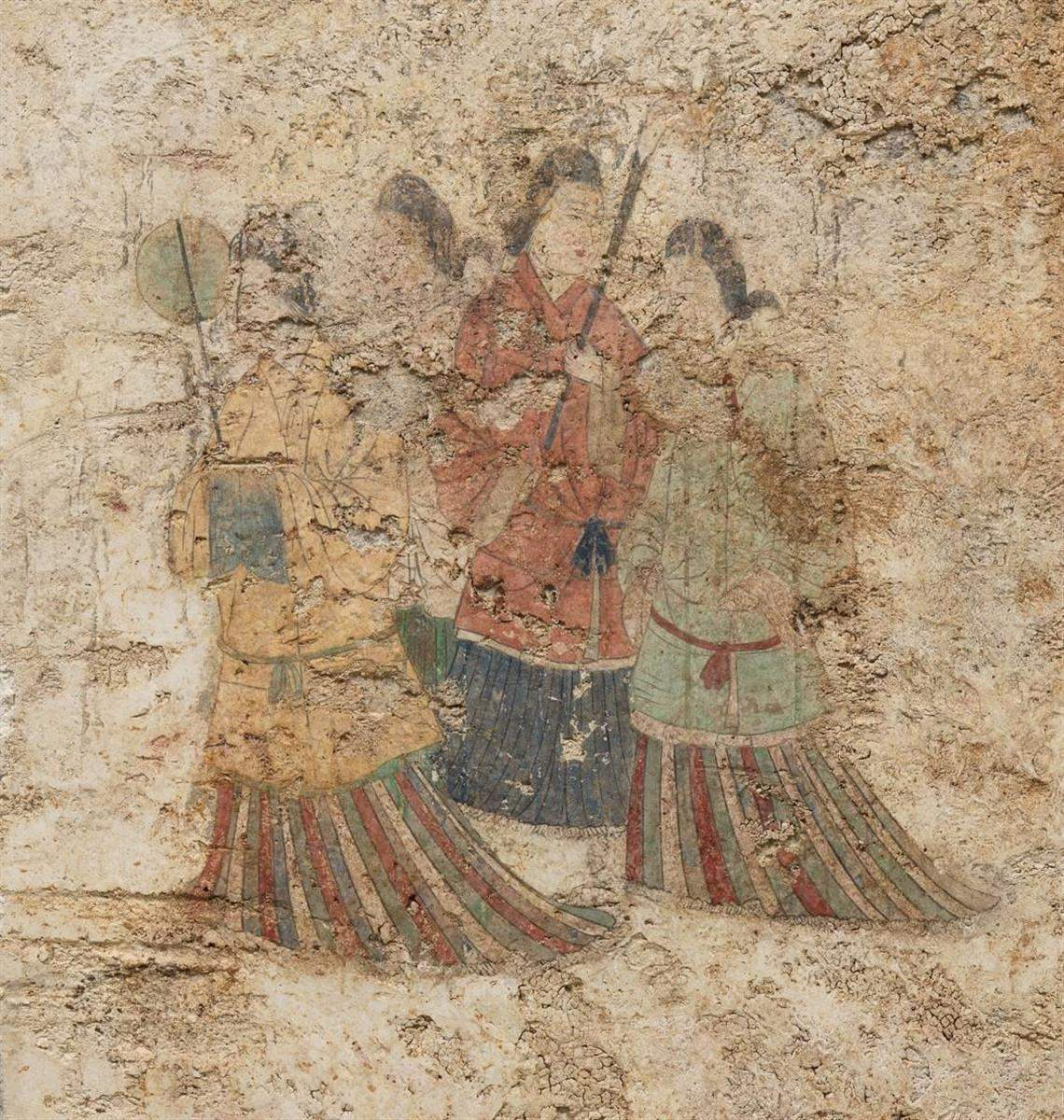
A mural of women on the western wall of the tomb

The mound of the tomb was built of alternating layers of clay and sand. It is about 16 metres (52 ft) in diameter and 5 metres (16 ft) high.

The burial chamber is made of cut tuff stones, has a passageway on the south side, and is long in the north-south direction. The dimensions of the chamber are about 2.65 meters from north-to-south, about 1.03 meters from east-to-west, and about 1.13 meters high (all interior dimensions), making it a very small space. It has an horizontal-entrance stone coffin made by combining slabs of stone on a flat bottom stone, similar to that of the near contemporary Kitora Kofun. The few remaining fragments of the coffin placed in the stone chamber indicate that it was a lacquered wooden coffin. Excavated items include the metal fittings used in the coffin, copper nails, a large sword fitting, bronze mirror, and jewels (made of glass and amber).

The murals are on the east, west, north (rear) walls, and ceiling of the chamber, and are painted in fresco on top of a layer of plaster several millimeters thick applied to the cut stones. The subjects of the murals are human figures (groups of four male courtiers and four serving maidens in Goguryeo-style garb), the sun, the moon, the four gods, and the stars (constellations). The paintings are in full color with red, blue, gold, and silver foil).

On the east wall, from the south side, there is a group of male figures and one of the four directional deities, the Azure Dragon, above which is the sun, and a group of female figures. On the west wall, in contrast, from the south side, there is a group of male figures, the White Tiger, above which is the moon, and a group of female figures. The group of female figures on the west wall was particularly colorful. With the exception of a few of the figures, all are carrying tools, weapons, or musical instruments, which match the belongings of the servants and other officials who lined up for the New Year's morning greeting ceremony seen in the "Jogan Ceremony." Banners of the sun, moon, and four gods are also set up at this New Year's morning greeting ceremony.

A study of dyes and polchromy used in the tomb revealed the usage of red lac resin for one the Beauties' "mo" skirt, indicating that Asuka society had access and trade to South Asia and Southeast Asia at the time, based on new findings by the Agency for Cultural Affairs publicly released on 25 February 2026. This analysis was found through non-destructive methods with the Lady in the Pink Garment, which utilized white lead and red lac resin.

The Black Tortoise, one of the four gods, is painted on the north wall at the back, and stars are painted on the ceiling. It is highly likely that the Vermilion Bird, the southern of the four gods, was painted on the south wall, but this is thought to have been lost during tomb robbery in the Kamakura period. The ceiling painting is a circular gold leaf depiction of stars, with vermilion lines connecting the stars to represent the constellations. In the center is a purple fence consisting of the five stars of the North Pole, and around that are the 28 constellations. The sun and moon on the east and west are depicted with towering mountains floating in a sea of clouds in front of them. There were traces of gold leaf on the sun and silver leaf on the moon. Most of it was lost at the time of excavation, and it is believed that it was artificially scraped off by tomb robbers during the Kamakura period.

== Identification ==
For whom the tomb was built is unknown and has been the subject of much speculation, but the decorations suggest it is for a member of the Japanese royal family or a high-ranking nobleman. Candidates include:

1. Prince Osakabe (d. 705), a son of Emperor Tenmu
2. Prince Yuge (d. 699), also a son of Emperor Tenmu
3. Prince Takechi (c. 654 – 696), also a son of Emperor Temmu, general of Jinshin War, Daijō Daijin
4. Isonokami Ason Maro (640–717), a descendant of Mononobe clan and in charge of Fujiwara-kyō after the capital was moved to Heijō-kyō
5. Kudara no Konikishi Zenkō (617–700), a son of the last king of Baekje, one of the Three Kingdoms of Korea.

== Conservation ==
The Cultural Affairs Agency of Japan is considering taking apart the stone chamber and reassembling it elsewhere to prevent further deterioration to its wall paintings. A painting called Asuka Bijin, or "beautiful women", is one of the murals in the tomb facing deterioration. The unusual preservation method is being considered because the tomb's current situation makes it impossible to prevent further damage and stop the spread of mold.

Unlike the Kitora Tomb, in Asuka removing pieces of the Takamatsuzuka wall plaster and reinforcing them for conservation appears difficult because the plaster has numerous tiny cracks.

== Comparison ==
These are most likely influenced by cultural exchange with the Goguryeo kingdom, as shown by similarities with the tombs near Pyongyang. During that period, Prince Shōtoku was said to have a tutor from the kingdom.

In 2012, a similar mural was found in the Shoroon Bumbagar tomb in Mongolia. The round mound, thought to be built by Göktürks in the 7th century, was excavated by Mongolian and Kazakh researchers. The mural depicts Azure Dragon and White Tiger with a procession of Chinese and Sogdian, and other Caucasoid traders.

== Gallery ==
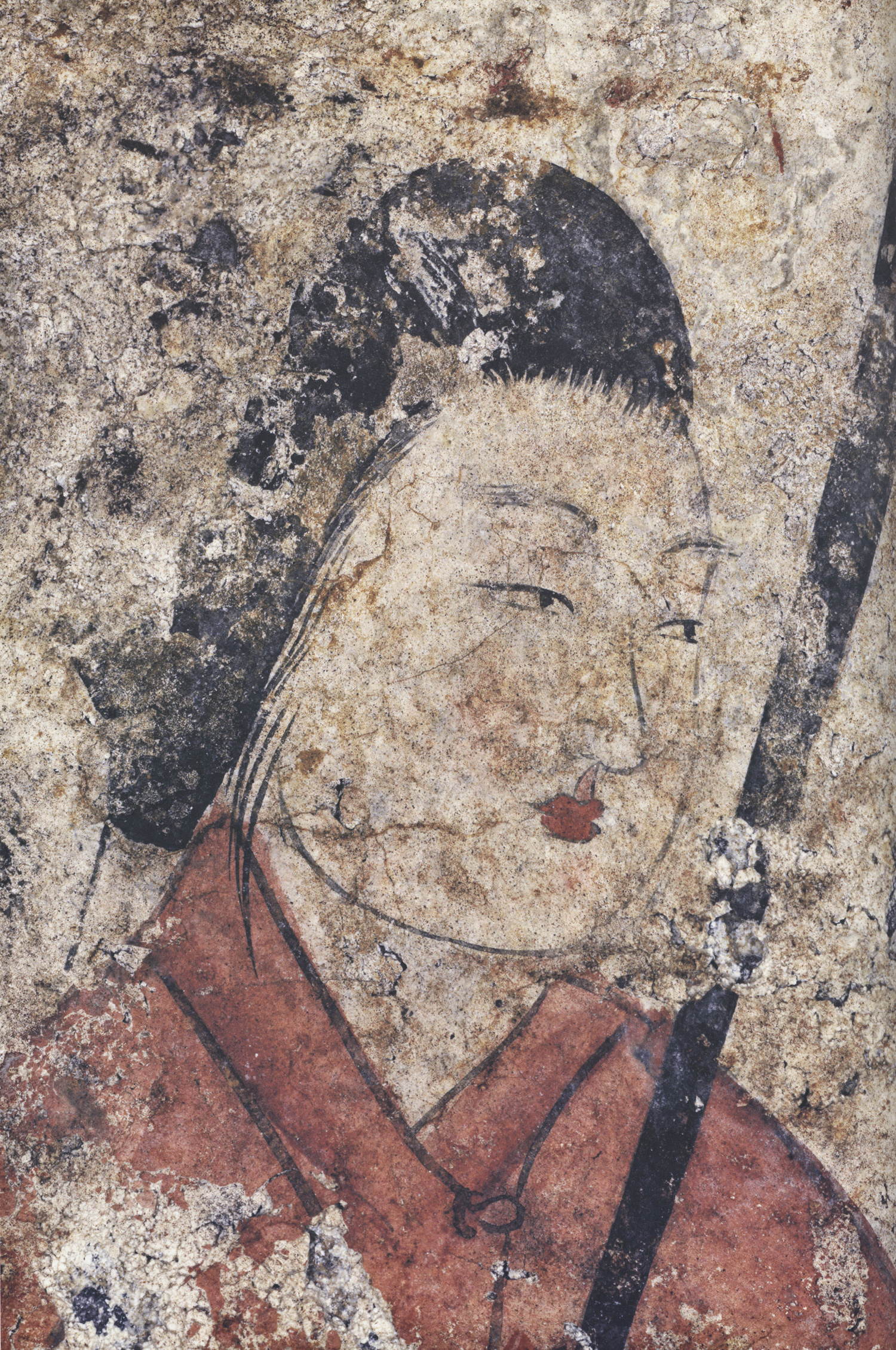
A detail of the Asuka Bijin mural in the tomb

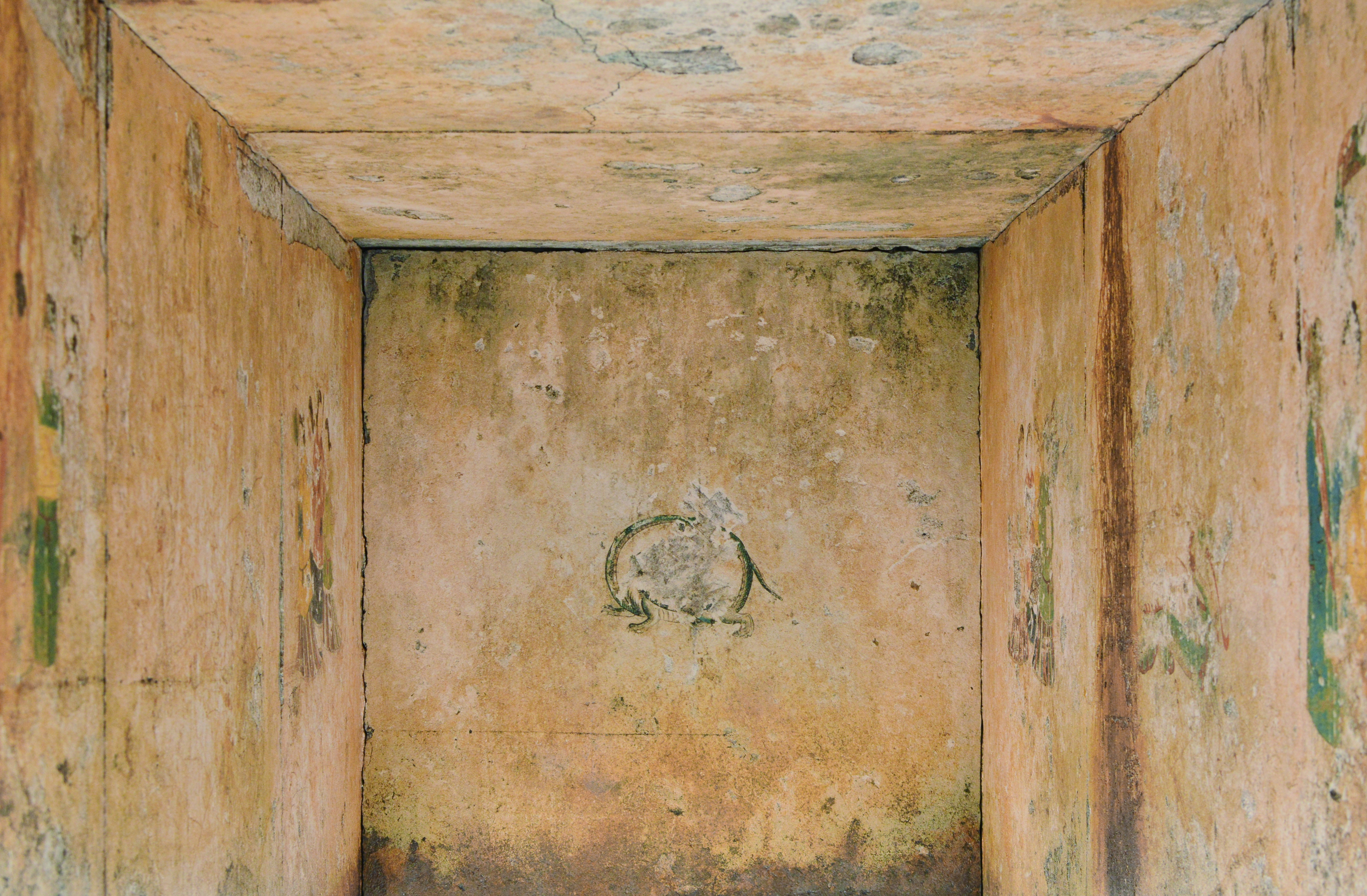
A reproduction of the murals at Kansai University Museum

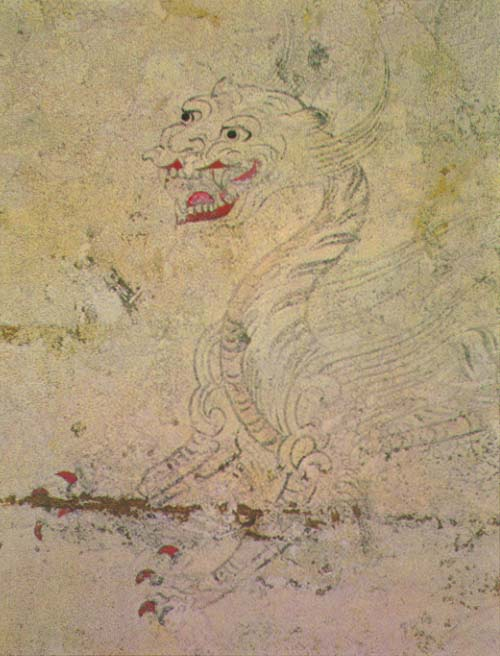
A painting of a byakko in the tomb

== See also ==
- Detachment of wall paintings
- List of National Treasures of Japan (paintings)
- List of Special Places of Scenic Beauty, Special Historic Sites and Special Natural Monuments
- Asuka-Fujiwara
