= Asuka, Nara =

Asuka 明日香村
- Village
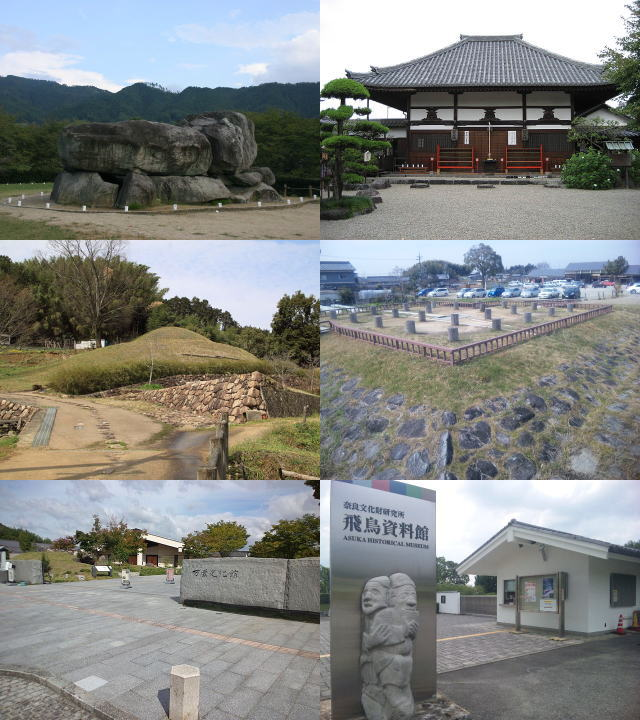
- Top left: Ishibutai (Stone Stage) Tomb, Top right: Asuka Temple, Middle left: Mount Maruko Tomb, Middle right: Mizuochi Ruin, Bottom left: Nara Prefectural Manyo Museum, Bottom right: Asuka Historical Reference Museum

- Flag Emblem

- Location of Asuka in Nara Prefecture
- Interactive map of Asuka
- Location in Japan
- Coordinates: 34°28′16.7″N 135°49′14.6″E
- Country: Japan
- Region: Kansai
- Prefecture: Nara Prefecture
- District: Takaichi
- First official recorded: 539 AD
- Village merged: July 3, 1956

Government
  - Mayor: Yuichi Morikawa (since October 2011)

Area
  - Total: 24.08 km^{2} (9.30 sq mi)

Population (April 1, 2017)
  - Total: 5,681
  - Density: 235.9/km^{2} (611.0/sq mi)
- Time zone: UTC+09:00 (JST)
- City hall address: 55 Ōaza Oka, Asuka-mura, Nara-ken; 634-0111
- Website: asukamura.jp
- Symbols
- Flower: Citrus tachibana
- Tree: Zelkova serrata

Asuka (明日香村, Asuka-mura) is a village located in Takaichi District, Nara Prefecture, Japan. As of April 1, 2017, the village has an estimated population of 5,681, with 2,170 households, and a population density of 240 inhabitants per square mile (93/km^{2}). The total area is 24.08 km^{2} (9.30 sq mi).

Asuka is the land where ancient Asuka (飛鳥) palaces were located. There are strict rules governing construction in this historic town.

Asuka can be reached from Okadera or Asuka Station on Kintetsu Yoshino Line train line. Although it's outside Asuka, Kashiharajingū-mae Station in neighboring Kashihara has service on the Kintetsu Kashihara Line, Minami Osaka Line and Yoshino Lines. By car, Asuka is on Route 169.

== History ==
For the ancient Asuka, see Asuka period and Asuka, Yamato.

In 1956, the village of Asuka (明日香) was founded as a result of a merger of three villages, Sakaai, Takechi and Asuka (飛鳥村).

In 1966, Asuka was proclaimed a "historic town", as defined by the national Special Arrangement for Preservation of Historic Sites Law as well as Kyoto, Nara and Kamakura. The law restricts constructions and other civil engineering operations in the designated areas due to the preservation of the historic sites. In 1967, a part of Asuka, around 391ha in area, was designated as a historic site for preservation. Along with this decision, the government planned to build Asuka National Historic Park, for which construction was launched in 1966 and finished in 1994.

In 1972, a site with colorfully painted murals from the late Asuka period was found in the Takamatsuzuka Tomb.

Since the Special Arrangement for Preservation of Historic Sites Law (1966) restricts any visual changes in the areas which it concerns, it has directly affected the daily life of residents. To preserve the site, they have had to give up some elements of modern life. As compensation, the Asuka Law, which aims to preserve the site effectively and give economic support for Asuka residents, was settled in 1980.

== Asuka megaliths and kofun ==
The Asuka region contains a number of unusual carved granite stones, the largest of which has been named Masuda no iwafune. This granite monolith is approximately 11 metres (36 ft) in length, 8 metres (26 ft) in width, and 4.7 metres (15 ft) in height and estimated at 800 metric tons (1,800,000 lb) in weight. The upper surface is flat, with a shallow trough and two square holes. The megalith is located on top of a hill a few hundred meters west of Okadera Station. When, how or why this and other colossal stones in Asuka were carved remains a mystery. They appear to be in a different style than later Buddhist sculptures.

Nearby there are also several kofun (tombs), including the Ishibutai Kofun—built from massive boulders including one that weighs an estimated 75 tons. This may have been the tomb of Soga no Umako.

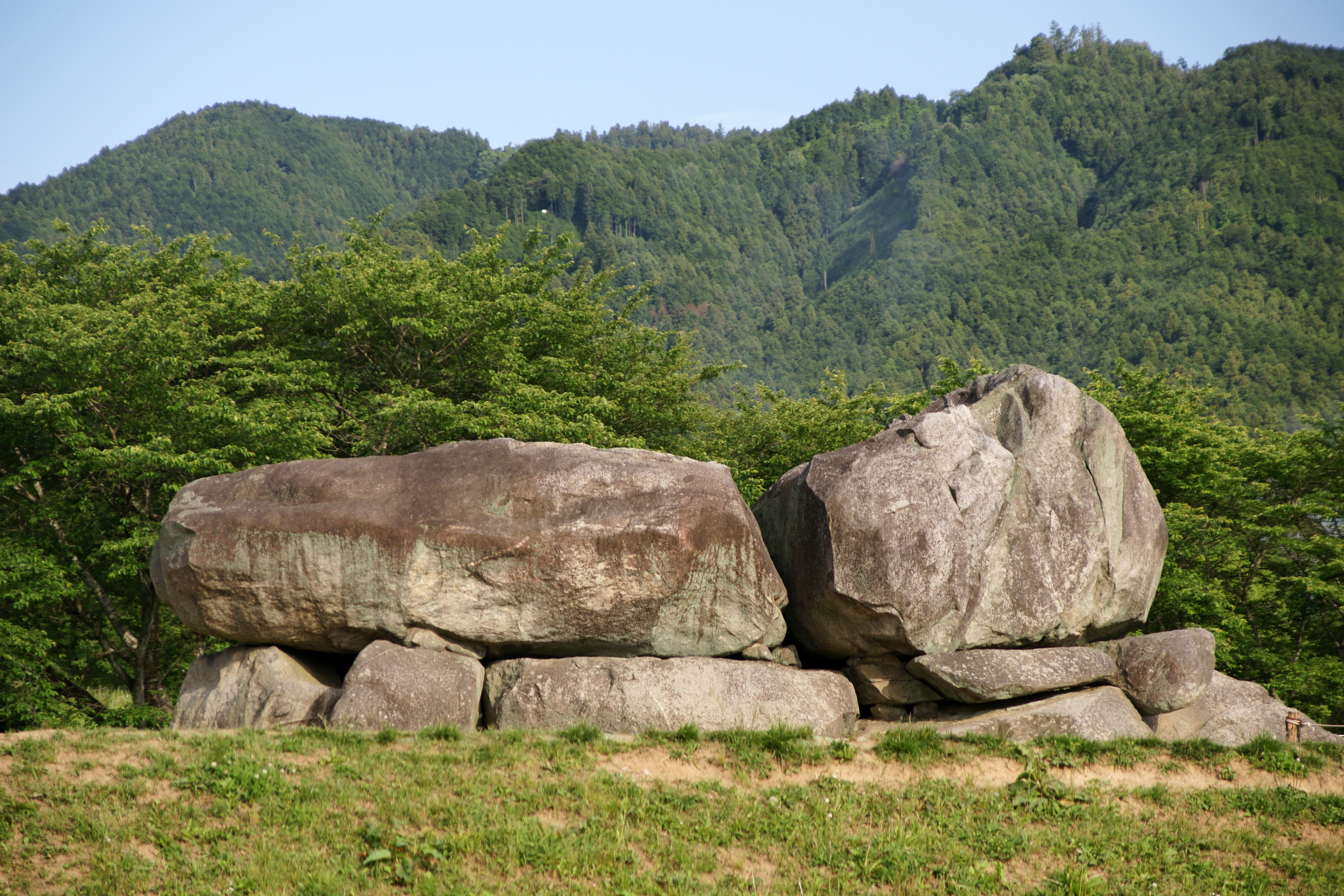
The Ishibutai Kofun in Asuka

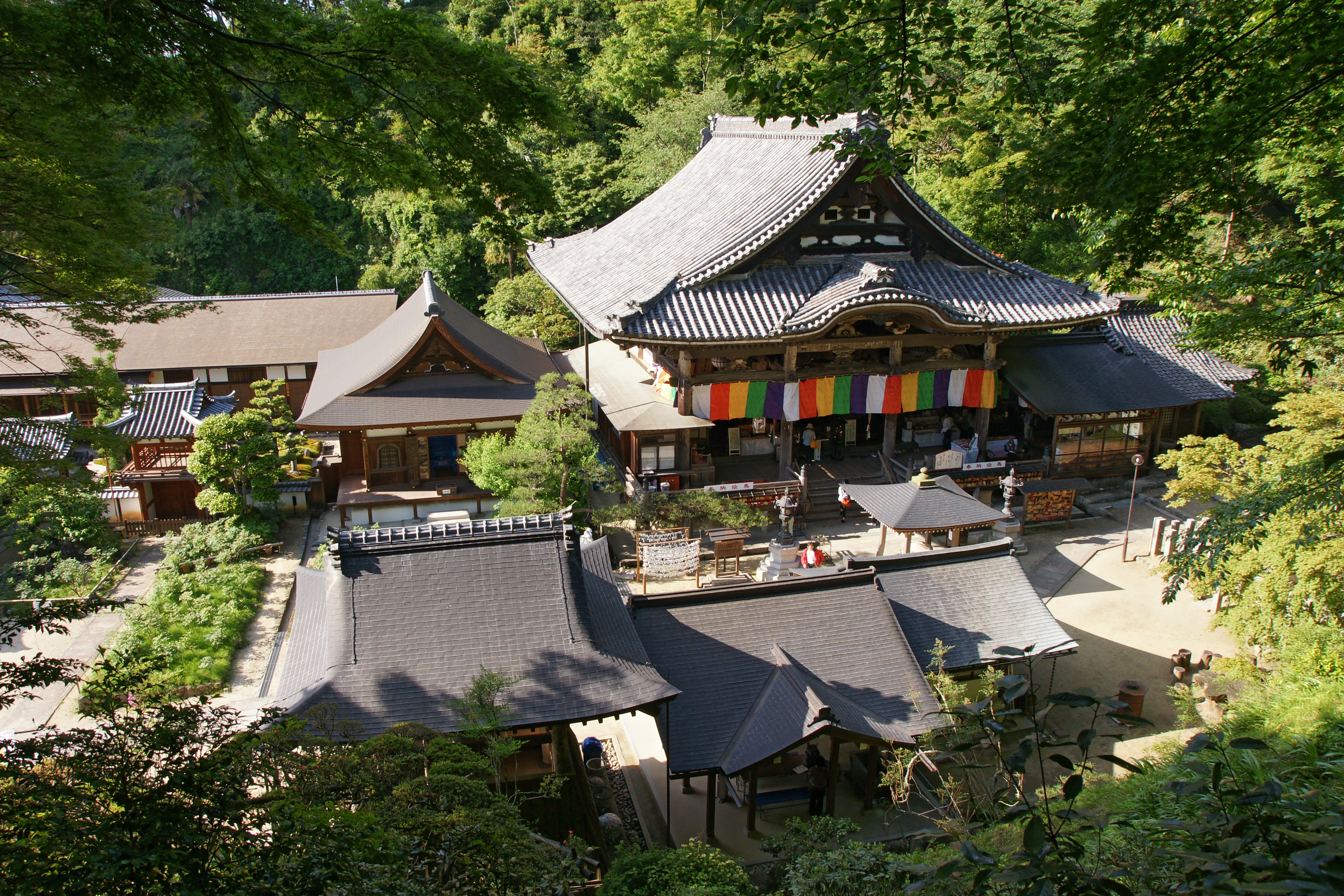
Okadera

== Surrounding municipalities ==
- Nara Prefecture
  - Kashihara
  - Sakurai
  - Takatori
  - Yoshino

== Places of interest ==
- Temples
  - Asuka-dera
  - Oka-dera, aka Ryūgai-ji - Kansai Kannon Pilgrimage No.7
  - Tachibana-dera
- Kameishi (Turtle Rock)
- Ishibutai Kofun
- Kitora Kofun
- Takamatsuzuka Kofun
- Inukai Man'yō Memorial Hall
- Amakashinooka

== Sister cities ==
- Buyeo County, South Korea

== See also ==
- Asuka Period
- Capital of Japan
- Emperor Kinmei
- Empress Suiko
- List of megalithic sites
- Prince Shōtoku
