= Ueyama Kofun =

Kofun period burial mound in Japan

- 植山古墳 (Japanese)
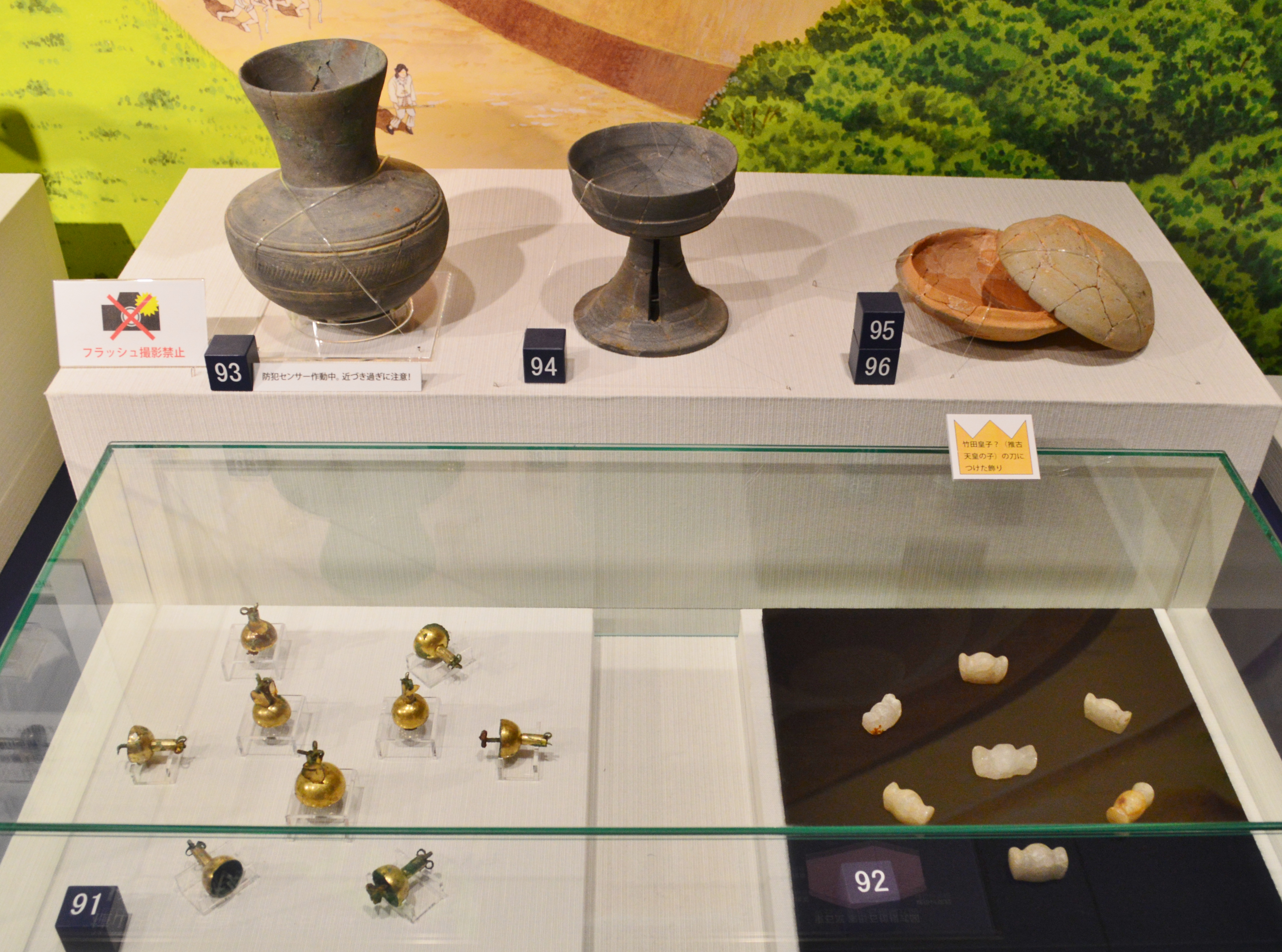
- Grave goods from the Ueyama Kofun

- Ueyama Kofun Ueyama Kofun (Japan)
- Interactive map of Ueyama Kofun
- 34°28′34.4″N 135°48′12.6″E
- Type: Kofun
- Periods: Kofun period
- Location: Kashihara, Nara, Japan
- Region: Kansai region

History
- Built: c.6th-7th century

Site notes
- Public access: Yes (no facilities)

Ueyama Kofun (植山古墳) is a Kofun period burial mound, located in the Gojono neighborhood of the city of Kashihara, Nara in the Kansai region of Japan. The tumulus was designated a National Historic Site of Japan in 2002 with the area under protection expanded in 2003. It was said to be the joint tomb of Empress Suiko and her son Prince Takeda before they were reburied in the Yamada Takatsuka Kofun the Isonagatani Kofun cluster.

== Overview ==
The Ueyama Kofun is located at the western end of the hills extending from Amakashi-no-oka, at the southern end of the Nara Basin. The surrounding area is home to a number of important ancient tombs from the 6th and 7th centuries, including the Maruyama Kofun located about 500 meters west of Ueyama Kofun and Shōbuike Kofun located about 700 meters southeast. The Ueyama Kofun is a hōfun (方墳)-style rectangular burial mound measuring 40 meters east-to-west and 27 meters north-to-south and between three and six meters in height, although it may have originally been an enpun (円墳)-style circular kofun. It was built by partly carving out the southern slope of a natural hill. The east, west, and north of the mound are surrounded by a U-shaped moat. The tumulus is a twin-chamber tomb as it has two horizontal-entry stone burial chambers, one on the east side and one on the west side. The construction method and shape of the tumulus are typical of the ancient tombs of the Asuka region from the end of the 6th century to the first half of the 7th century. It was robbed before the modern period, and a number of the stones used in its construction, including the monolithic ceiling stone for the east burial chamber, which was repurposed as a water basin during the construction of Kashihara Shrine in the early Meiji period.

The east burial chamber has a length of 13 meters and opens to the south. It has an antechamber length of 6.5 meters, a width of 3.0 to 3.2 meters. The ceiling stone that has been lost but the remaining ceiling height is 3.1 meters. It has an entrance passageway length of 6.5 meters, a width of 1.9 meters, and a height of 2.2 meters. A hollowed-out house-shaped stone coffin made of tuff from Mount Aso was placed in the antechamber. In the drainage ditch, gilt bronze ornamental metal fittings from horse harnesses and a crystal three-ringed ball hilt from an iron sword were found.

The western burial chamber is also 13 meters long and opens to the south. It is 5.2 by 2.5 meters, and although most of the ceiling stones have also been lost, it is 4.5 meters high. The passageway is 7.8 meters long, 2.3 meters wide and 2.0 meters high. The coffin is lost, but fragments of Aso tuff were found in the burial chamber, suggesting the possibility that a stone coffin was placed there. In the center of the burial chamber, there is a stone support that serves as the door that separates the burial chamber from the passageway. Sue ware was excavated.

The location and configuration of this tumulus correspond to an account in the Nihon Shoki, which stated that Empress Suiko was buried in the tomb of her son, Prince Takeda, in 628. The Kojiki adds that the remains were later relocated to a larger tomb in Isonagatani, Kawachi Province.

The tumulus is about a 15-minute walk from Okadera Station on the Kintetsu Railway Yoshino Line.

== See also ==
- List of Historic Sites of Japan (Nara)
