= Mount Miminashi =

Historic mountain in Kashihara, Japan

- 耳成山
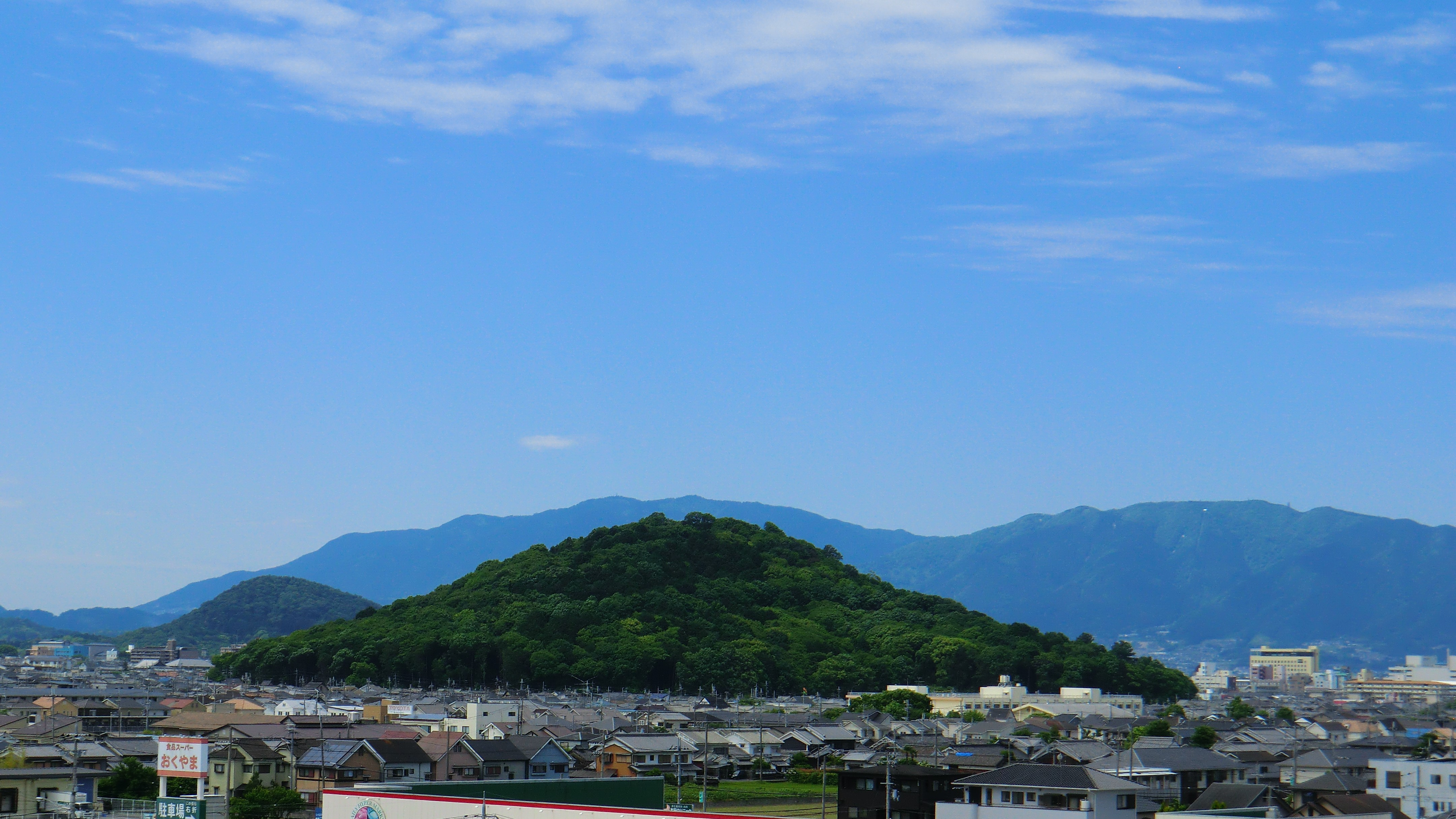
- View of Mount Miminashi.

Highest point
- Elevation: 139 m (456 ft)
- Listing: List of mountains in Japan; Yamato Sanzan
- Coordinates: 34°40′53″N 135°48′19″E

Naming
- Language of name: Japanese

Geography
- Location within Japan
- Location: Kashihara, Nara Prefecture, Japan

Mount Miminashi (耳成山, Miminashi-yama) is a mountain located in the Nara Basin, in the city of Kashihara, in the central-western part Nara Prefecture, Japan. Together with Mount Unebi and Mount Amanokagu, it belongs to the so-called "Yamato Sanzan".
