= Shōbuike Kofun =

Kofun period burial mound in Japan

- 菖蒲池古墳 (Japanese)
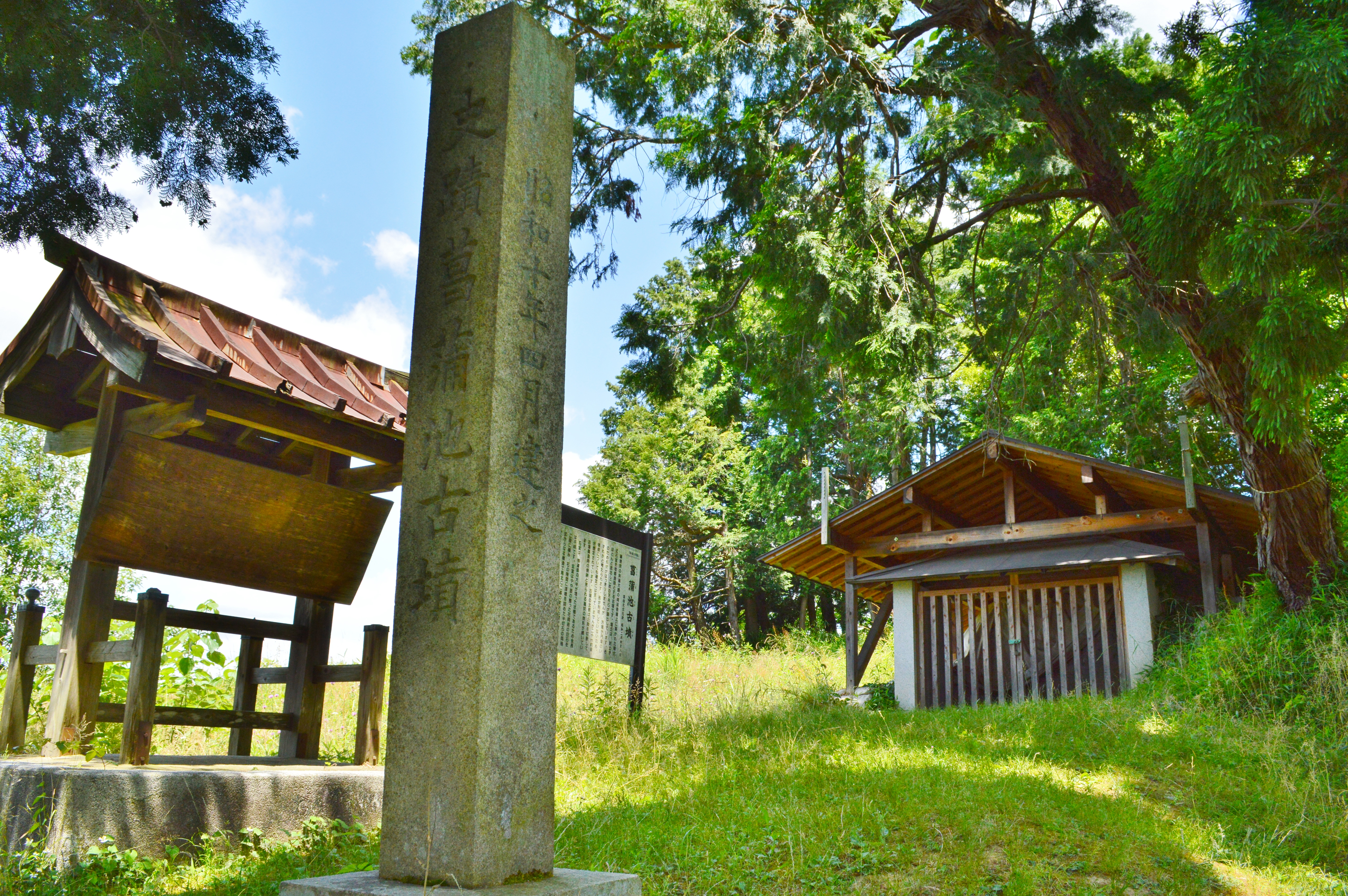
- Shōbuike Kofun

- Shōbuike Kofun Shōbuike Kofun (Japan)
- Interactive map of Shōbuike Kofun
- 34°28′21.91″N 135°48′28.82″E
- Type: Kofun
- Periods: Kofun period
- Location: Kashihara, Nara, Japan
- Region: Kansai region

History
- Built: c.7th century

Site notes
- Public access: Yes (no facilities)

Shōbuike Kofun (菖蒲池古墳) is a Kofun period burial mound, located in the Shōbu-chō neighborhood of the city of Kashihara in the Kansai region of Japan. The tumulus was designated a National Historic Site of Japan in 1927. It is known for two house-shaped stone coffins of unprecedented fine craftsmanship.

== Overview ==
The Shōbuike Kofun is located on the lower southern slope of a ridge near the border between Kashihara and the village of Asuka, on the southern edge of the Nara Basin Most of the mound has disappeared due to erosion, leaving two ceiling stones exposed, but it was originally a hōfun (方墳)-style square tumulus approximately 30 meters on each side, with a height of 7.5 meters. The tumulus was constructed in two tiers, with the upper tier measuring approximately 18 meters on each side. The north, east, and west sides of the mound are surrounded by ditches, and the surface of the mound is covered with reddish-gray clay.

The stone burial chamber is a horizontal-entry cave-type chamber that opens to the south, but the lower half of the chamber and the passageway are buried, so the entire structure is unclear. The burial chamber is 6 meters long, 2.4 meters wide, and 2.5 meters high. The chamber is made of two tiers of evenly-faced granite boulders topped by three ceiling stones. The walls have plaster filling the gaps between the stones. Two hollowed-out house-shaped sarcophagi made of hyaloclastite from the Kakogawa River basin in Hyogo Prefecture are placed on the north and south sides of the burial chamber. The two sarcophagi are roughly the same shape (the southern sarcophagus is slightly more elaborate). The lids of both sarcophagi have been moved and are damaged on all sides, but they are both elaborate with hipped-ridge style roofs, with the ridge of the lid of the northern sarcophagus flat and the southern sarcophagus concave. Vermillion lacquer traces have been found inside the northern sarcophagus, and not in the southern; however, it is possible that both were once vermillion lacquered inside and outside. Based on excavated pottery, the Shōbuike Kofun is estimated to have been built in the mid-7th century, during the final period of the Kofun period or even into the Asuka period.

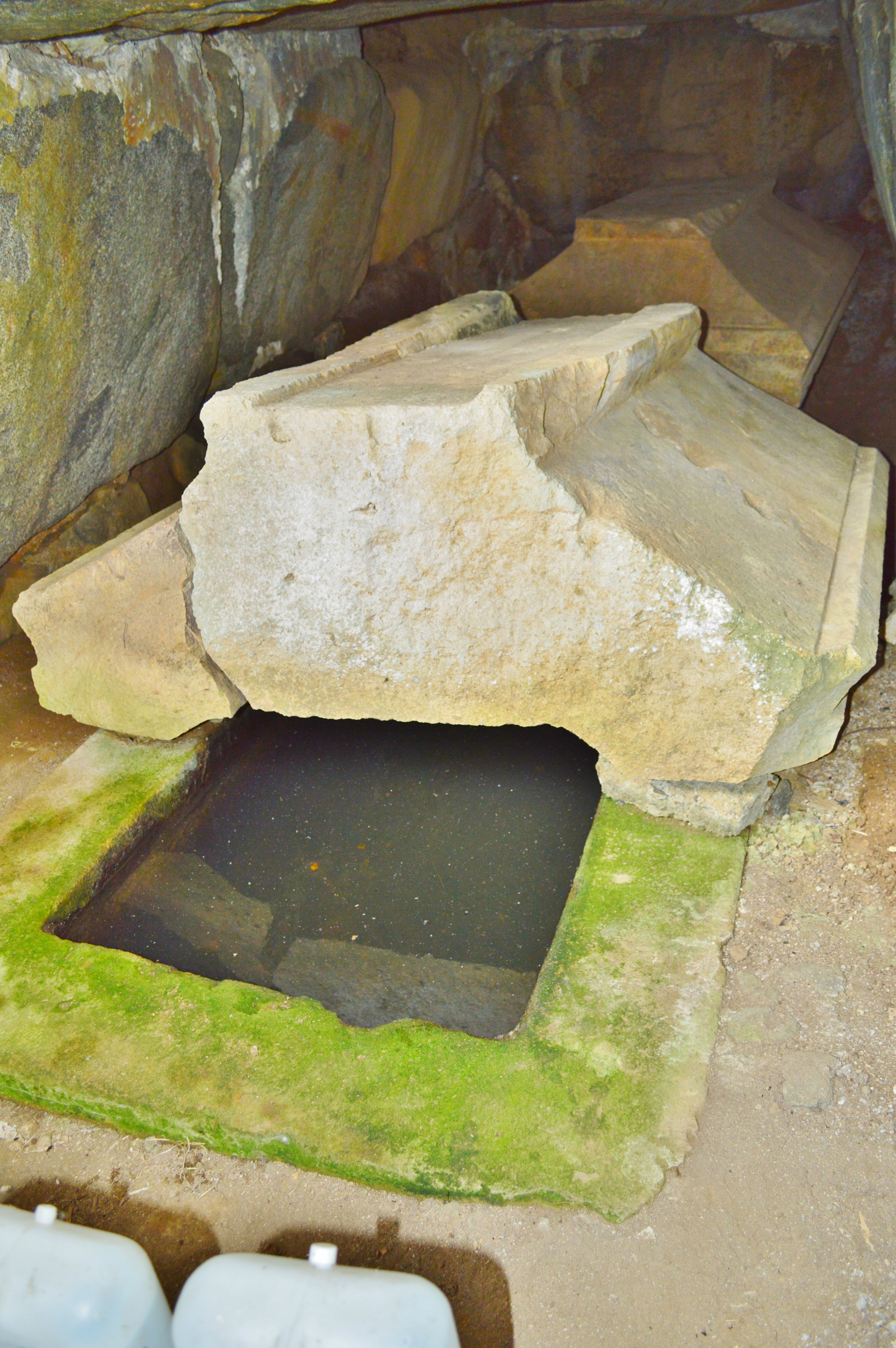
Sarcophagus in the Shōbuike Kofun

It is theorized that the burials are that of members of the imperial family, as the tombs of Emperor Tenmu and Empress Jitō are also located on the southern extension of the central axis (Suzaku-oji) of Fujiwara-kyō. It is also theorized that this was the tomb for members of the Soga clan, due to its similarly in construction to the tombs of Soga no Emishi and Soga no Iruka. The site is about a 15-minute walk from Okadera Station on the Kintetsu Railway Yoshino Line.

== See also ==
- List of Historic Sites of Japan (Nara)
