= Yagi =

Yagi may refer to:

== Places ==
- Yagi, Kyoto, in Japan
- Yagi (Kashihara), in Nara Prefecture, Japan
- Yagi Ridge, a mountain ridge in British Columbia, Canada
- Yagi-nishiguchi Station, in Kashihara, Nara, Japan
- Kami-Yagi Station, a JR-West Kabe Line station located in 3-chōme, Yagi, Asaminami-ku, Hiroshima, Hiroshima Prefecture, Japan
- Rikutyū-Yagi Station, a railway station on the East Japan Railway Company Hachinohe Line located in Hirono, Iwate Prefecture, Japan
- Yamato-Yagi Station, a Kintetsu Corporation railway train station situated in the Nara Prefecture

== Other uses ==
- Yagi (surname)
- Typhoon Yagi (disambiguation)
- Yagi (Usagi Yojimbo), a comic book character
- Y.A.G.I, 2016 album by Lil Kesh
- Yagi–Uda antenna, a directional radio antenna
- Yagibushi, a popular Japanese folk song and dance
