= Maruyama Kofun (Kashihara) =

Kofun period keyhole-shaped burial mound in Japan

- 丸山古墳 (Japanese)
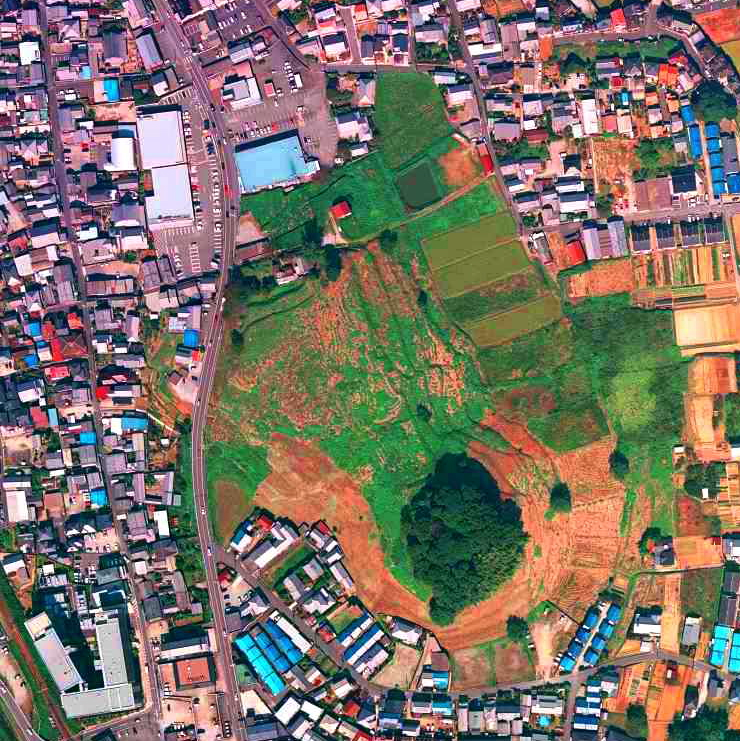
- Maruyama Kofun

- Maruyama Kofun Maruyama Kofun (Kashihara) (Japan)
- Interactive map of Maruyama Kofun
- 34°28′33.12″N 135°47′53.98″E
- Type: Kofun
- Periods: Kofun period
- Location: Kashihara, Nara, Japan
- Region: Kansai region

History
- Built: c.6th century

Site notes
- Public access: Yes (no facilities)

Maruyama Kofun (丸山古墳) is a Kofun period burial mound, located in the Mise-chō, Gojōnō-chō, and Oikaru-chōo neighborhoods of the city of Kashihara, Nara in the Kansai region of Japan. The tumulus was designated a National Historic Site of Japan in 1969 with the area under protection expanded in 1983; however, the posterior circular portion of the tumulus is under the direct control of the Imperial Household Agency as a possible imperial tomb. The tumulus is also called the Gojōnō Maruyama Kofun (五条野丸山古墳), Oikaru Maruyama Kofun (大軽丸山古墳), or the Mise Maruyama Kofun (見瀬丸山古墳). It is the largest kofun in Nara Prefecture and the 6th largest in the country.

== Overview ==
As the name "Maruyama" suggests, this tumulus has long been considered a simple enpun (円墳)-style circular tomb, but archaeological surveys have found that it is an extremely largezenpō-kōen-fun (前方後円墳), which is shaped like a keyhole, having one square end and one circular end, when viewed from above. It is estimated to have been built in the late 6th century, but the person buried there is subject to considerable debate. The tumulus is built on a slope on a hill and has a total length of 318 meters. The anterior rectuangular portion has a front width of 210 meters and a height of 15 meters. The posterior circular mound has a diameter of 155 meters and height of 21 meters. No fukiishi roofing stones have been found on the mound. The tumulus is surrounded by a single moat.

The horizontal-entry burial chamber is 28.4 meters long, making it the largest in Japan. The 20.1 meter entrance passage is covered with six huge natural stones, each 4.8 meters long, over 1 meter wide, and about 1.5 meters in thickness. The burial chamber per is 8.3 meters long, 4.1 meters wide at its widest point, and 4.5 meters high. Inside are two hollowed-out house-shaped stone coffins, placed perpendicular to each other in an L shape. About one meter of soil has accumulated in the burial chamber, and details about the bodies of the stone coffins are unknown, but the inner coffin has a lid length of 2.42 meters, width 1.44 meters, and height 0.42 meters. The front coffin has a lid length of 2.75 meters, width 1.41 meters, and height 0.63 meters. The material is rhyolite welded tuff and Tatsuyama stone from the Kakogawa area. Usually, the burial chamber is placed in the center of a circular mound, but in the Maruyama tumulus it is about 20 meters off center.

Several investigations of the interior of the burial chamber were carried out from the late Edo period to the Meiji period. In his 1796 Koretoku Jikkenki, Tsutsumi Koretoku measured the length of the chamber and recorded that it was flooded with the water was up to his waist. This was also recorded in Kitaura Sadamasa's 1848 Utsuminawa. According to Tsukui Kiyokage's 1854 Seiseki Zushi, two house-shaped stone coffins remain inside the burial chamber, one parallel to the main axis toward the right of the chamber, and the one in the back facing to the side. In the Meiji period, William Gowland, an English mining engineer who has been called the "Father of Japanese Archaeology"., evaluated it as "Japan's largest dolmen ". According to his records, the passageway is covered with six huge natural stones (the largest being 16 feet), and was about 60 feet long, 8 to 10 feet high, and 4 to 8 feet wide, and the walls are made of huge rough natural stones. After walking 40 feet down the passageway, he found that water had accumulated inside to a depth of about four feet, so he could not enter the main chamber, but observed two house-shaped stone coffins just barely emerging from the water. Many of the items he excavated from the site are kept in the British Museum. In 1880, a document called the Afukino Sanryoki was discovered at Kozan-ji in Kyoto, which detailed the state of the interior of the tomb, and stated that it had been the subject of grave robbery during the Kamakura period.

Although tradition had stated since ancient times that this was the joint tomb of Emperor Tenmu and Empress Jitō no evidence had been uncovered to verify that this despite these numerous investigations. As a result, the Imperial Household Ministry determined that the joint tomb of the two emperors was officially the Noguchi no Omune, located about one kilometer southwest, although part of the upper part of the circular mound was designated as a "reference site" for imperial tombs, and placed under restrictions against further archaeological investigation.

A Tang-style bronze mirror unearthed from the mound at the end of the mound after the designation was removed is currently housed at the Kyoto University Museum. During an on-site survey by the Imperial Household Agency, a fragment of Sue ware pottery, was unearthed, and since not a single haniwa, which is usually found in mounds built up until the mid-5th or 6th century, was found, the theory that the mound was built in the latter half of the 6th century is considered the most likely. In 1991, while playing with a friend, a child living in Kashihara City discovered the entrance to the horizontal burial chamber passageway outside the fence of the mound. The hole was exposed when the soil of the mound collapsed due to heavy rain a few days earlier. The father of the child entered the mound with his child through the passageway and took pictures of the inside of the burial chamber. The photos were analyzed by a joint effort between Tokai University's Information Technology Center and Konica. Both house-shaped sarcophagi were arranged according to records from the Edo period, and were buried in mud up to the lids. Based on the characteristics of the rope-hanging protrusions on the lids, it was estimated that the front sarcophagus was hollowed out and built in the third quarter of the sixth century, and the back sarcophagus was built in the first quarter of the seventh century. The weight of the megalith in front of the granite stone chamber was estimated to be over 100 tons, surpassing the 75 tons of the stone chamber at Ishibutai Kofun. Based on the stone masonry style, the stone chamber was thought to have been built between the end of the sixth century and the beginning of the seventh century.

The tumulus is about a five-minute walk from Okadera Station on the Kintetsu Railway Yoshino Line.]

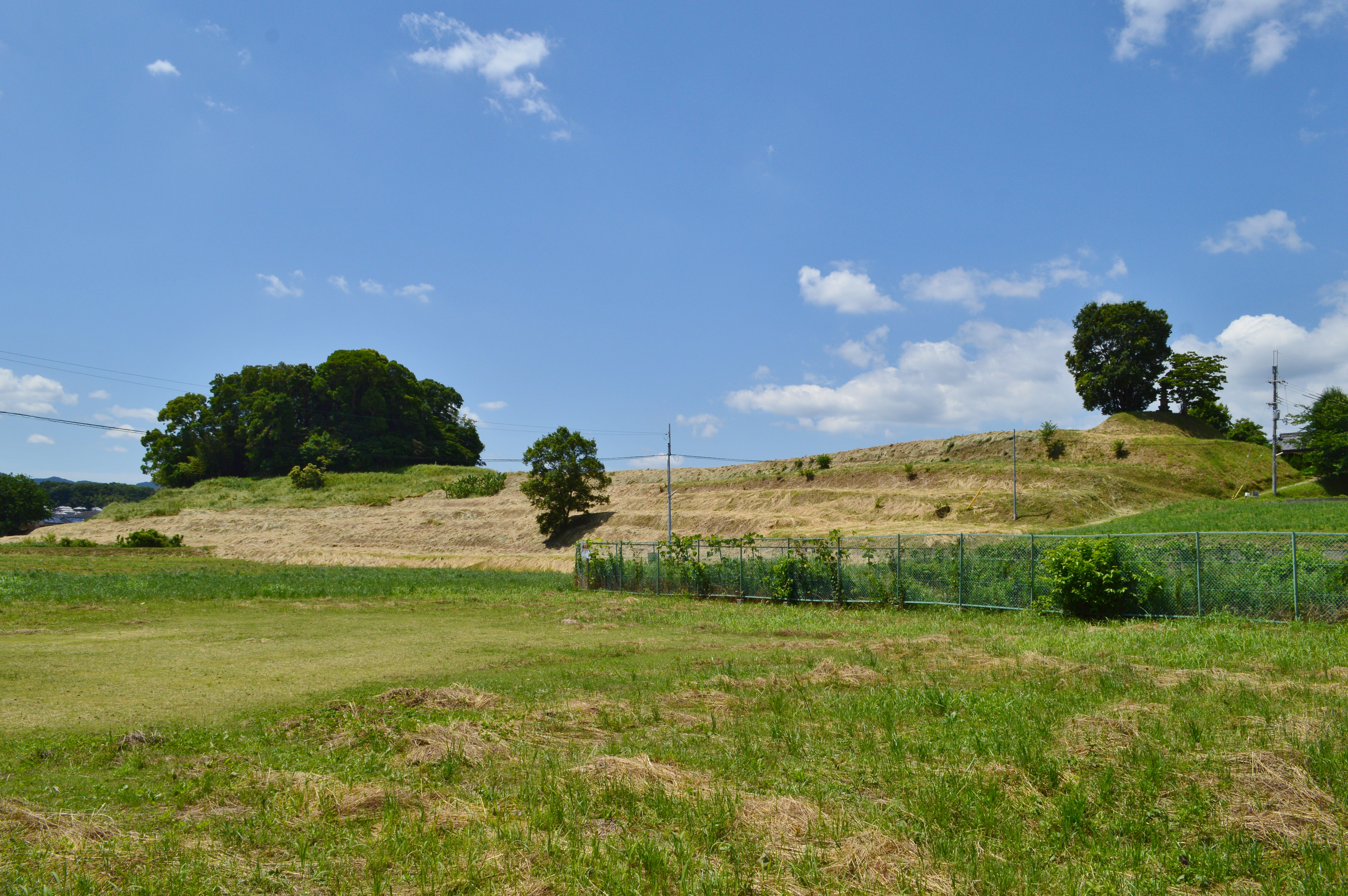
View of the east side

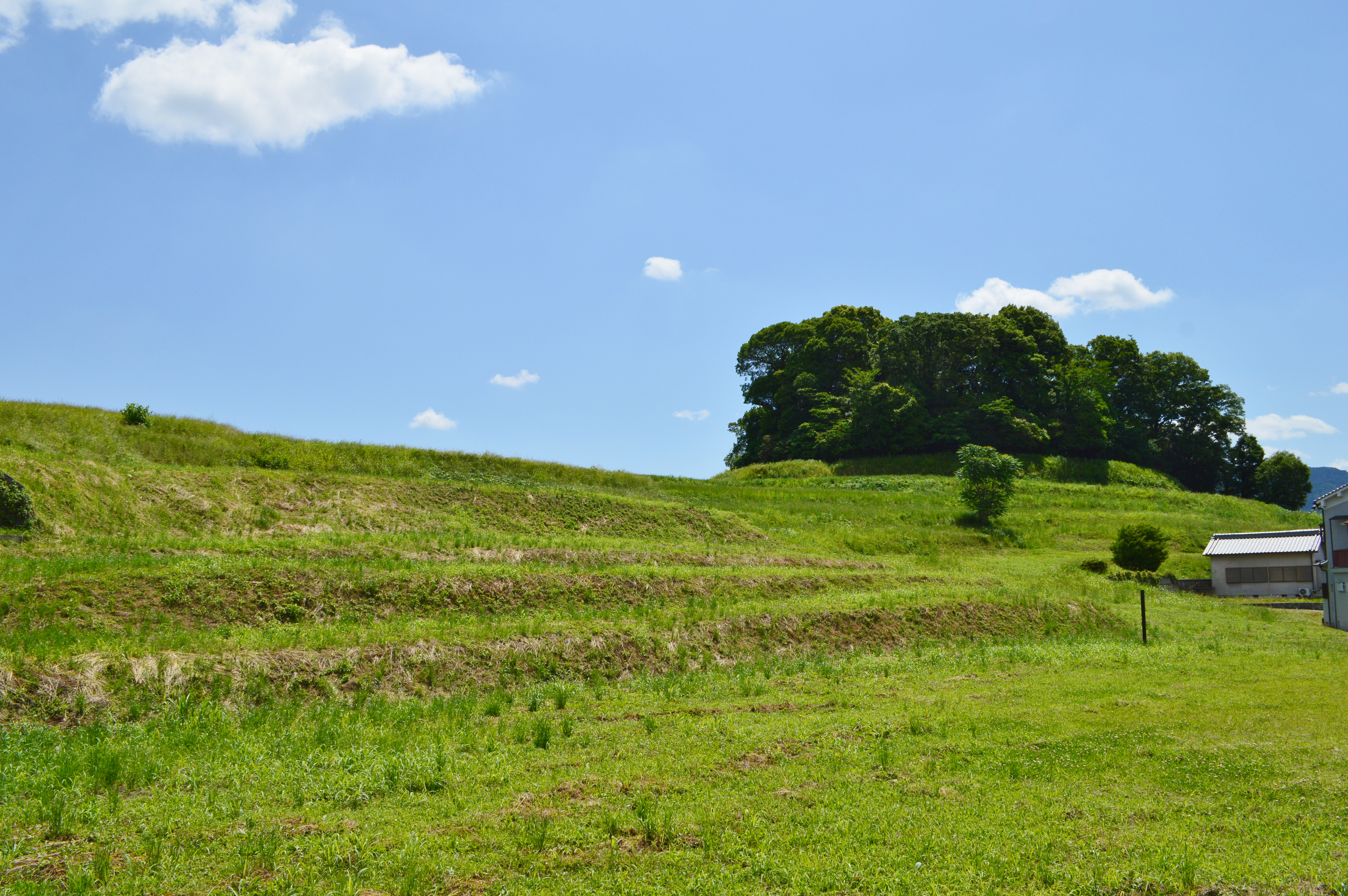
View of the west side

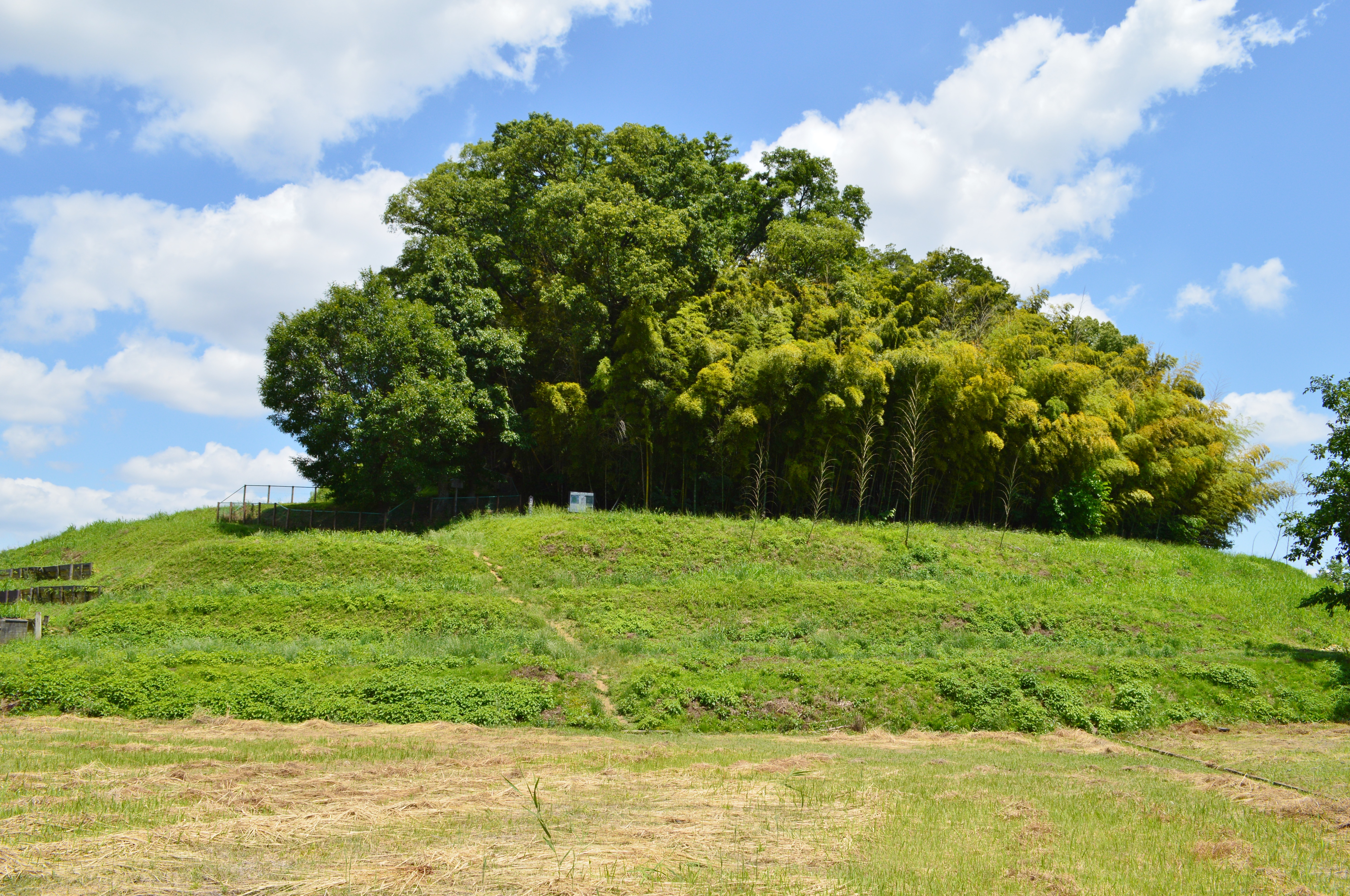
Rear circular mound

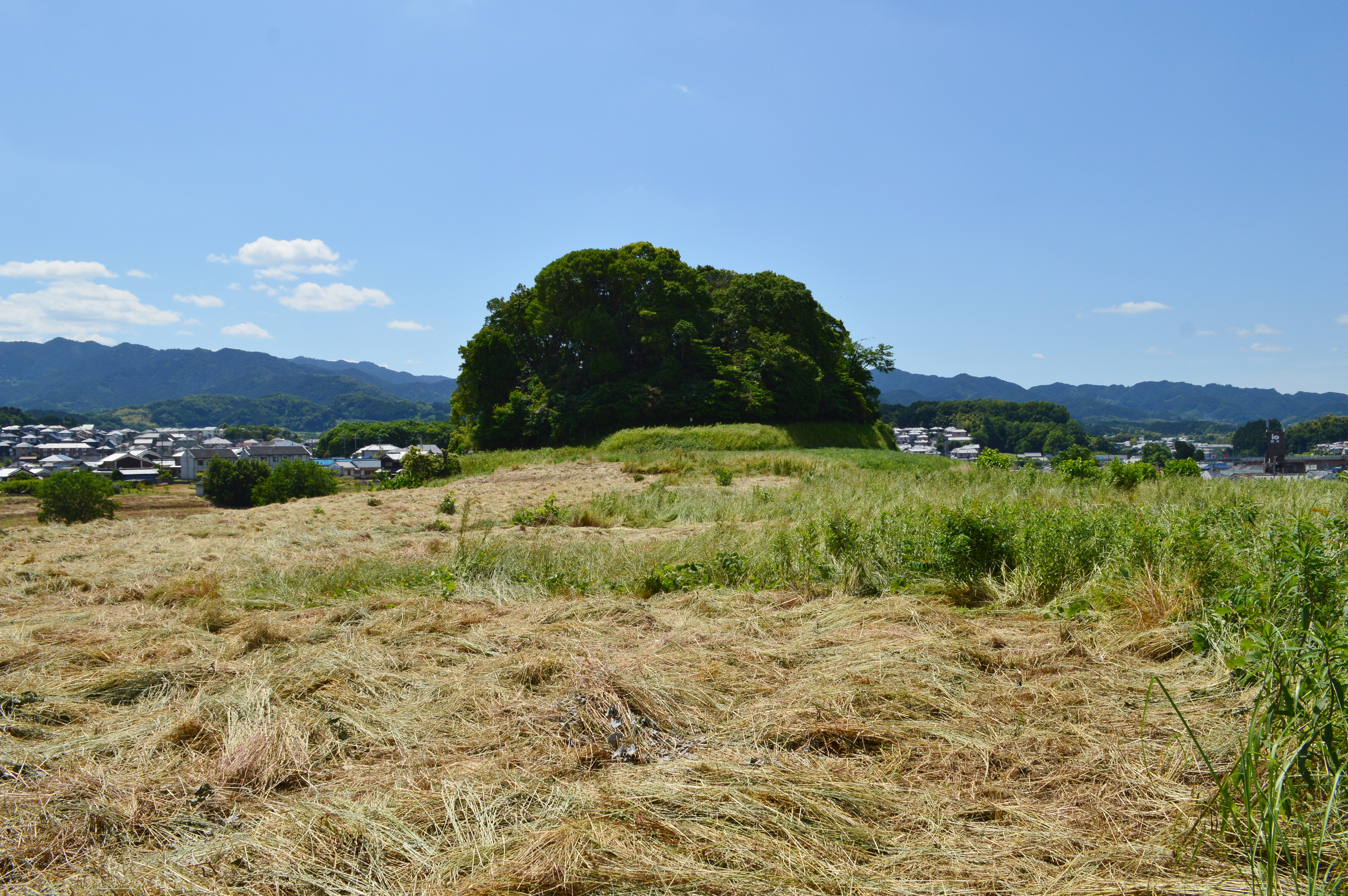
Rear circular mound (viewed from the front)

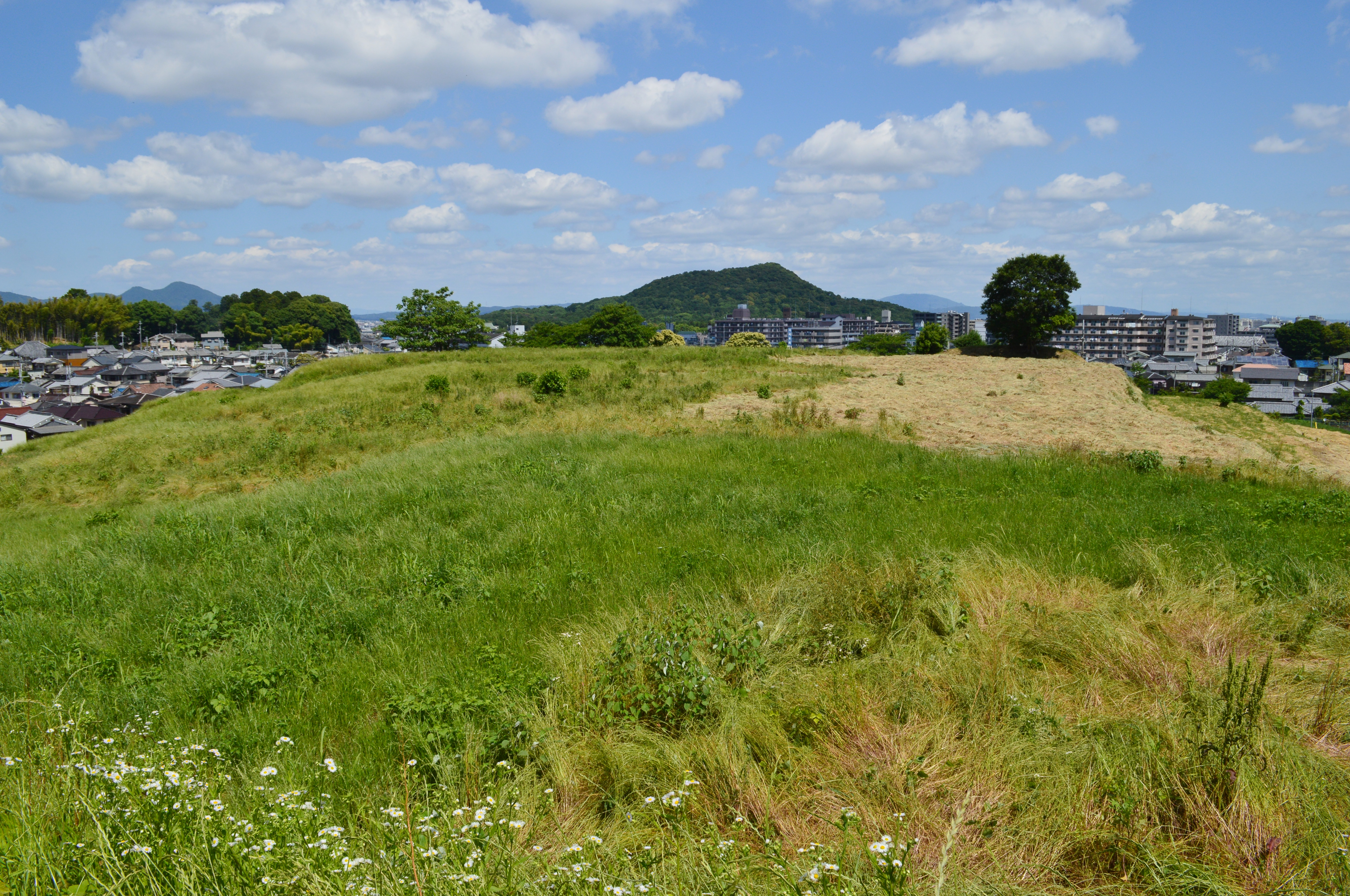
Front (viewed from the rear circular mound, with Mt. Unebi in the background)

== See also ==
- List of Historic Sites of Japan (Nara)
- Japanese imperial tombs
