= Mount Unebi =

Historic mountain in Kashihara, Japan

- 畝傍山
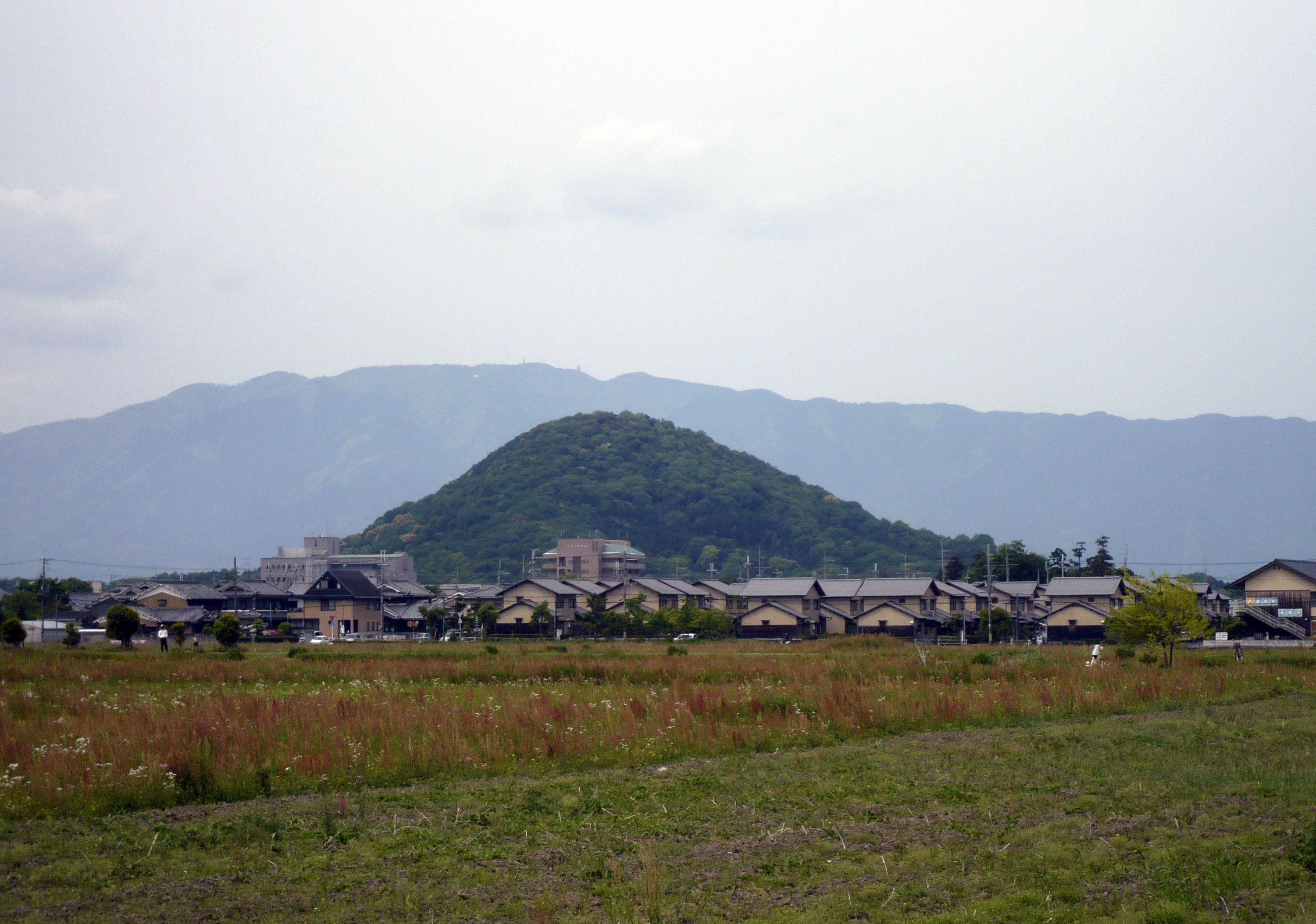
- View of Mount Unebi from Fujiwara Palace (4 May 2009).

Highest point
- Elevation: 198.8 m (652 ft)
- Listing: List of mountains in Japan; Yamato Sanzan
- Coordinates: 34°29′33″N 135°47′5″E

Naming
- English translation: Ridgeside Mountain
- Language of name: Japanese

Geography
- Location within Japan
- Location: Kashihara, Nara Prefecture, Japan

Mount Unebi (畝傍山, Unebi-yama) is a mountain in the city of Kashihara, in the central-western part Nara Prefecture, Japan. Together with Mount Amanokagu and Mount Miminashi, it belongs to the so-called "Yamato Sanzan", in which it is the highest. At the foot of the mountain are gneiss new rocks, and part of the middle slope and higher are biotite and andesite. At the top is a funnel of an extinct crater.
