= Mount Amanokagu =

Historic mountain in Kashihara, Japan

- 天香久山
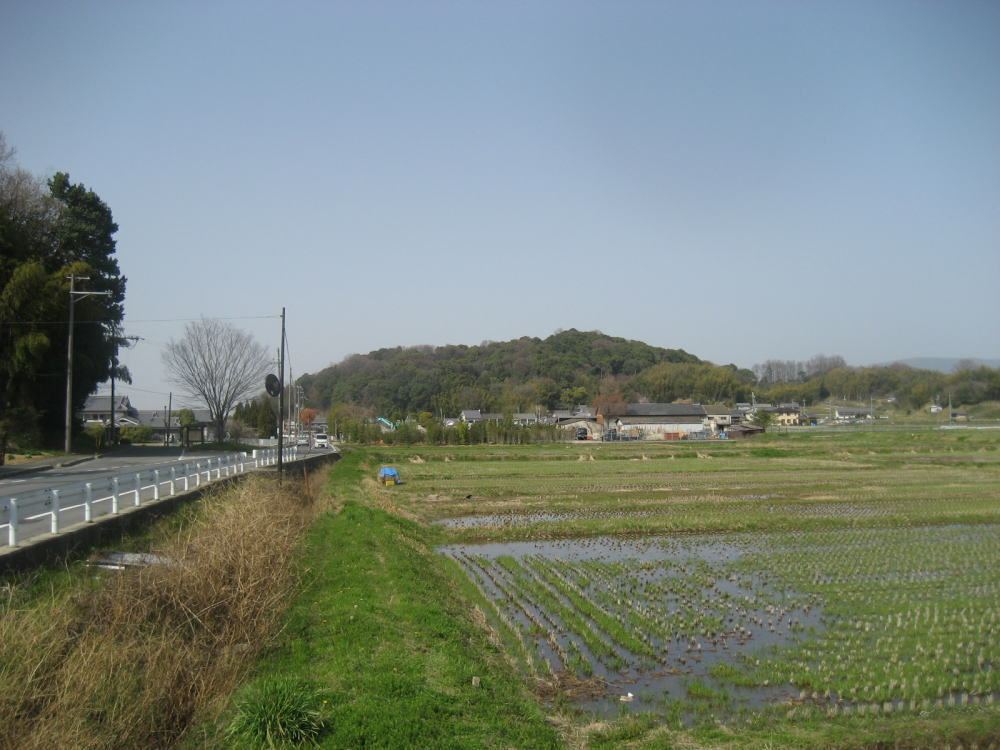
- View of Mount Amanokagu.

Highest point
- Elevation: 152.4 m (500 ft)
- Listing: List of mountains in Japan; Yamato Sanzan
- Coordinates: 34°29′45″N 135°49′6″E

Naming
- Language of name: Japanese

Geography
- Location within Japan
- Location: Kashihara, Nara Prefecture, Japan

Mount Amanokagu (天香久山, Amanokagu-yama) is a mountain in the city of Kashihara, in the central-western part Nara Prefecture, Japan. Together with Mount Unebi and Mount Miminashi, it belongs to the so-called "Yamato Sanzan". It is at the end of Ryumon Mountains that continues from Mount Tatake in comparison to the other two mountains being a sole peak.
