= Nara College of Arts =

Higher education institution in Nara Prefecture, Japan

Coordinates: 34°29′04″N 135°47′10″E

- 奈良芸術短期大学
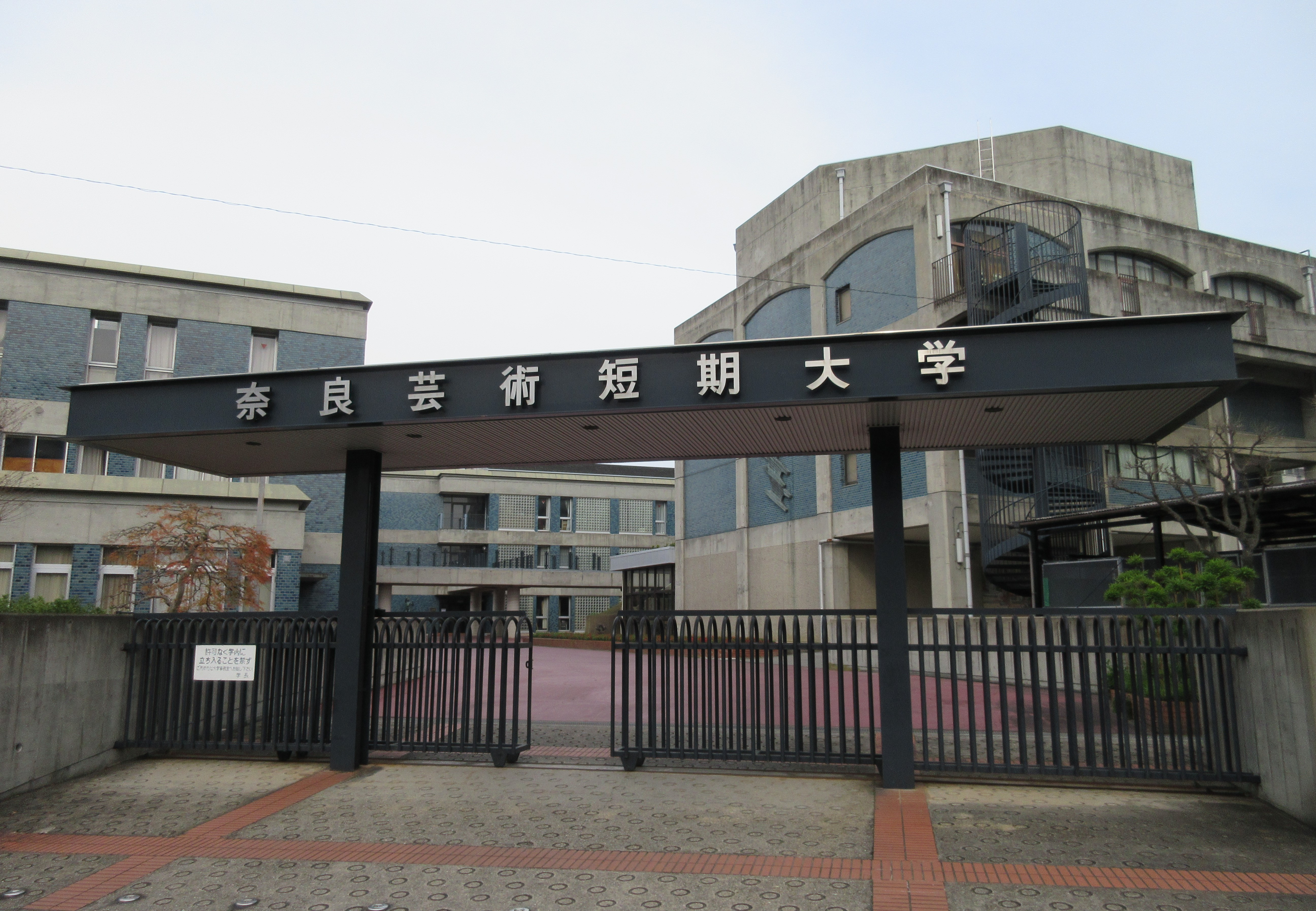
- Nara College of Arts
- Type: Private; Junior college
- Established: 1966
- Academic staff: Art
- Location: Kashihara Nara Prefecture, Japan

Nara College of Arts (奈良芸術短期大学, Nara Geijutsu Tanki daigaku) is a private junior college in the city of Kashihara in Nara Prefecture, Japan. It was established in 1966.
