= Yamato Sanzan =

Three historic mountains in Kashihara, Japan

Yamato Sanzan (大和三山) or "the three mountains of Yamato", in Kashihara, Nara Prefecture, Japan, are Mount Amanokagu (香具山), Mount Unebi (畝傍山), and Mount Miminashi (耳成山). Celebrated in Japanese poetry, they appear in such works as Man'yōshū and Harima no Kuni Fudoki, and they have been jointly designated a Place of Scenic Beauty. Jimmu, first Emperor of Japan, is said to have built his palace on the southeast side of Mt Unebi; he is enshrined at Kashihara Jingū. Archaeological study in the 1990s has shown that, rather than their surrounding Fujiwara-kyō on three sides, the "palace-city" was so large as to encompass the three mountains.

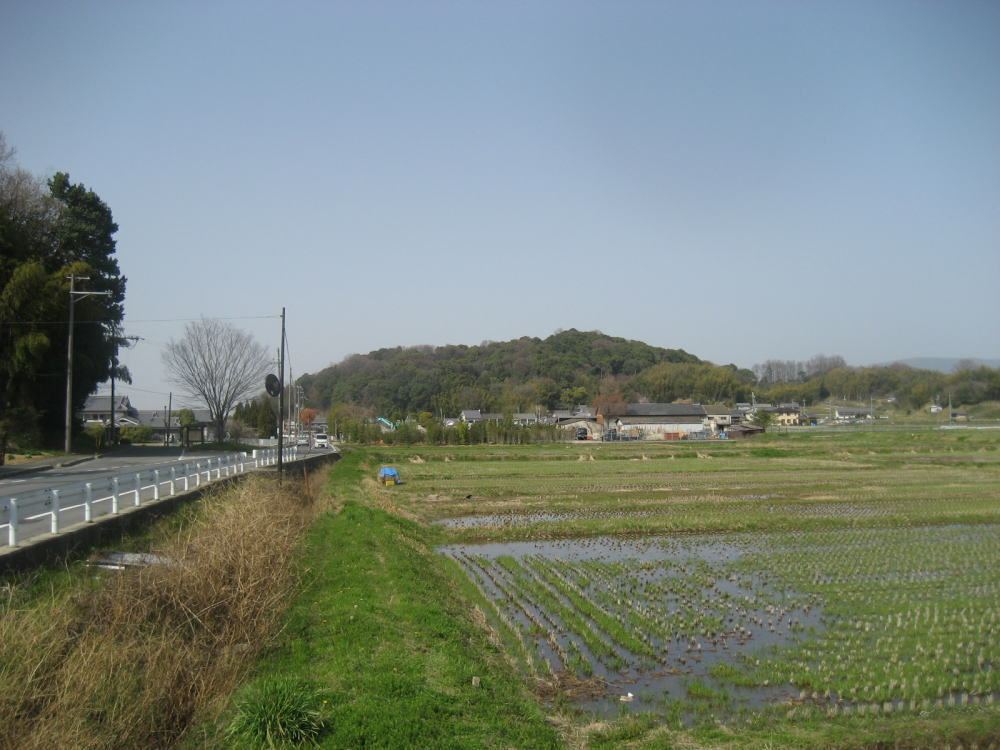
Mt Kagu (152.4 m) 34°29′43.5″N 135°49′05.5″E

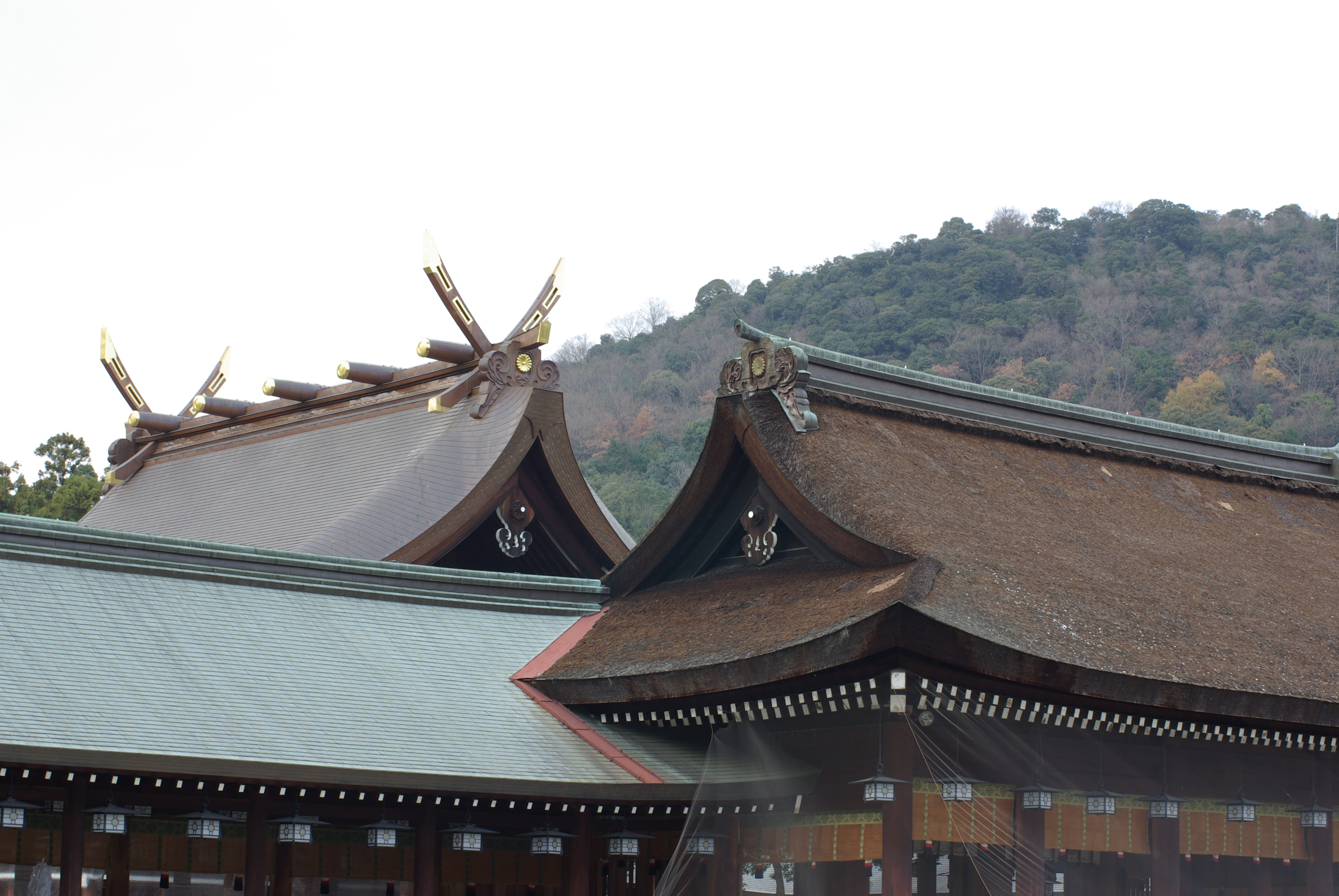
Mt Unebi (199.2 m) 34°29′32.5″N 135°47′06″E

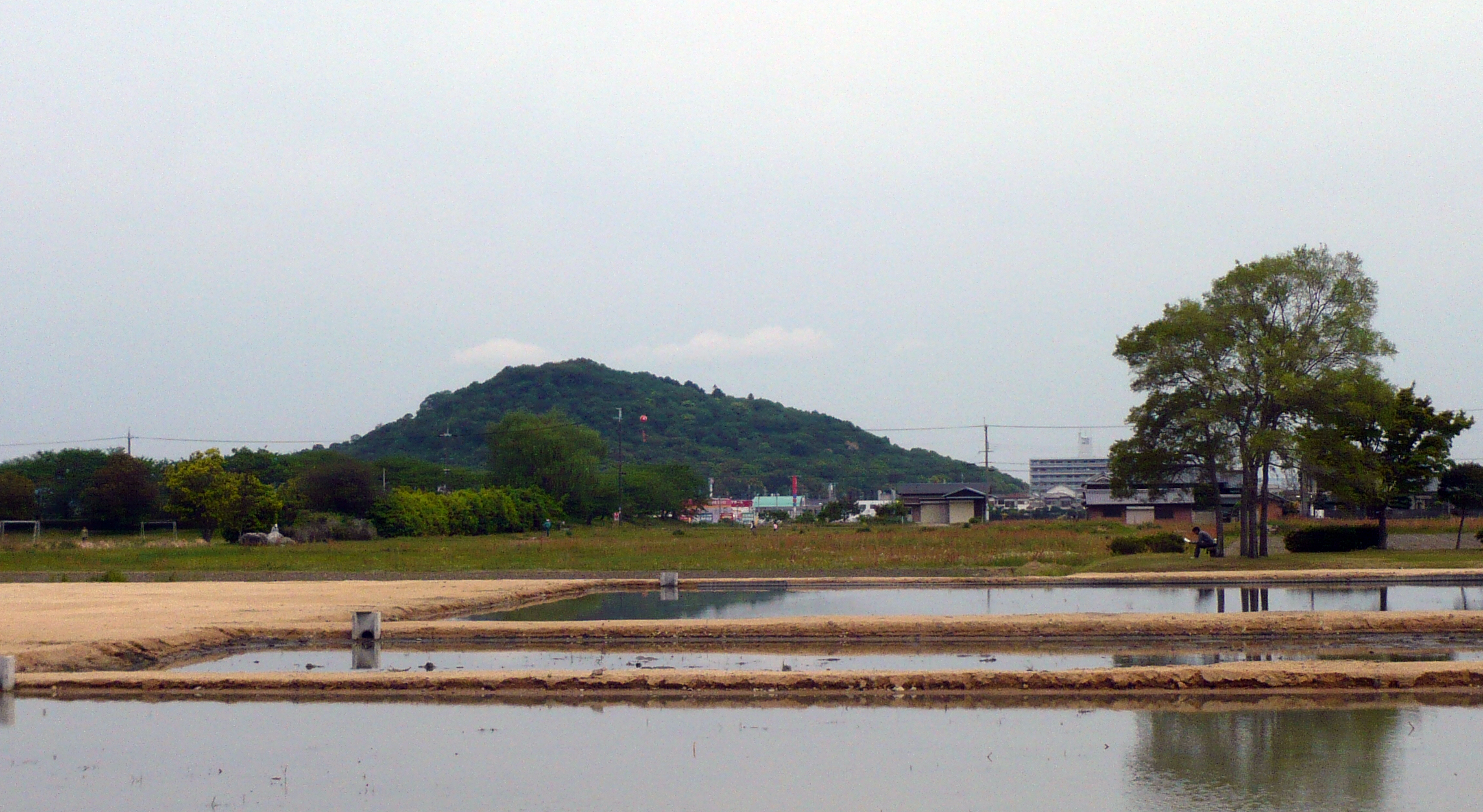
Mt Miminashi (139.7 m) 34°30′53″N 135°48′20″E

== See also ==
- Monuments of Japan
- List of Special Places of Scenic Beauty, Special Historic Sites and Special Natural Monuments
- Meisho
- Utamakura
- Kunimi (practice)
