= Moto Yakushi-ji =

Archaeological site in Japan

Moto-Yakushi-ji
- 本薬師寺 (Japanese)
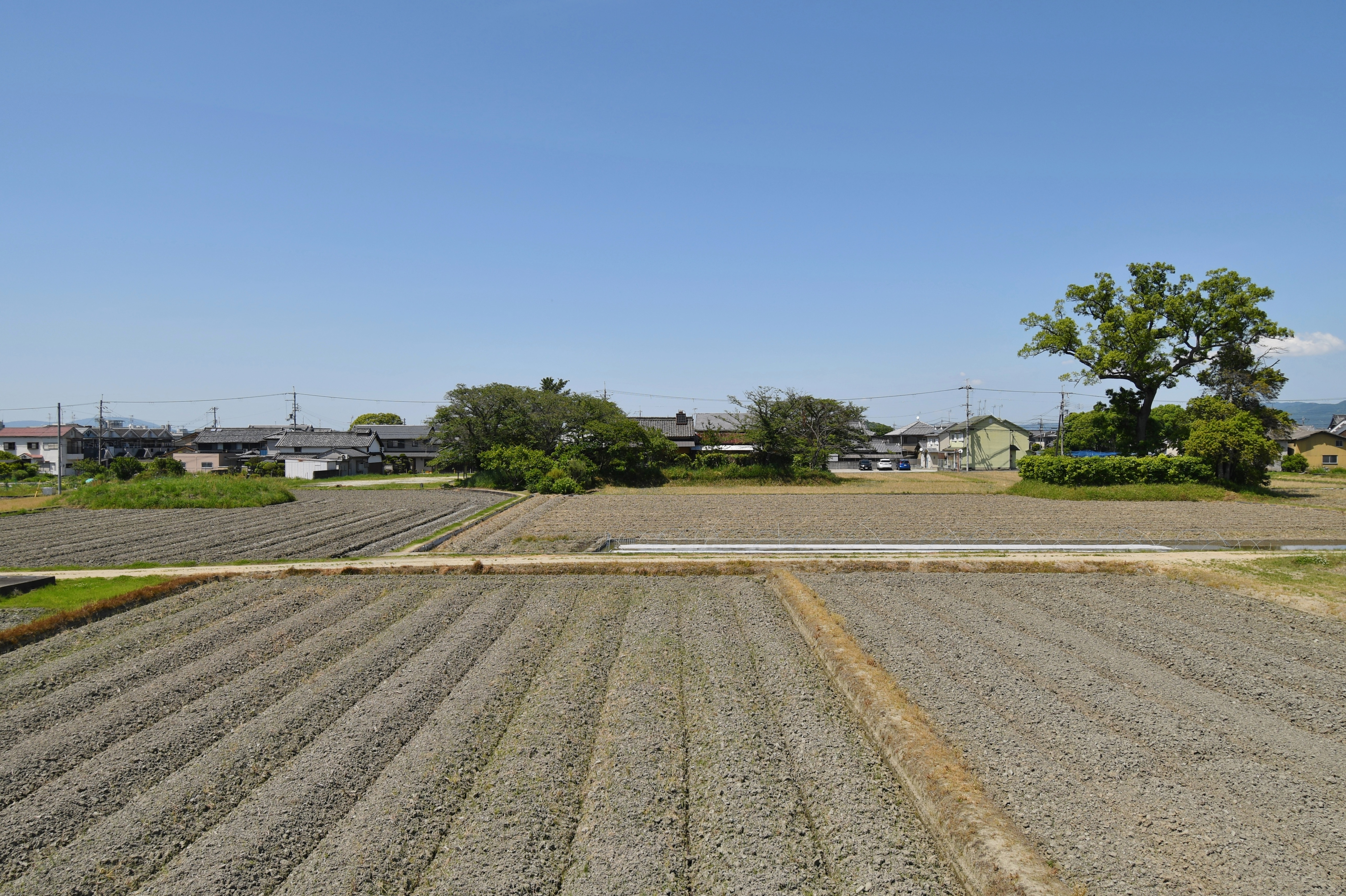
- Moto-Yakushi-ji ruins

- Moto-Yakushi-ji ruins Moto Yakushi-ji (Japan)
- Interactive map of Moto-Yakushi-ji
- 34°29′34″N 135°48′01″E
- Type: temple ruins
- Periods: Asuka period
- Location: Kashihara, Nara, Japan
- Region: Kansai region

History
- Built: c.695 AD

Site notes
- Public access: Yes

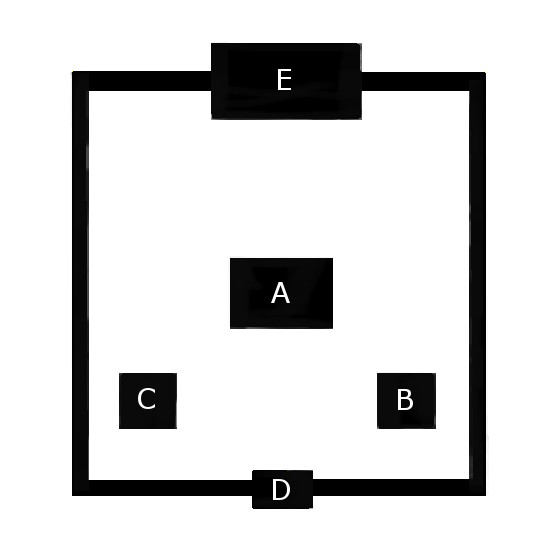
Layout, A=Kondo, B=East Pagoda, C=West Pagoda, D=Middle Gate, E=Lecture Hall

Moto-Yakushi-ji ruins (本薬師寺, Moto-Yakushi-ji ato) is an archaeological site with the ruins of an Asuka period Buddhist temple located in the city of Kashihara, Nara, Japan. It was designated as a National Historic Site in 1921, with the classification changed to Special Historic Site in 1952. It is the predecessor of the famous Yakushi-ji in Nara, and its name "Moto Yakushi-ji" (元薬師寺 moto, "original Yakushi-ji"), and the site is now a Special National Historic Site.

== History ==
Per the Nihon Shoki and other historical sources, construction of the original Yakushi-ji began in 682 (the 11th year of Emperor Tenmu's reign) in Fujiwara-kyō. The Fujiwara capital was built during this time on the Chinese model, with hopes of improving economic stability and centralization of government as well as a strong military. According to the Nihon Shoki, Yakushi-ji was commissioned by Emperor Tenmu in 680 as an offering for the recovery from illness of his consort, Princess Uno-no-Sarara, who succeeded him as Empress Jitō, and after he ordered 100 monks to be ordained, she recovered from her illness. This act of building temples in devotion to Buddhist figures was a common practice among Japanese nobility after Buddhism was first imported from China and Korea. However, he died before its completion and Empress Jitō completed the complex, although construction continued to around 698, during the rein of Emperor Monmu.

The historical accounts are supported by archaeological excavations, where were carried out in 1976, 1984, 1990, and 1992-1996, based on pottery and roof tiles found at the site. Furthermore, dendrochronology of wood used for the construction of the eastern pagoda confirm that it was cut in 695, which coincides with the date when the temple complex was supposedly completed.

When the capital was relocated to Heijō-kyō, the major Buddhist temples also relocated. In many cases the existing buildings were disassembled and reconstructed on the new site. It was long believed that this was also the case with Yakushi-ji, based partly on documents such as the Yakushiji Engi; however, other documents indicate that a Yakushi-ji continued to exist at Asuka until the 11th century, and this is now supported by archaeological evidence. Although the size and layout of the temple buildings is almost identical between the two sites, and the eaves roof tiles were found to be identical, the flat tiles were different, and there were many small differences in the construction of buildings various buildings.

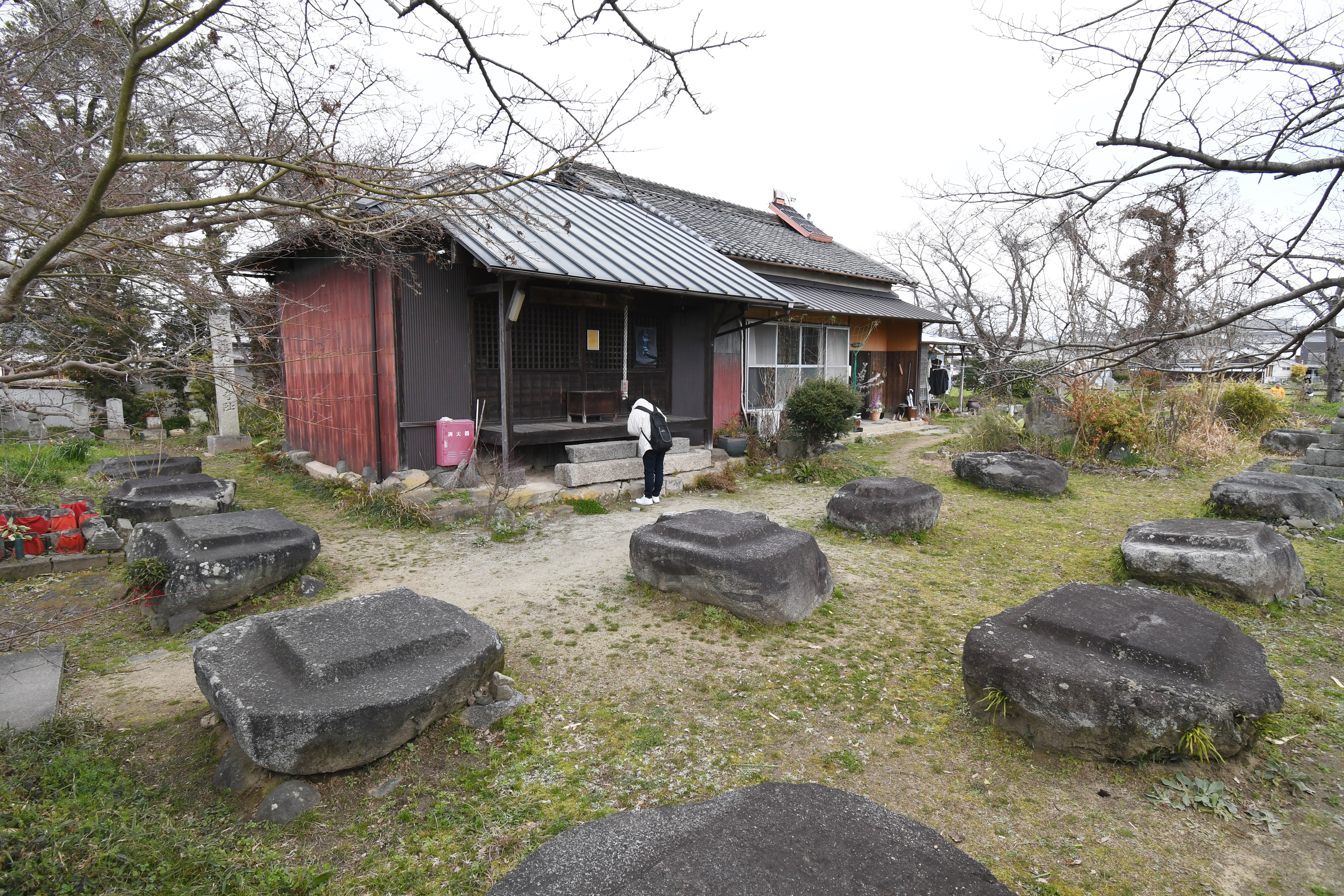
Io-in in Kashhara, with pilfered foundation stones from Moto-Yakushi-ji Kondo

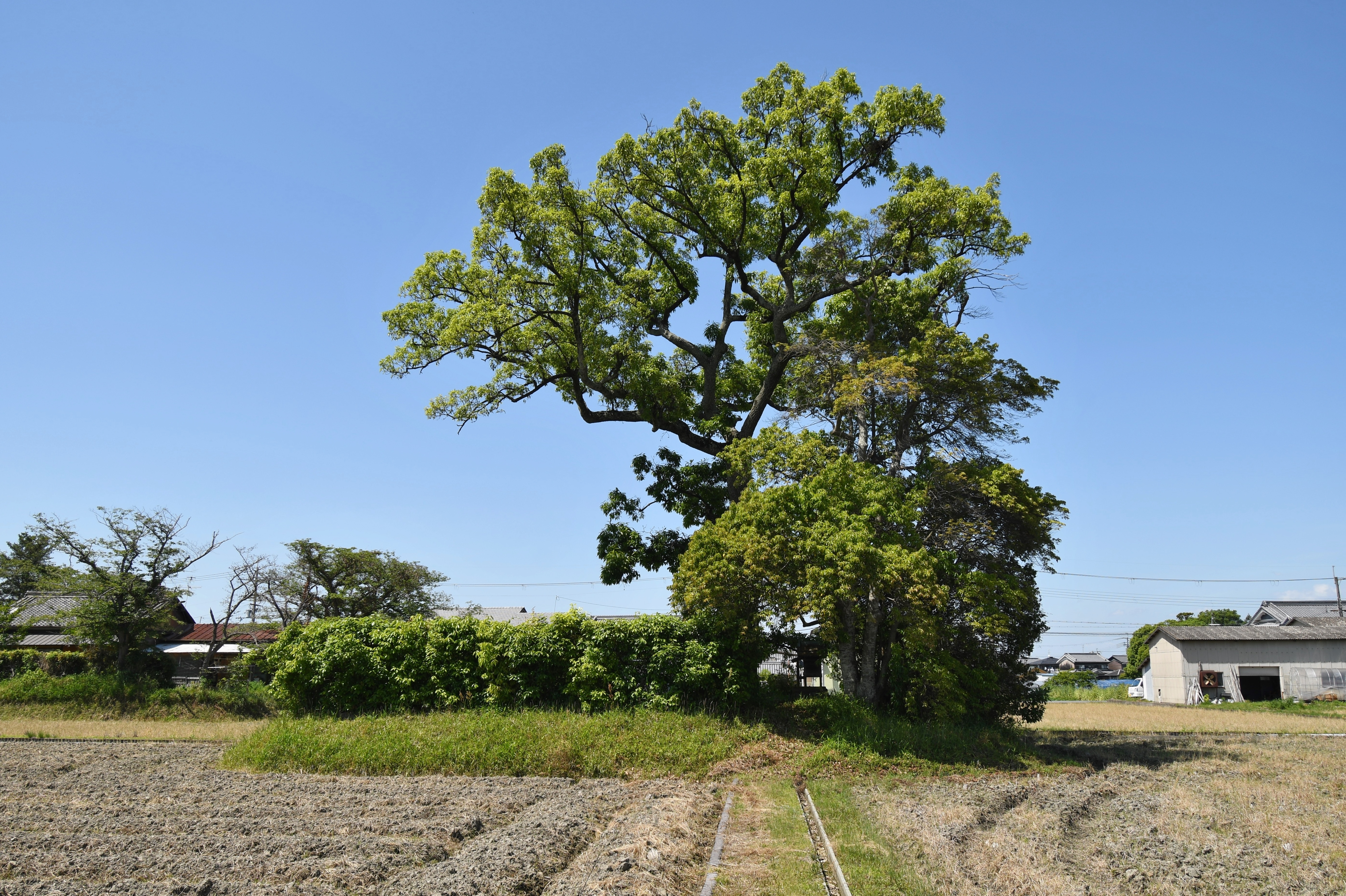
East Pagoda Site

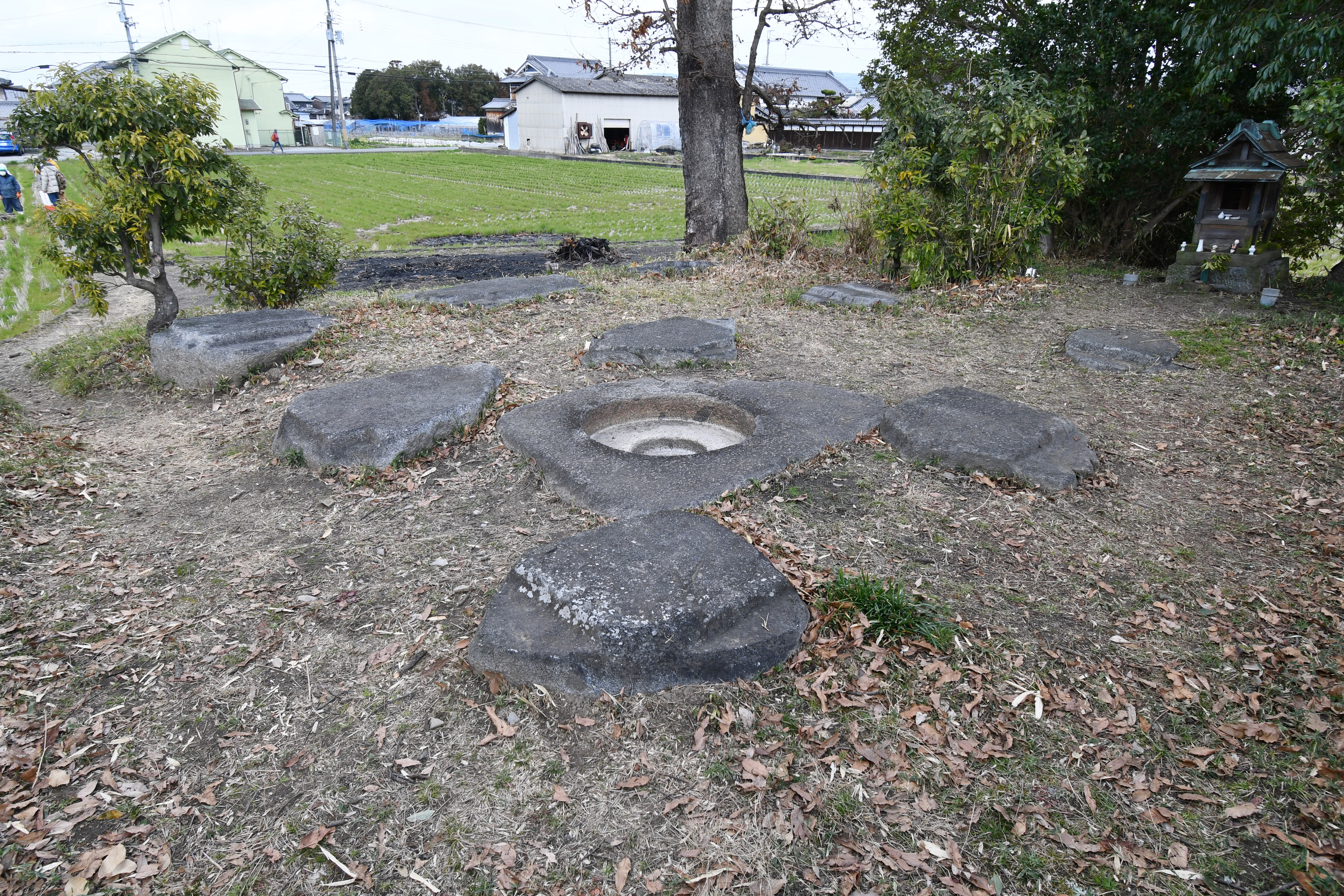
East Pagoda foundations

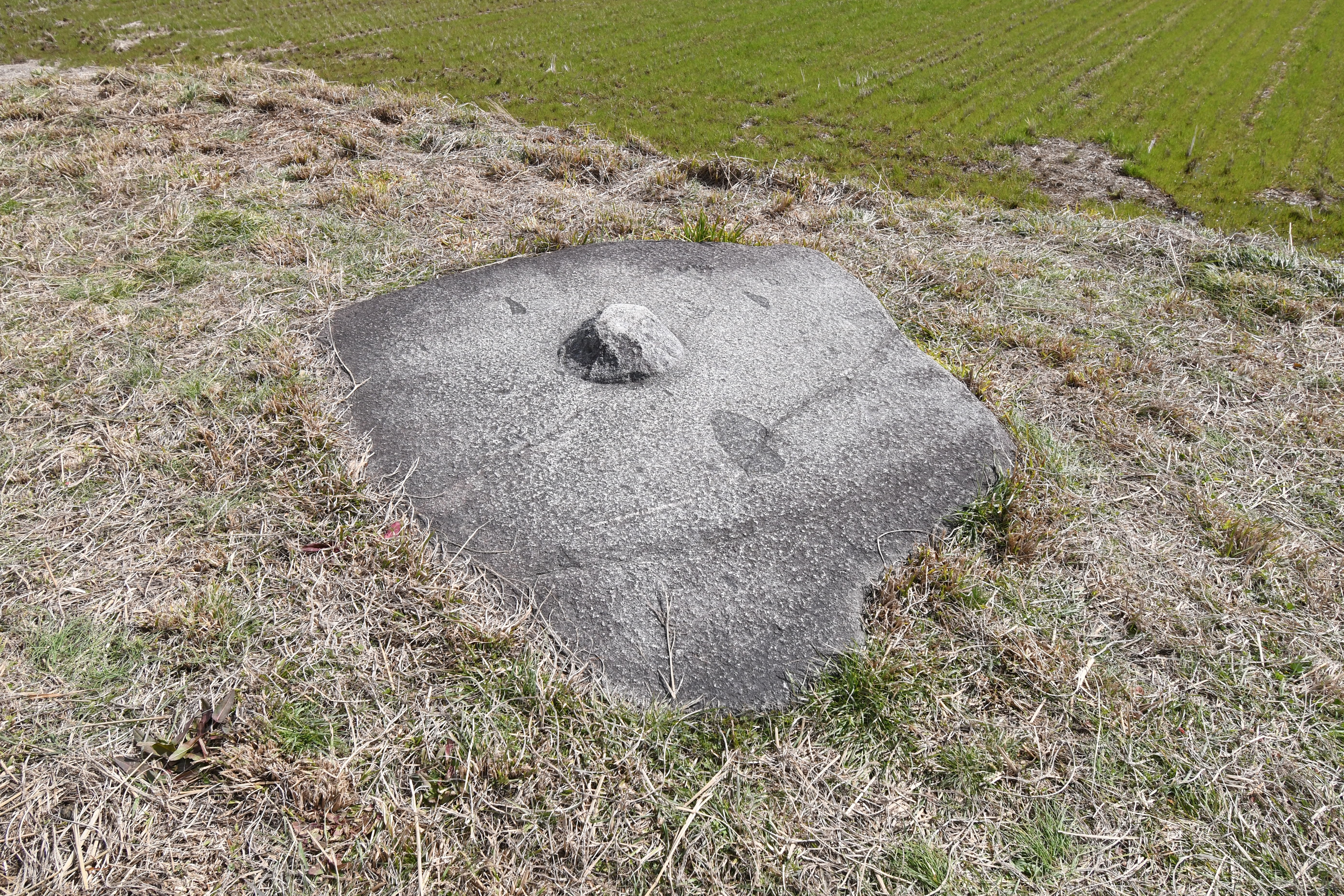
West Pagoda central foundation stone

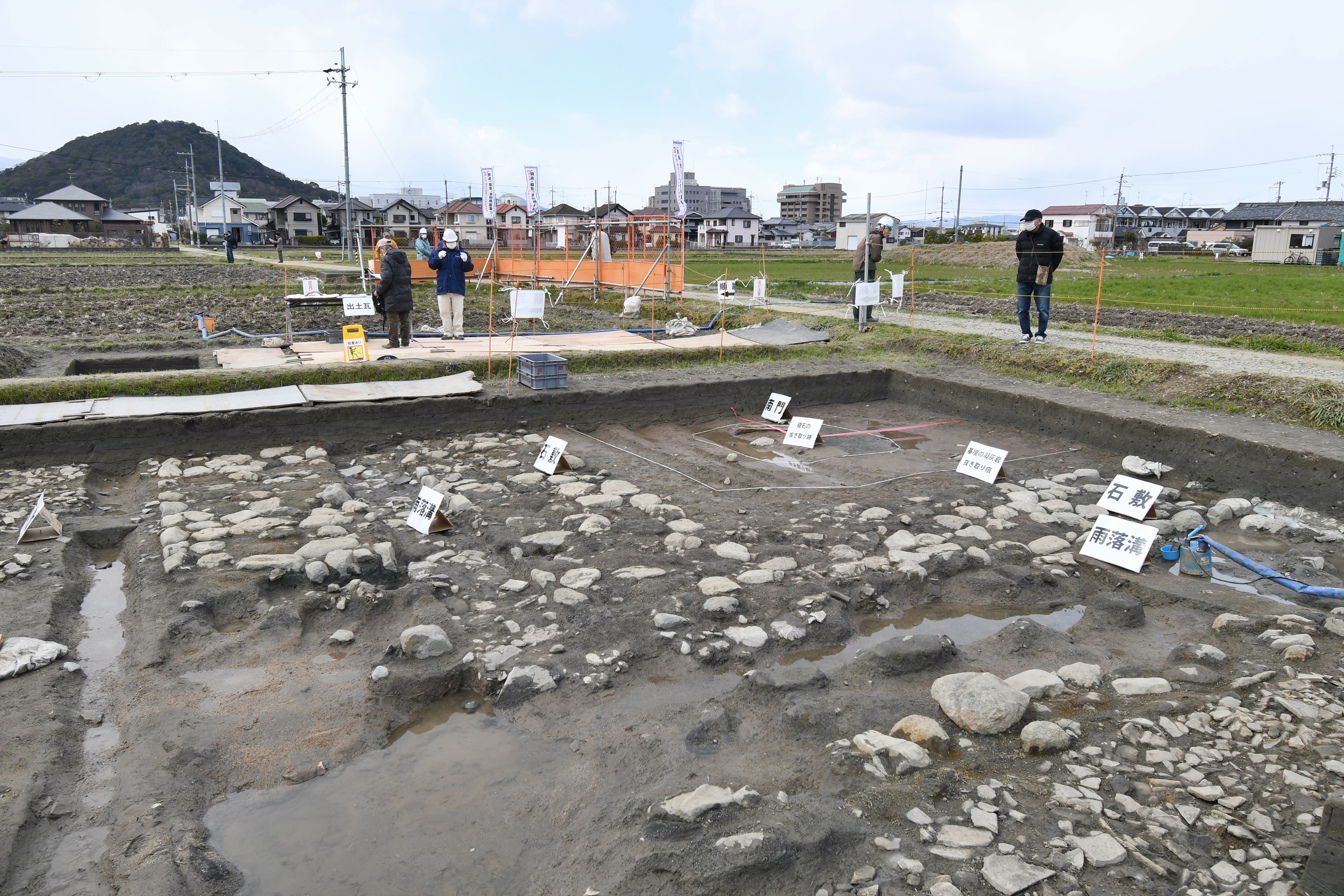
South Gate excavation

The Moto-Yakushi-ji was laid out in the "Yakushi-ji style", with the Middle Gate, Kondo and Lecture Hall in a south-north axis. A cloister connected the sides of the Middle Gate and Lecture Hall, forming a courtyard surrounding the Kondo. To the south of the Kondo were twin pagodas. The current Kondo site is a little over one meter higher than the surrounding rice fields, and is an earthen platform 36 meters east-west and 29 meters north-south. There were 19 foundation stones with square bases made of granite, four of which were removed and reused at the Io-in temple in Kashihara. Based on the arrangement of the foundation stones, the Kondo can be estimated to have been the same size as the current Kondo of the Yakushi-ji in Nara.

The East Pagoda foundations are 14.2 meters on each side and 1.45 meters high, which is almost the same size as Yakushi-ji in Nara. The base had stairs in the center of all four sides and was covered with tuff. A total of 16 foundation stones remain, including the central stone measuring 2.1 by 1.7 meters. The West Pagoda foundations are 13.5 meters on each side and 1.6 meters high. The granite core stone remains, but is different from that of the East Pagoda or its counterpart in Nara. A large number of roof tiles from the Yakushi-ji in Nara were excavated from the site of the Western Pagoda, suggested that the West Pagoda of MotoYakushi-ji may have been rebuilt after the temple was moved to Heijō-kyō. The Middle Gate at Moto-Yakushi-ji was three bays wide and two bays long, smaller than the Middle Gate of Yakushi-ji in Nara (five by two bays). The South Gate was excavated in 2024.

The Moto-Yakushi-ji temple ruins are about a five minute walk from Unebigoryomae Station on the Kintetsu Railway Kashihara Line.

== See also ==
- List of Historic Sites of Japan (Nara)
