= Kashihara =

Kashihara 橿原市
- City
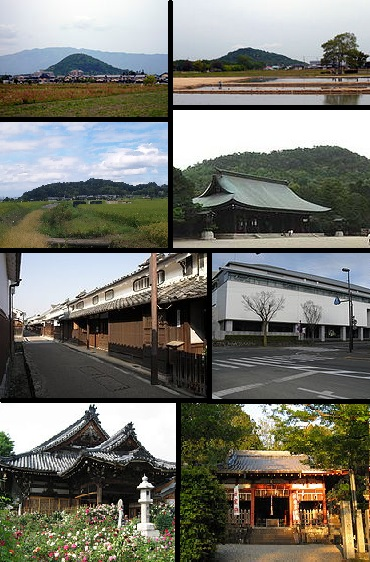
- Left: Mount Unebi, Mount Amanokaga, Imai heritage old house site, Ofusa Kannon Temple, Right: Mount Miminashi, Kashihara Shrine, Kashihara Archaeological, Institute, Unebi-yamaguchi Shrine (all item from above to bottom)

- Flag Emblem

- Location in Japan
- Coordinates: 34°30′34″N 135°48′33″E
- Country: Japan
- Region: Kansai
- Prefecture: Nara

Government
  - Mayor: Yutaka Morishita

Area
  - Total: 39.56 km^{2} (15.27 sq mi)

Population (October 1, 2024)
  - Total: 118,674
  - Density: 3,000/km^{2} (7,770/sq mi)
- Time zone: UTC+09:00 (JST)
- City hall address: 1-1-18 Yagi-chō, Kashihara-shi, Nara-ken 634-8586
- Website: Official website
- Symbols
- Flower: Common gardenia
- Tree: Oak

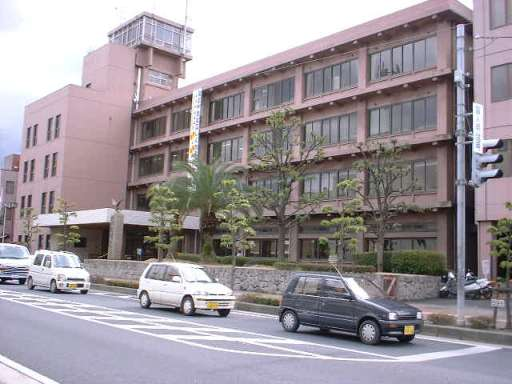
Kashihara City Hall

Kashihara (橿原市, Kashihara-shi) is a city located in Nara Prefecture, Japan. As of 1 October 2024, the city had an estimated population of 118,674 in 56,013 households, and a population density of 3000 persons per km^{2}. The total area of the city is 39.56 km^{2} (15.27 sq mi). A number of historical sites in Kashihara are listed on the UNESCO World Heritage (Cultural Heritage) Tentative List as "The Asuka and Fujiwara Imperial Capitals and Related Properties," including the remains of Fujiwara-kyō, Hon-Yakushi-ji temple ruins, Maruyama Kofun, and the Yamato Sanzan.

== Geography ==
Kashihara is located at the southern edge of the Nara Basin. The city encompasses the Yamato Sanzan, "the three mountains of Yamato", (Mount Amanokagu (香具山), Mount Unebi (畝傍山), and Mount Miminashi (耳成山)), which are celebrated in Japanese poetry, and have been jointly designated a Place of Scenic Beauty.

=== Surrounding municipalities ===
Nara Prefecture

- Gose
- Sakurai
- Yamatotakada
- Kōryō
- Tawaramoto
- Asuka
- Takatori

=== Climate ===
Kashihara has a humid subtropical climate (Köppen Cfa) characterized by warm summers and cool winters with light to no snowfall. The average annual temperature in Kashihara is 14.2 °C. The average annual rainfall is 1636 mm with September as the wettest month. The temperatures are highest on average in August, at around 26.2 °C, and lowest in January, at around 2.8 °C.

=== Demographics ===
Per Japanese census data, the population of Kashihara is as shown below

Historical population
| Year | Pop. | ±% |
|---|---|---|
| 1960 | 49,954 | — |
| 1970 | 75,508 | +51.2% |
| 1980 | 107,316 | +42.1% |
| 1990 | 115,554 | +7.7% |
| 2000 | 125,005 | +8.2% |
| 2010 | 125,605 | +0.5% |
| 2020 | 120,922 | −3.7% |

== History ==
The area of Kashihara was the center of ancient Yamato Province, and contains many kofun burial mounds. The exact spot of Emperor Jimmu's accession to the imperial throne (i.e. the foundation of Japan) was debated for centuries until in 1863 scholars of national studies claimed to have identified an area within Kashihara as the exact location. The city was the location of the Imperial capital Fujiwara-kyō, from 694 to 710. During the Sengoku period, Imai-cho was a fortified city surrounded by a moat as a missionary base for the Ikko sect of Buddhism which fought against the army of Oda Nobunaga, but was disarmed, but was allowed to exercise jurisdiction and developed into an autonomous city. In the late 16th century it was said to be one of the two richest autonomous cities of Japan, as in Umi no Sakai, Riku no Imai (tr. "by the sea, Sakai – inland, Imai" - Imai or ja:今井町 is now a part of Kashihara).

The town of Imai was established on April 1, 1889 with the creation of the modern municipalities system. It was raised to city status on February 11, 1956 by merging with the towns of Yagi and Unebi and the villages of Masuge, Kamoko and Maminashi. The city annexed the villages of Kanahashi and Shinzawa on July 3, 1956.

On 8 July 2022, after former Japanese Prime Minister Shinzo Abe was shot while campaigning in Nara City, he was taken to Nara Medical University Hospital in Kashihara for treatment, but died there.

== Government ==
Kashihara has a mayor-council form of government with a directly elected mayor and a unicameral city council of 23 members. Kashihara collectively with the municipalities of Takaichi District contributes four members to the Nara Prefectural Assembly. In terms of national politics, the town is part of the Nara 3rd district of the lower house of the Diet of Japan.

== Economy ==
The local economy is based on agriculture and light manufacturing, including pharmaceuticals and automobile components.

== Education ==
Kashihara has 15 public elementary schools and six public junior high school operated by the city government and two public high schools operated by the Nara Prefectural Board of Education. There are also two private high schools. The Nara Medical University and the Nara College of Arts are both located in Kashihara.

== Transportation ==
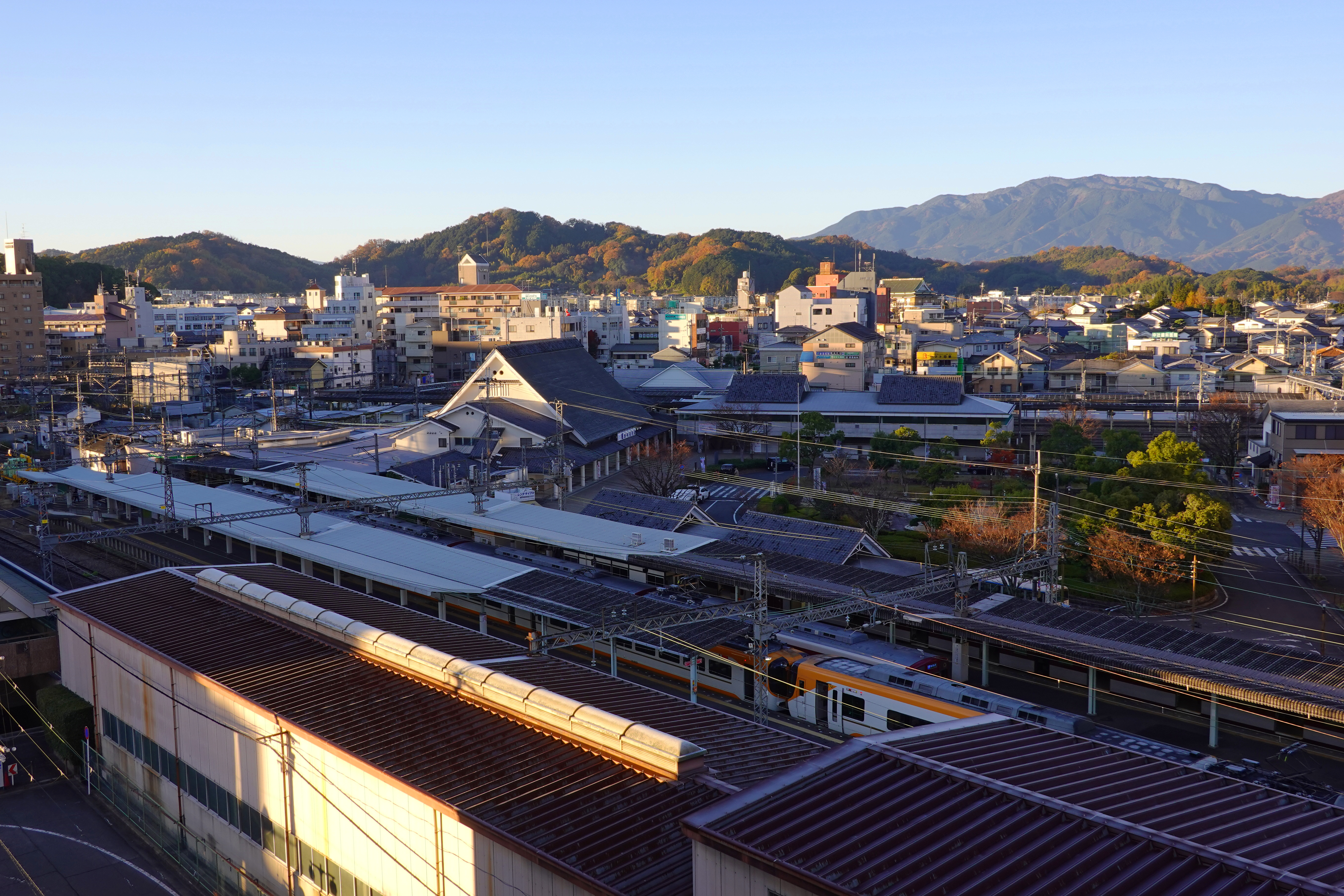
Kashiharajingu-mae Station

=== Railways ===
JR West – Sakurai Line

U Kaguyama - Unebi - Kanahashi

Kintetsu Railway - Kashihara Line

Ninokuchi - Yamato-Yagi - Yagi-nishiguchi - Unebigoryōmae - Kashiharajingū-mae

Kintetsu Railway - Osaka Line

Masuga - Yamato-Yagi - Miminashi

Kintetsu Railway - Minami Osaka Line

Bojo - Kashiharajingū-nishiguchi - Kashiharajingu-mae

Kintetsu Railway - Yoshino Line

Kashiharajingu-mae - Okadera

=== Highways ===
- Keinawa Expressway
- National Route 24
- National Route 165
- National Route 166
- National Route 169

== Sister city relations ==
- Luoyang, Henan Province, China, friendship city since February 2006.

== Local attractions ==
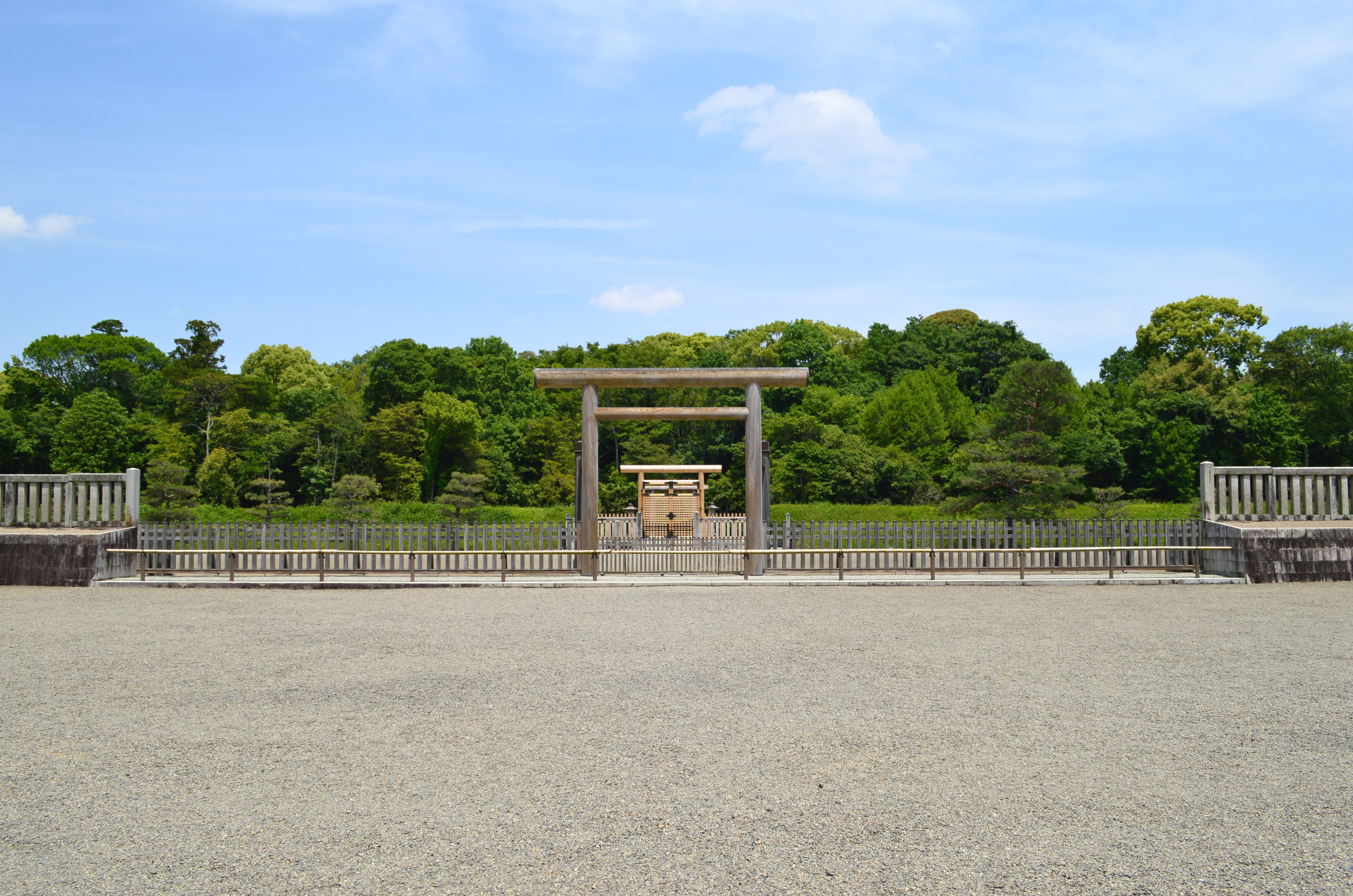
Tomb of Emperor Jimmu

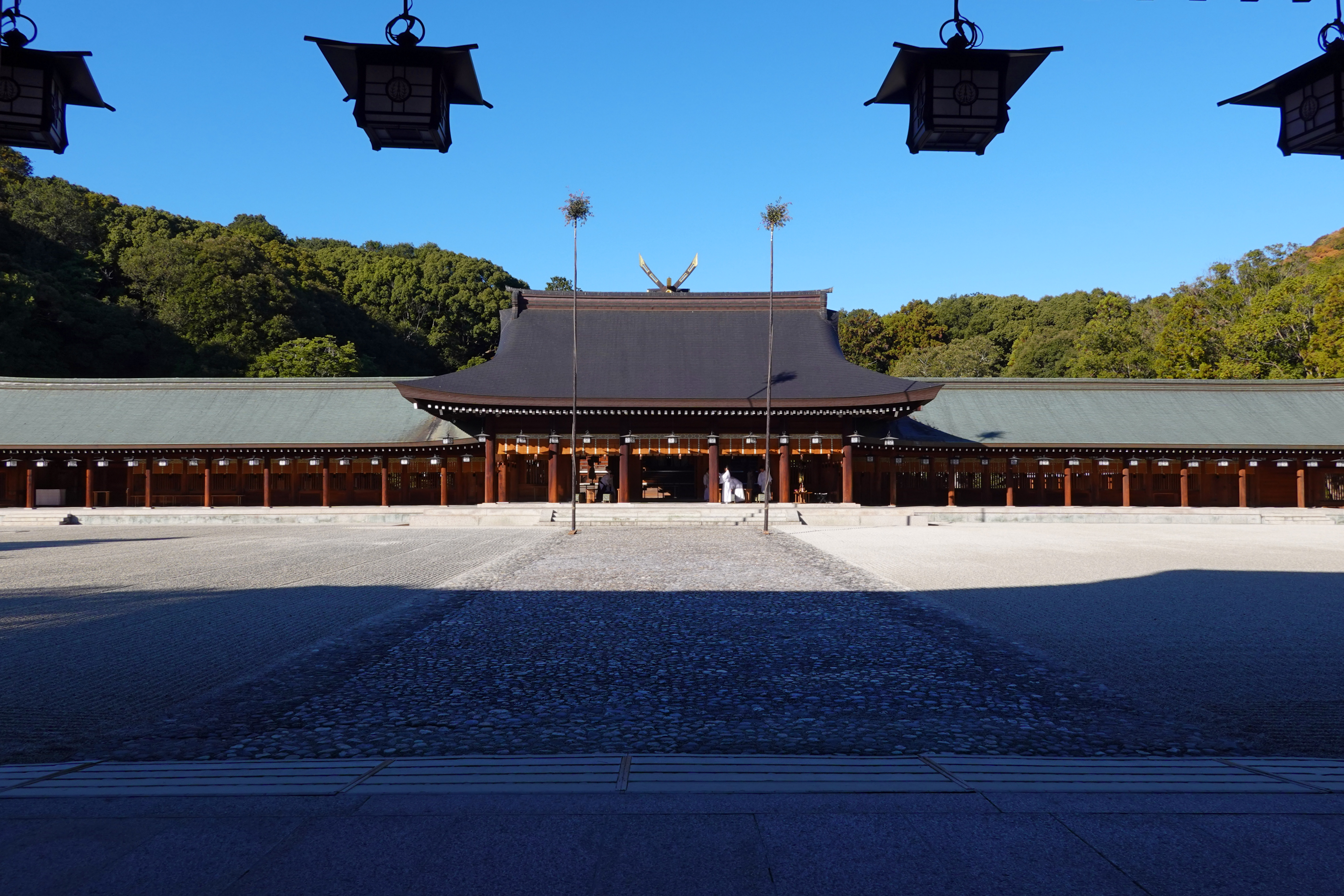
Kashihara Shrine

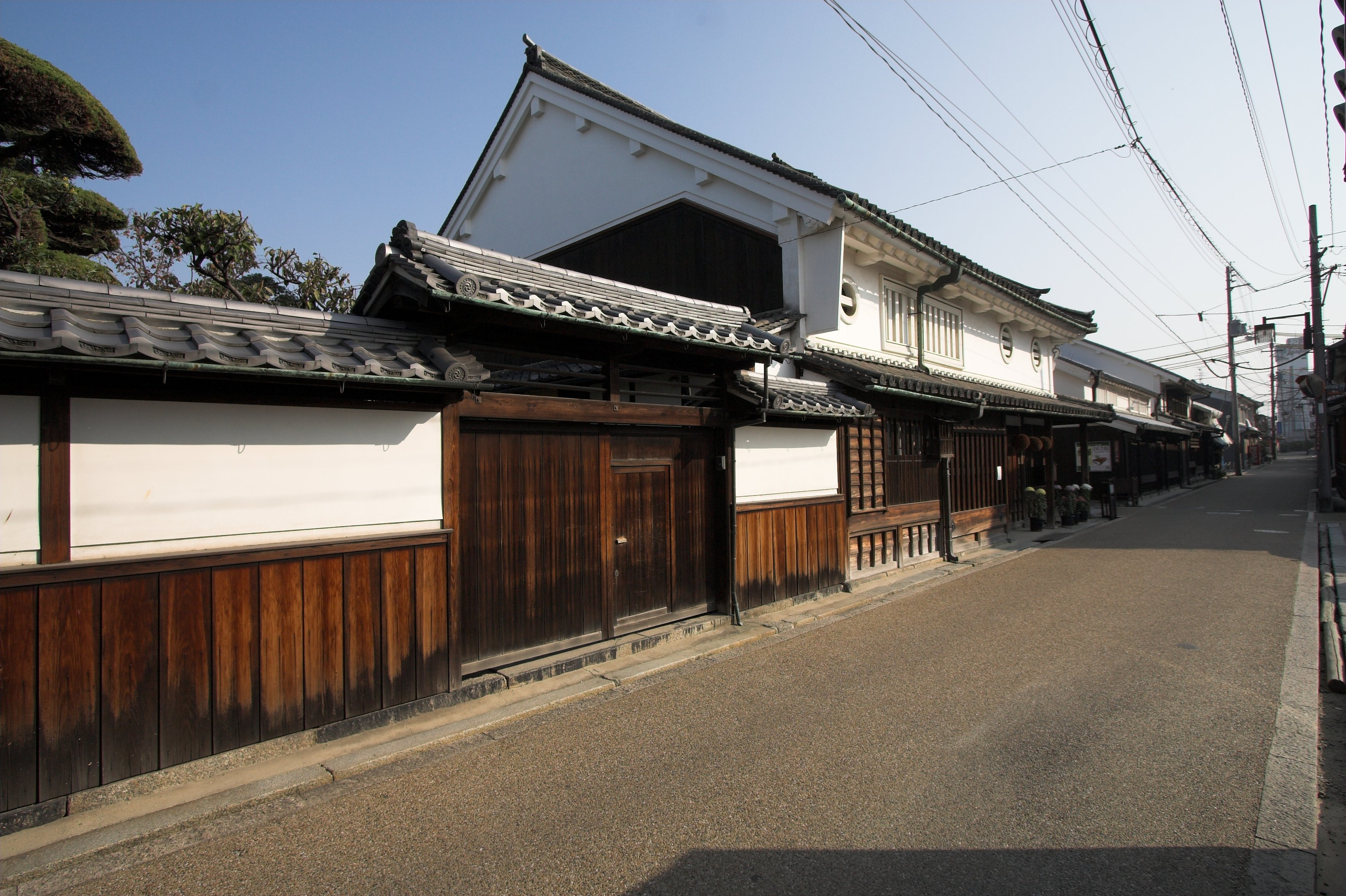
Imai-cho

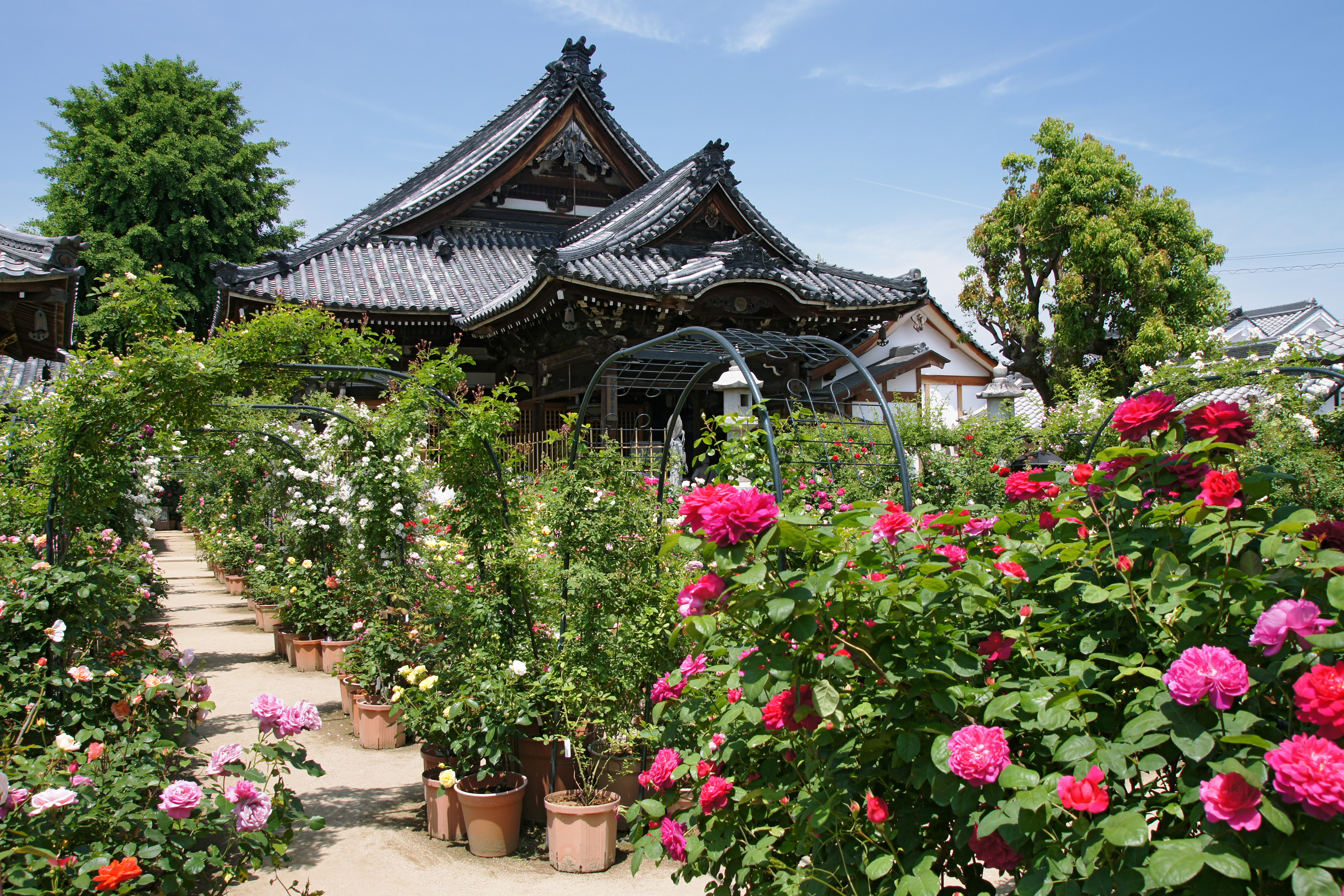
Ofusa Kannon

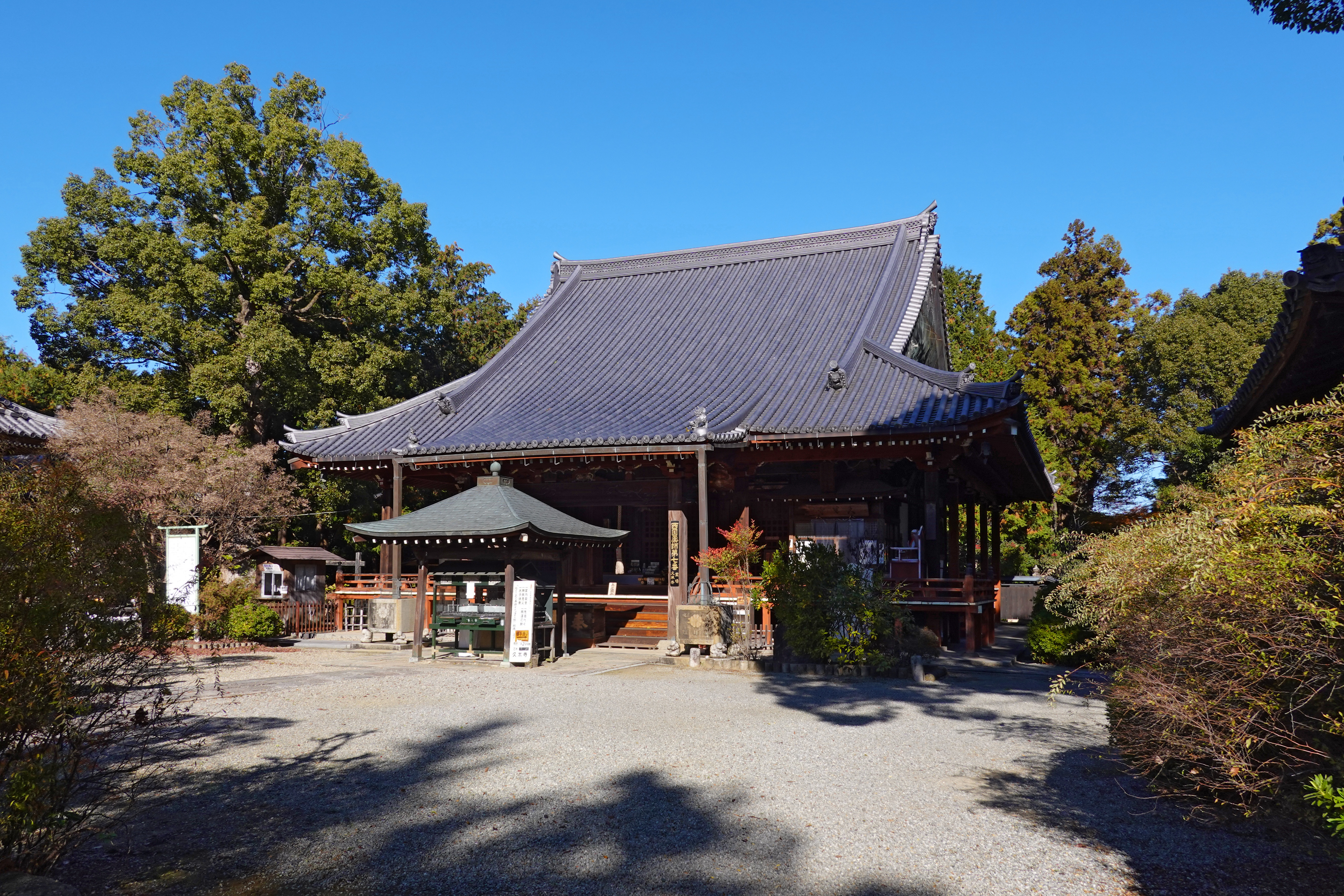
Kmune-dera

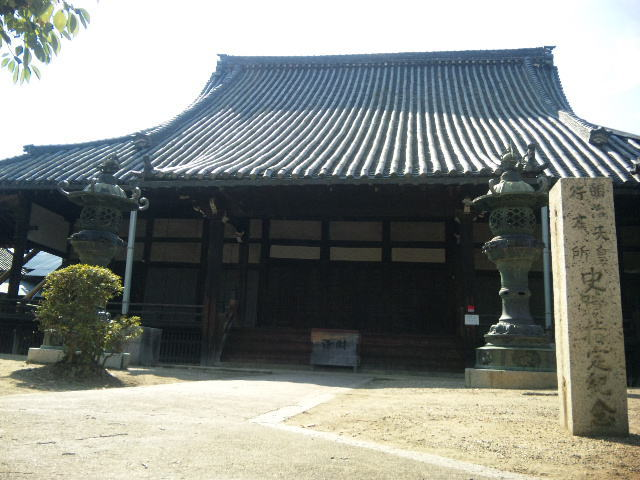
Shonen-ji

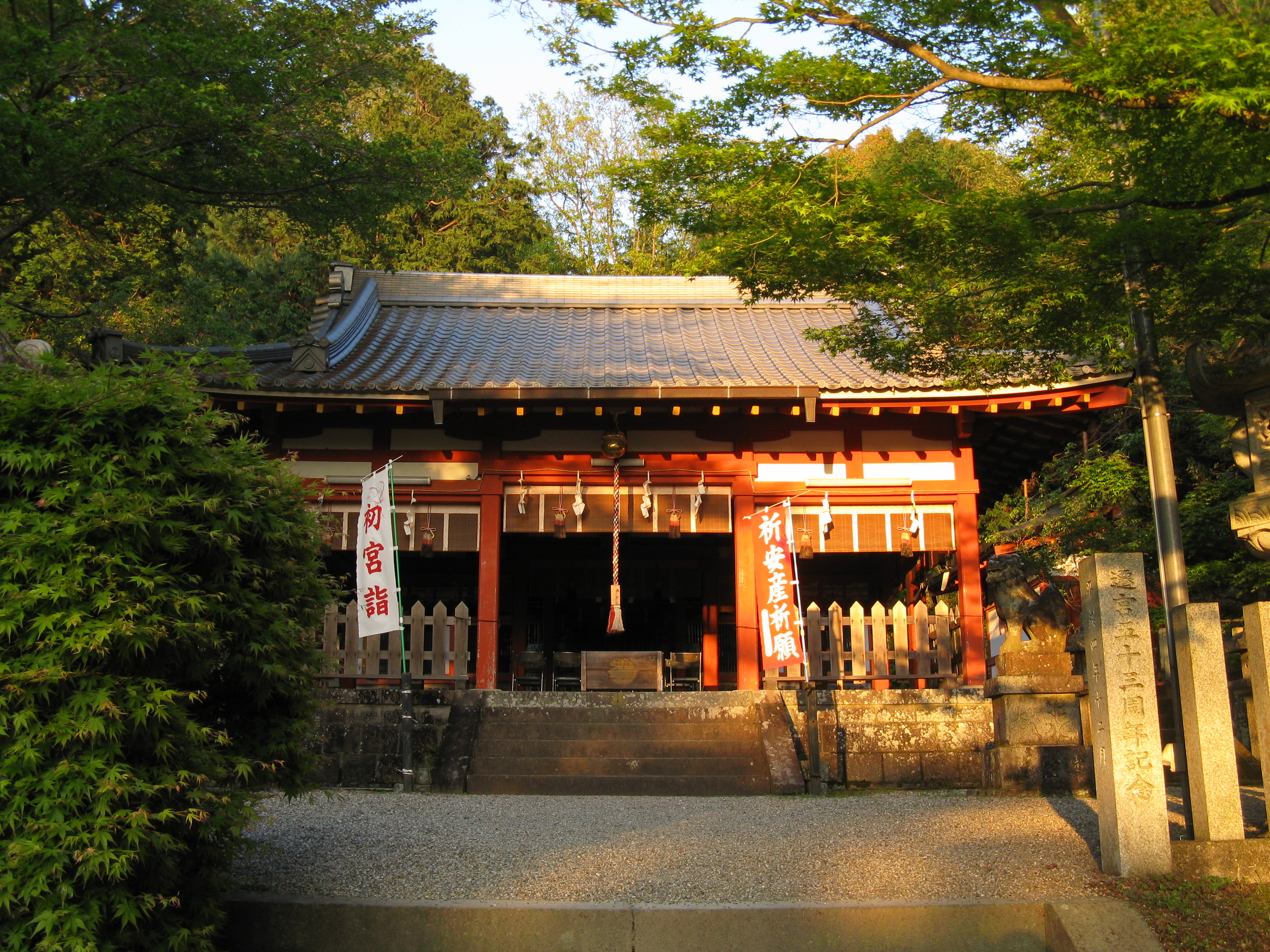
Unebiyamaguchi Jinja

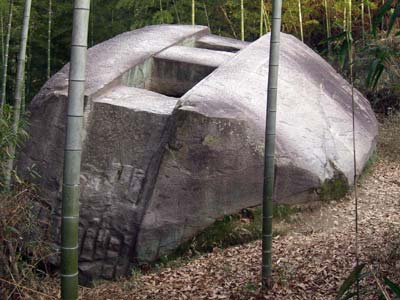
Masuda Iwafune

=== National Historic Sites ===
- Fujiwara-kyō ruins
- Moto Yakushi-ji temple ruins
- Maruyama Kofun
- Shōbuike Kofun
- Ueyama Kofun
- Shōbuike Kofun

=== Shrines and temples ===
- Kashihara Shrine
