= Yagi (Kashihara) =

Part of Kashihara, Nara, Japan

Coordinates: 34°30′41″N 135°47′33″E

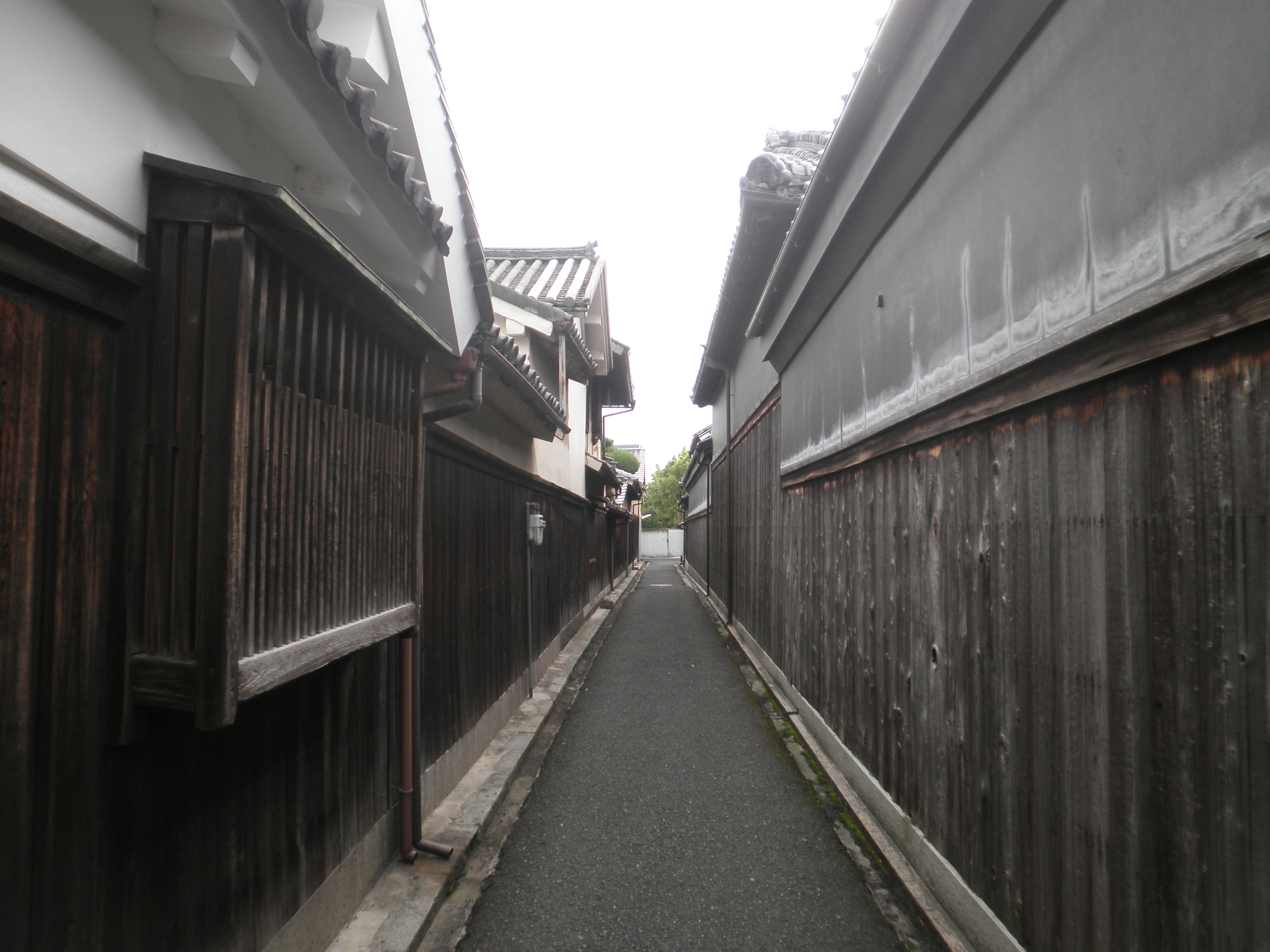
A narrow street in Yagi, Kashihara

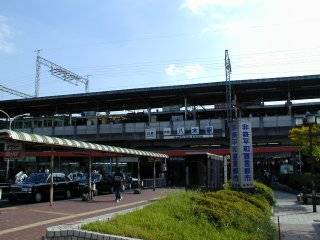
Yamato-Yagi Station

Yagi (八木) is a part of Kashihara, located in Nara, Japan.

== History ==
According to ancient texts (Nihonshoki and Kojiki), Yagi has a significant place in Japan's history. The first emperor, Emperor Jimmu, journeyed from Miyazaki Prefecture to Kashihara, making his way through the Yoshino mountains and eventually choosing the east side of Mount Unebi (2 kilometres from central Yagi) for his palace site. However, before securing the Unebi location, the armies of Emperor Jimmu were caught up in battle. Hopelessly outnumbered, legend has it that Jimmu's army was saved when a golden kite swept down from the sky and landed on the tip of Jimmu's bow. The kite then shot out a beam of light toward the enemy, blinding them and causing them to retreat. In central Yagi, a 'Golden Kite' monument has been erected to commemorate Jimmu's legendary feat.

== Today ==
The Yamato-Yagi Station is a large Kintetsu train station serving Yagi, with express lines to downtown Osaka (40 minutes), Kyoto (1 hour) and Nara city (20 minutes). A large percentage of Yagi's population work in these neighboring cities. Yagi has a considerable foreign population made up of English language teachers and Peruvian factory workers.

Yagi is Kashihara's entertainment district, and is famous for its abundance of pachinko parlours and Izakaya bars.

There are public statues in the area on the theme of Street Fighter, the computer game.
