= Nara Basin =

Major Basin in Kansai, Japan

Coordinates: 34°34′35″N 135°46′59″E

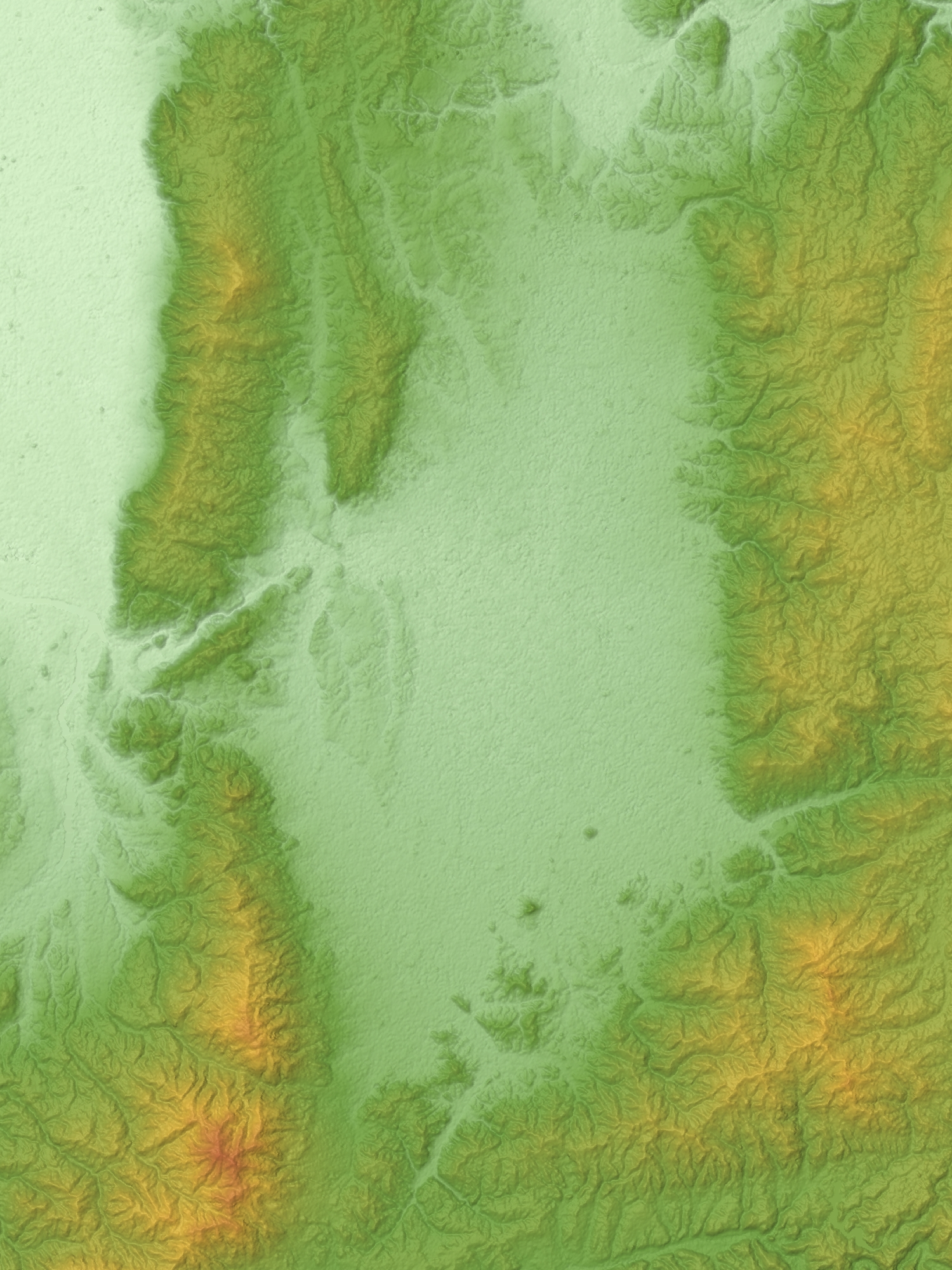
Topographical map of the Nara basin

The Nara Basin (奈良盆地 Nara-bonchi), also known as the Yamato Basin (大和盆地 Yamato-bonchi), is a valley in the north-western part of Nara Prefecture, Japan. It has an area of roughly 300 square kilometres (120 sq mi). It is surrounded on four sides by mountains: the Yamato Plateau in the east, the Ikoma-Kongō range in the west, the Narayama Hills in the north (which separate it from the Kyoto Basin), and the Ryūmon Mountains in the south.

The valley itself makes up only around 8% of the land area of Nara Prefecture, but the terrain is especially fit for rice production, and as the site of the ancient capital of Heijō-kyō it served as a political and cultural centre. Today it is closely connected to the Keihanshin metropolitan area by a strong transport infrastructure, with several major cities growing up in the area in addition to the prefectural capital Nara, and is the most densely populated region of the prefecture.

== Geography ==
The Nara Basin, which is also known as the Yamato Basin, is located in the north-western part of Nara Prefecture, Japan. It is surrounded on four sides by mountains: in the east by the Yamato Plateau (which is raised up by the Kasuga fault scarp); in the west by the Ikoma-Kongō range; in the north by the Narayama Hills, which separate it from the Kyoto Basin; and in the south by the Ryūmon Mountains.

The basin has a total land area of around 300 square kilometres (120 sq mi). This accounts for only about 8% of the land area of the prefecture, but because of its flat and fertile alluvial soil it is especially suited for cultivating rice

== History ==
The imperial capital of Heijō-kyō was constructed here in the eighth century (the Nara period), making this region the political and cultural centre of Japan at the time.

== Population and demographics ==
As of 2000, the population of the Nara Basin was around 1.24 million.

== Settlements ==
The prefectural capital Nara, as well as several important settlements (such as Kashihara, Yamatokōriyama, Tenri, Yamatotakada, Sakurai and Gose), are located in the Nara Basin, making it the most densely populated region of Nara Prefecture.

It is closely connected to the Keihanshin metropolitan area (Kyoto, Osaka and Kobe) by a strong transport infrastructure.

== Works cited ==
- Kikuchi, Ichirō (1994). "Nara-bonchi". Encyclopedia Nipponica (in Japanese). Shogakukan.
- World Encyclopedia (1988). "Nara Bonchi". World Encyclopedia (in Japanese). Heibonsha.
