= Okadera Station =

Railway station in Kashihara, Nara Prefecture, Japan

Okadera Station 岡寺駅
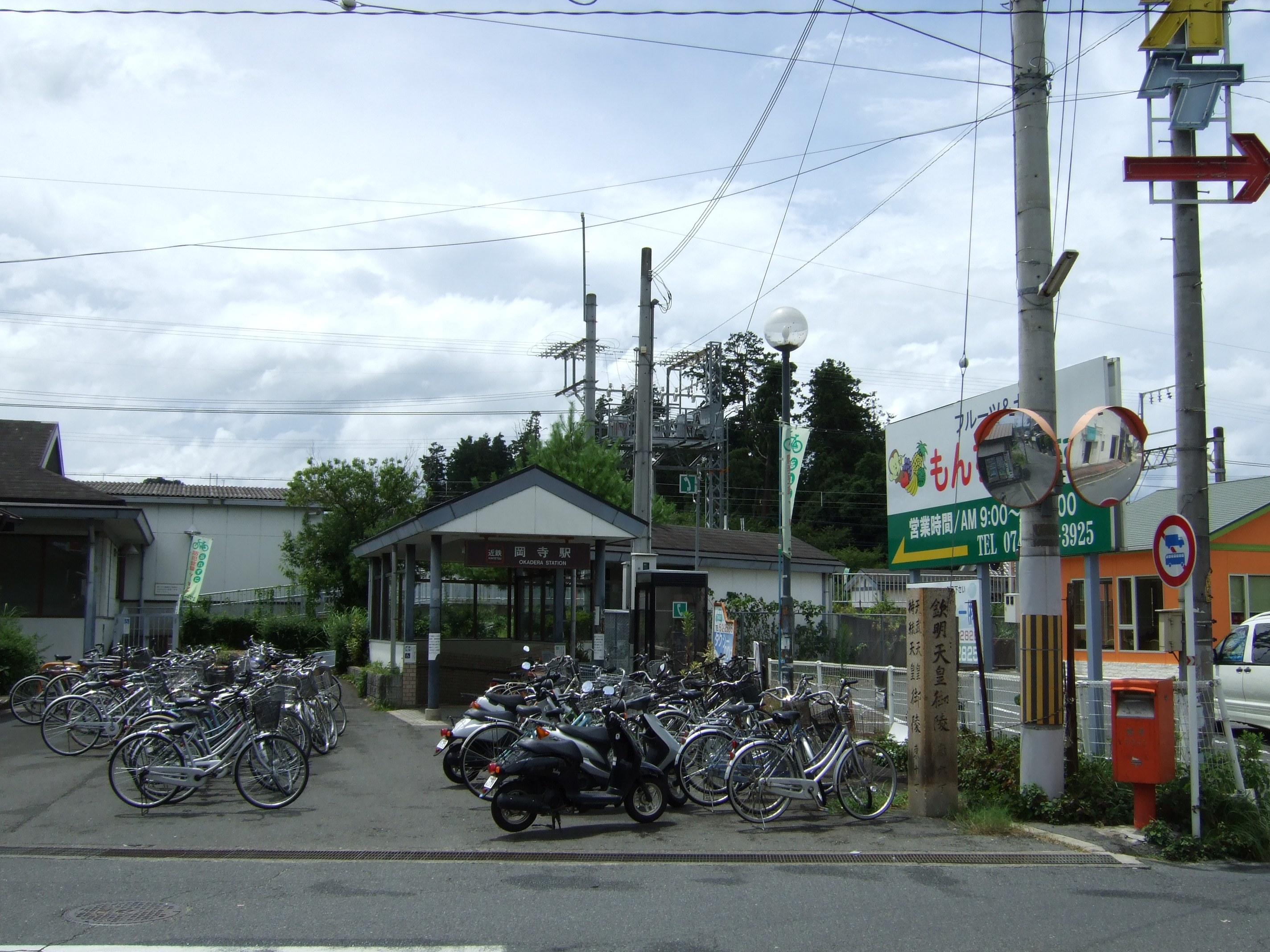
- The entrance of the underground ticket gate

General information
- Location: 590, Mise-chō, Kashihara; Nara （奈良県橿原市見瀬町590） Japan
- Coordinates: 34°28′27″N 135°47′46″E
- System: Kintetsu Railway commuter rail station
- Owner: Kintetsu Railway
- Operator: Kintetsu Railway
- Line: F Yoshino Line
- Distance: 1.1 km (0.68 miles)
- Platforms: 2 side platforms
- Tracks: 2
- Train operators: Kintetsu Railway
- Bus stands: 1
- Connections: Nara Kotsu Bus Lines: 11・12・51・52

Construction
- Structure type: At grade
- Parking: None
- Cycle facilities: Available
- Accessible: Yes (1 accessible slope for the ticket gate and 2 for each platform)

Other information
- Station code: F43
- Website: www.kintetsu.co.jp/station/station_info/en_station08006.html

History
- Opened: 25 January 1923

Passengers
- 2015: 1,435
Services
Preceding station	Kintetsu Railway	Following station
F Yoshino Line
Kashiharajingū-mae towards Ōsaka-Abenobashi or Furuichi	Local	Asuka towards Yoshino, Muda, Yoshinoguchi or Tsubosakayama
Kashiharajingū-mae Terminus	Local	Asuka towards Yoshino, Muda, Yoshinoguchi or Tsubosakayama
Kashiharajingū-mae towards Ōsaka-Abenobashi	Semi-express	Asuka towards Yoshino
Kashiharajingū-mae towards Ōsaka-Abenobashi	Express	Asuka towards Yoshino
Location

Okadera Station (岡寺駅, Okadera-eki) is a railway station located in Kashihara, Nara, Japan.

The station was named after Oka-dera, a Buddhist temple located east of the station. However, the temple recommends visitors use Kashiharajingū-mae Station for bus connections since there is no public transit service from Okadera Station to it.

== Lines ==
- Kintetsu Railway
  - F Yoshino Line

== Surrounding Area ==
- National Route 169

== Platforms and tracks ==
The station has two side platforms and two tracks

1	■ Yoshino Line	for Yoshino
2	■ Yoshino Line	for Kashihara-Jingumae, Furuichi and Osaka Abenobashi
