= List of Hōryū-ji treasures at Tokyo National Museum =

This list is of the treasures of Hōryū-ji at Tokyo National Museum.

== Treasures ==
	Item	Date	Comments	Image	Dimensions	Cat. No.	Ref.
NT	Pictorial Biography of Shōtoku Taishi, colour on figured silk 綾本著色聖徳太子絵伝（絵殿旧障子絵）〈秦致真筆／（法隆寺献納）〉 ryōhon chakushoku Shōtoku Taishi e-den (edono kyū-shōji-e Hata Chitei hitsu Hōryūji kennō)	1069	10 panels; by Hata no Chitei (秦致真) from Settsu Province; from the Tō-in picture hall or Eden (絵殿); shōji remounted as byōbu in the Edo period, and recently remounted again; there is an associated record of conservation work in 1788		189.2 centimetres (74.5 in) to 190.5 centimetres (75.0 in) by 137.2 centimetres (54.0 in) to 148.2 centimetres (58.3 in)	N-1	
ICP	Pictorial Biography of Shōtoku Taishi, colour on silk 絹本著色聖徳太子絵伝（法隆寺献納） kenpon chakushoku Shōtoku Taishi e-den (Hōryūji kennō)	1305	4 panels; by Kōzuke Hokkyō (上野法橋) and Tajima Bō (但馬房)		179.0 centimetres (70.5 in) by 85.7 centimetres (33.7 in); 180.0 centimetres (70.9 in) by 86.8 centimetres (34.2 in); 179.0 centimetres (70.5 in) by 86.6 centimetres (34.1 in); 179.0 centimetres (70.5 in) by 85.7 centimetres (33.7 in)	N-2	
	Buddhist Paintings and Sutras Pasted to Byōbu 仏画写経貼交屏風; Butsuga shakyō harimaze byōbu	Heian to Edo period				N-3	
ICP	King Wen and Lü Shang - Four Sages of Mount Shang, colour on silk 絹本著色文王呂尚・商山四皓図〈／二曲屏風〉 kenpon chakushoku Bunnō Roshō ・Shōzan shikō zu (nikyoku byōbu)	Nanboku-chō period	six two-panel screens; from the west, north, and east walls of the Shariden (舎利殿); shōji remounted as byōbu in the Edo period		147.7 centimetres (58.1 in) by 231.5 centimetres (91.1 in)	N-4	
NT	Record of the Imperial Bequest to Hōryū-ji 法隆寺献物帳（天平勝宝八歳七月八日） Hōryūji kenmotsuchō	8 July 756	after Emperor Shōmu died in 756, his wife Empress Kōmyō donated many of his possession to eighteen major temples, including Tōdai-ji, where they were stored at the Shōsō-in; the record of the donation to Hōryū-ji was originally mounted as a scroll; brushwork by Fujiwara no Nakamaro, Fujiwara no Nagate, Koma Fukushin, Kamo Tsunotari and Kazuragi Henushi		27.8 centimetres (10.9 in) by 70.6 centimetres (27.8 in)	N-5	
	Address at Memorial Service for Prince Shōtoku 皇太子御斎会奏文 kōtaishi gosaie sōbun	Kamakura period			30.3 centimetres (11.9 in) by 69.5 centimetres (27.4 in)	N-6	
NT	Lotus Sūtra in Minute Characters 細字法華経（一部七巻） saiji hokekyō (ichibu nanakan)	694	one scroll with thirty-nine pages of hemp fibre paper, each with fifty-six ruled lines, each with thirty-two characters; brushwork by Li Yuanhui (李元恵); the scroll has a jasper-inlaid axis and a hollowed-out sandalwood case; said to have belonged to Shōtoku Taishi		15.7 centimetres (6.2 in) by 2,150 centimetres (850 in)	N-7	
ICP	Sanskrit Heart Sūtra and Uṣṇīṣa Vijaya Dhāraṇī Sūtra, on palm leaves 梵本心経并尊勝陀羅尼（貝葉） bonpon shingyō narabini sonshō darani (baiyō)	C7/8	two squared palmyra palm leaves, with holes for binding with string		4.9 centimetres (1.9 in) by 28.0 centimetres (11.0 in) and 4.9 centimetres (1.9 in) by 27.9 centimetres (11.0 in)	N-8	
ICP	Bamboo Sūtra Wrappers 竹帙 take chitsu	1190s	two wrappers with gold brocade edges; according to an inscription on the back, they were donated by Minamoto no Yoritomo in the Kenkyū era and repaired in December 1707		31.7 centimetres (12.5 in) by 42.0 centimetres (16.5 in)	N-9	
	Shōsan Jōdo Butsu Shōju Kyō Sūtra 称讃浄土仏摂受経 shōsan jōdo butsu shōju-kyō	Nara period			26.8 centimetres (10.6 in) by 536 centimetres (211 in)	N-10	
	Sūtra of the Wise and Foolish (Great Shōmu) 賢愚経断簡〈大聖武〉 gengu-kyō dankan (ōjōmu)	Nara period	brushwork by Emperor Shōmu		27.0 centimetres (10.6 in) by 10.5 centimetres (4.1 in)	N-11	
ICP	Lotus Sūtra 法華経 hoke-kyō	C8/9	8 scrolls; on yellow hemp paper		scroll 1: 28.0 centimetres (11.0 in) by 1,138.0 centimetres (448.0 in)	N-12	
ICP	Brahmajala Sūtra, gold ink on deep blue paper 紺紙金字梵網経〈上下／〉 konshi kinji bonmō-kyō (jōge)	C9	2 scrolls; according to a note on the inner case this copy was donated by Keishōin (桂昌院), mother of Tokugawa Tsunayoshi			N-13	
	Buddha's Names Sūtra 仏名経; Butusumyō-kyō	1141				N-14	
ICP	Śrīmālādevī Siṃhanāda Sūtra 勝鬘経; Shōman-gyō	C13	1 scroll		30.3 centimetres (11.9 in) by 1,185 centimetres (467 in)	N-15	
	Waka Kaishi 和歌懐紙 waka kaishi	C18	by Empress Go-Sakuramachi		30.3 centimetres (11.9 in) by 43.3 centimetres (17.0 in)	N-16	
	Old Documents 古文書 komonjo	Muromachi period				N-17	
ICP	Private Recollections of the Life of Shōtoku Taishi, by Kenshin 聖徳太子伝私記（古今目録抄）〈顕真筆／〉 Shōtoku Taishi-den shiki (kokon mokurokushō Kenshin hitsu)	early C13	2 folding books; also known as Excerpts from Records of Past and Present		14.0 centimetres (5.5 in) by 14.5 centimetres (5.7 in)	N-18	
	Copy of Excerpts from Records of Past and Present 古今目録抄写 kokon mokurokushō sha	C16	3 scrolls; Muromachi-period version, with different ordering and lengths of episodes		26.2 centimetres (10.3 in) by 791 centimetres (311 in), 821 centimetres (323 in), 625 centimetres (246 in)	N-19	
	Rōei Yōshū 朗詠要集; Rōei Yōshū	1292	musical notation		27.1 centimetres (10.7 in) by 1,009 centimetres (397 in)	N-20	
	Records of the Bettō 別当記 bettō-ki	C14/16			28.3 centimetres (11.1 in) by 20.0 centimetres (7.9 in)	N-21	
	Records of the Kagen Era 嘉元記; Kagen-ki	C14	record of events at Hōryū-ji between 1305 and 1364		27.9 centimetres (11.0 in) by 20.3 centimetres (8.0 in)	N-22	
	Temple Diary 寺要日記 terayō nikki	1449			28.6 centimetres (11.3 in) by 22.4 centimetres (8.8 in)	N-23	
	Large Buddhist Ritual Banner 広東大幡 kanton ōhata	Asuka period			1,214.5 centimetres (478.1 in) by 55.0 centimetres (21.7 in)	N-24	
	Plaque hung above a Gate 不明門勅額 fumyōmon chokugaku	Nara period			106.0 centimetres (41.7 in) by 86.5 centimetres (34.1 in) by 3.5 centimetres (1.4 in)	N-57	
NT	Box with Aloeswood Marquetry 沈香木画箱〈／（法隆寺献納）〉 jinkō mokuga no hako (Hōryūji kennō)	Nara period			19.7 centimetres (7.8 in) by 37.6 centimetres (14.8 in)	N-71	
ICP	Yue Ware, Four-Eared Celadon Jar 越州窯青磁四耳壺; Esshū-yō seiji shijiko	early Tang dynasty				N-121	
	Giboshi 擬宝珠 giboshi	1605			height of 35.5 centimetres (14.0 in), diameter of 20.3 centimetres (8.0 in)	N-130	
ICP	Hōryū-ji Treasure N-143 銅造如来及両脇侍立像（法隆寺献納） Dōzō Nyorai jí Ryō Waki Jiritsu Zō (Hōryūji Ken'nō)	Three Kingdoms of Korea	dates to 5th-6th centuries, bronze is likely sourced from North Chungcheong Province, South Korea		central figure: 28.1 cm left attendant: 20.9 cm right attendant: 20.6 cm	N-143	
ICP	Bronze Amida Nyorai with Two Attendants 銅造阿弥陀如来及両脇侍像（法隆寺献納） dōzō Amida Nyorai oyobi ryōwakiji zō (Hōryūji kennō)	Asuka period	the back of the pedestal is inscribed "Yamada Hall images" (山田殿像), understood to be a reference to Yamada-dera		central figure: 28.4 centimetres (11.2 in)	N-144	
ICP	Bronze Mandorlas 銅造光背（法隆寺献納） dōzō kōhai	594	33 mandorlas		10.8 centimetres (4.3 in) to 34.8 centimetres (13.7 in) by 9.3 centimetres (3.7 in) to 19.8 centimetres (7.8 in)	N-195	
ICP	Bronze Mandorla 銅造光背（法隆寺献納） dōzō kōhai	594	the inscription on the back includes "wood tiger" (甲寅年)		31.0 centimetres (12.2 in) by 17.8 centimetres (7.0 in)	N-196	
	Mandorla 光背 kōhai	C7			33.5 centimetres (13.2 in) by 22.8 centimetres (9.0 in)	N-197	
NT	Gilt Bronze Censer, with a magpie tail-shaped handle 金銅柄香炉〈鵲尾形／（法隆寺献納）〉 hondō egōro (kasasagi ogata Hōryūji kennō)	C7	the underside of the rim is inscribed Jōgū (上宮) and that of the handle Eji (慧慈), Shōtoku Taishi's tutor		39 centimetres (15 in) by 10.2 centimetres (4.0 in)	N-280	
	Flower Stand 花台 kadai	C18/19			59.4 centimetres (23.4 in) by 39.5 centimetres (15.6 in) by 12.2 centimetres (4.8 in)	N-294	
	Banner Fragments 幡残欠 hata zanketsu				95.0 centimetres (37.4 in) by 28.0 centimetres (11.0 in)	N-314	
	Ritual Banner Fragments 広東幡残欠 kanton hata zanketsu	Asuka period			150.5 centimetres (59.3 in)	N-315	
	Twill-Weave Banner Fragments 綾幡残欠 aya hata zanketsu	Asuka to Nara period				N-316	
	Brocade Banner Fragment 錦綾幡残欠 kinryō hata zanketsu	Nara period				N-317	
	Ritual Banner Fragments with a Twill-Weave Top 広東幡残欠（綾幡頭） kanton hata zanketsu (aya bantō)				54.0 centimetres (21.3 in) by 4.5 centimetres (1.8 in)	N-318	
	Banner Fragments 幡残欠 hata zanketsu	Nara period				N-319	

== See also ==
- Cultural property (Japan)
- National Treasures of Japan
