= Hōryū-ji Treasure N-143 =

Baekje style Buddhist sculpture from Horyu-ji

Tathāgata (Nyorai) and two attendants - Hōryū-ji Treasure N-143
- 銅造如来及両脇侍立像（法隆寺献納） Dōzō Nyorai jí Ryō Waki Jiritsu Zō (Hōryūji Ken'nō)
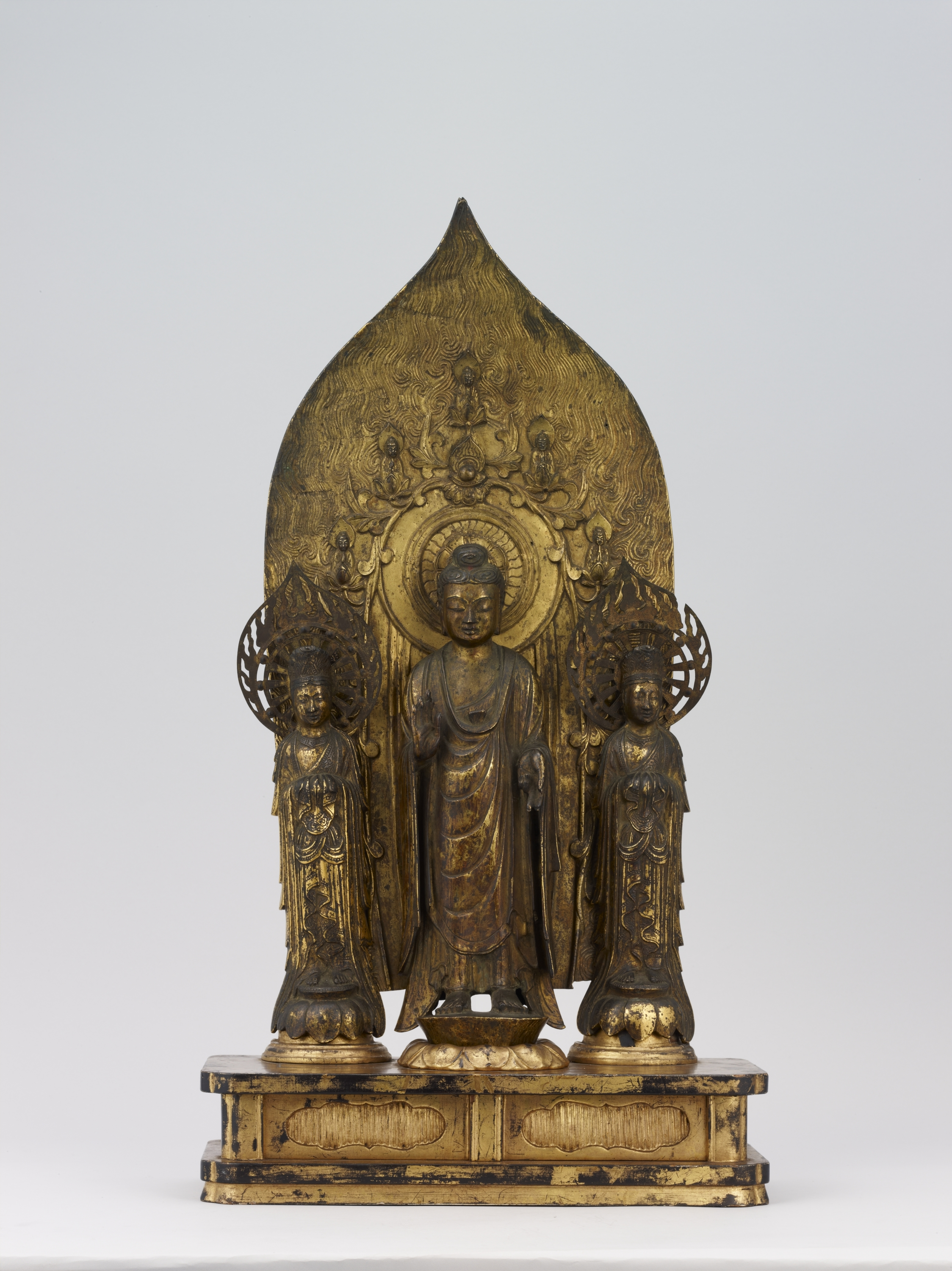
- Type: Buddhist sculpture
- Material: Bronze, Gilding
- Height: Center: 28.1 cm (11.1 in) Left: 20.9 cm (8.2 in) Right: 20.6 cm (8.1 in)
- Created: Baekje Korea
- Present location: Tokyo National Museum
- Classification: Important Cultural Property
- Registration: N-143; 03178
- Culture: Baekje Korea, Asuka period

Hōryū-ji Treasure N-143, also known as Buddha with Two Attendants, is a Baekje/Asuka period sculpture dating to approximately the 6th-7th century that once was held by the temple of Hōryū-ji in Ikaruga, Nara. It is currently held at the Tokyo National Museum as part of the Hōryū-ji Treasures Gallery, and is designated an Important Cultural Property. As part of the cultural exchange between the Three Kingdoms of Korea and Japan, it is considered to be one of the first surviving statues to be imported during the introduction of Buddhism in Japan.

== History ==
Around either the years 538 or 552, the Nihon Shoki recorded the first arrival of Buddhism in Japan through King Seong of Baekje, through a diplomatic visit with Emperor Kinmei. It was decades later in 607, that Prince Shōtoku, who was heavily invested in propagating Buddhism in Japan that he established the monastery of Hōryū-ji, through which during the Hakuhō period, Japanese art took on the characteristics of various Chinese and Three Kingdoms.

Alongside N-143, the Kudara Kannon, the Guze Kannon, the Kōryū-ji Miroku, and the sculptures of Tori Busshi, are seen as major examples of Korean imported, or Korean styles adopted in the Asuka period.

During the Meiji era, the Imperial Household acquired a set of 319 artifacts from Hōryū-ji, where it was subsequently transferred to the Tokyo National Museum in 1949, receiving its current designation as N-143. Alongside the Yamada-den Amida Triad, N-143 is part of a set of Hōryū-ji sculptures known as the Forty-Eight Buddhas. The sculpture received recognition as an Important Cultural Property on 29 May 1965, gaining the designation number 03178.

== Description ==
N-143 depicts a Buddhist trinity with the Tathāgata measuring 28.1 cm, and the left and right bodhisattvas as 28.1 cm and 20.6 cm respectively, cast in bronze and gold plated. In typical Asuka fashion, a lotus-shaped halo is behind all three of these figures.

The Buddha wears a sougishi, a robe under the kesa (typical for Asuka style), with a daie (a formal outer robe covering the shoulders).

Finer facial features such as that of the Buddha's eyebrows, his plump rounded face, vines decorating the halo, and air pockets in the metal lines up with the sculpture not being domestically made in Japan but rather in Baekje Korea. The style also lines up with many of the Tori Busshi statues which have an emphasis on softer features.

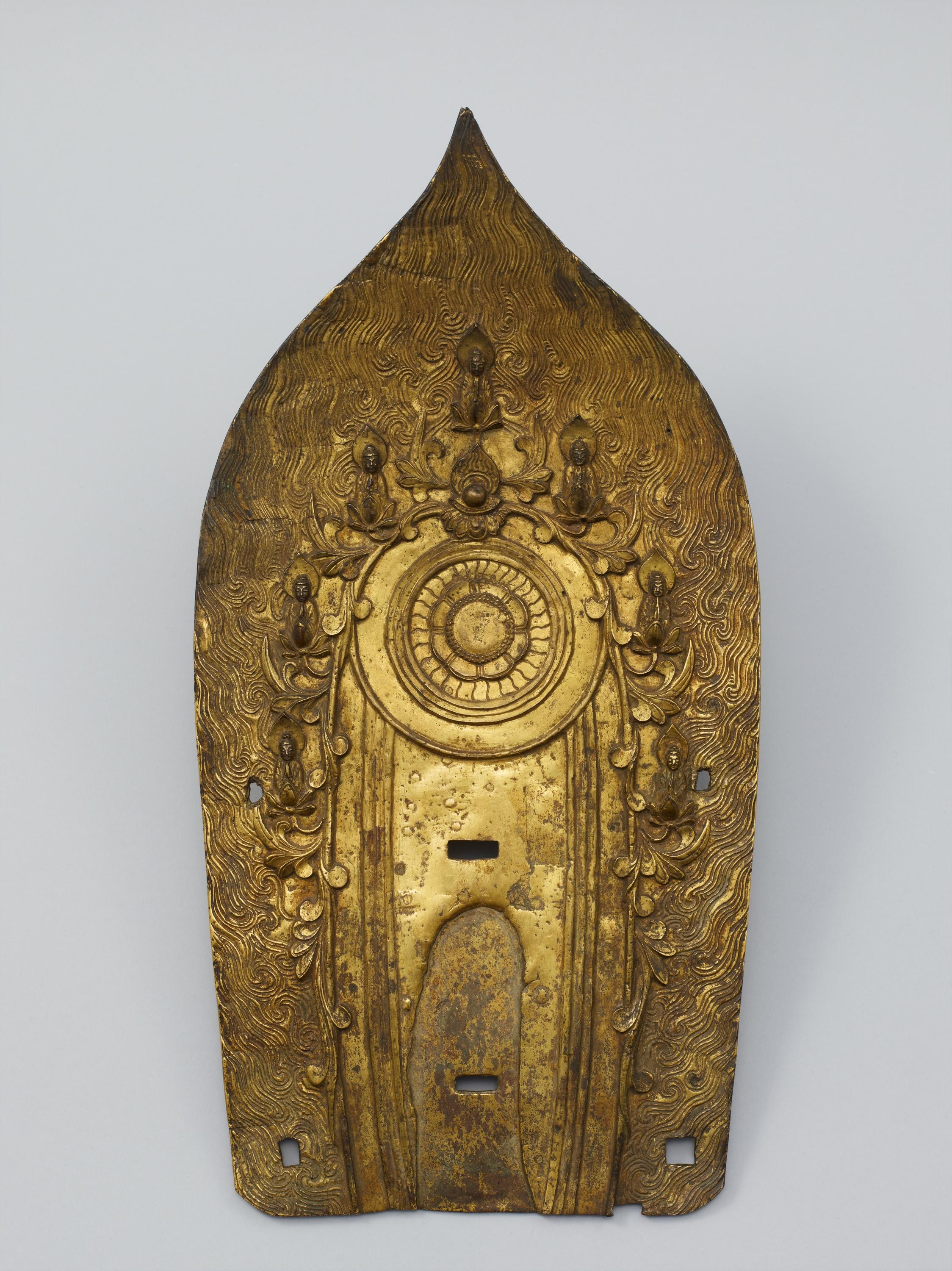
Rear portion of the halo; air pockets and porousness of the metal, and additional metal inlays indicates a lot of reworking required to get the final result.

Metallurgical analysis of N-143 based upon the isotope ratio of lead narrows the origin of the bronze to North Chungcheong Province in present day South Korea, lining up with the statue's Baekje origins.

The statue is made of separate components, with each figure cast separately, before getting assembled as the triad. The Buddha is hollowed from the shoulders, and is assembled from two parts (frontal and rear), while the bodhisattvas are primarily just frontal components, rendered in relief style, modelled from a curved plaque. A total of seven nail projections are present, presumably used to secure the molds used in the casting. The large halo was poorly cast and has many secondary corrections in the form of inlays.

The gold plating remains well preserved on the Buddha and the large halo, and lingering evidence of polychromy has been ascertained, in the form of ultramarine in the eyebrows and eyes and black ink for the irises and the hair of the bodhisattvas. The halos of the attendants are made of worked copper plates. The pedestal, composing of gilded wood and lacquer was made during the Edo period.
