= Yamada-den Amida Triad =

7th century Japanese Buddhist sculpture

Amitabha Tathāgata (Amida Nyorai) and Two Attendants (Donated to Hōryūji)
- 銅造阿弥陀如来及両脇侍像（法隆寺献納） Dōzō Amida Nyorai oyobi ryōwakiji zō (Hōryūji kennō)
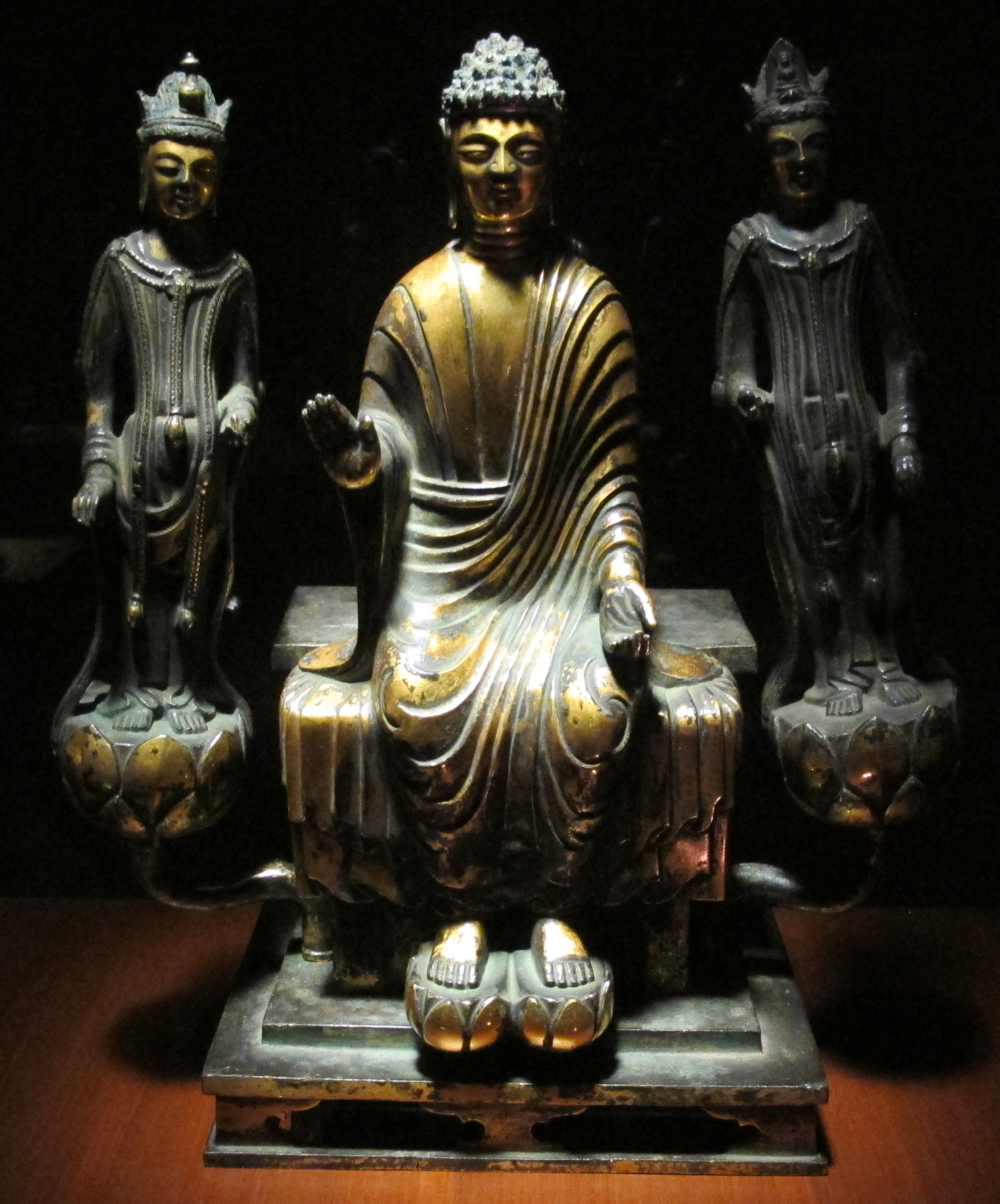
- Type: Buddhist sculpture
- Material: Gilt Bronze sculpture
- Size: (central statue) 28.4 cm (left attendant) 21.1 cm (right attendant) 21.3 cm
- Created: Hōryū-ji, 7th century
- Present location: Tokyo National Museum
- Registration: Hōryūji Treasure N144

The Yamada-den Amida Triad, or Hōryūji Treasure N-144, is a 7th-century sculpture from the Asuka period depicting the Amida Triad, represented by the Buddha Amitābha, accompanied by the Bodhisattvas Kannon and Seishi (Mahasthamaprapta). Once a part of Hōryū-ji, it is currently owned by the Tokyo National Museum as part of the Hōryū-ji Treasure Gallery. It is designated an Important Cultural Property. It is the oldest depiction of the Amida Triad in Japanese art.

== History ==
Hōryū-ji was first established by Prince Shōtoku in the year 607, presenting an emergence and establishment of Japanese Buddhism. Subsequently in the Asuka period, the Hakuhō period presented the rapid expansion of Buddhist thought and aesthetics, with strong influence from the Northern Wei, Sui, and Tang dynasties.

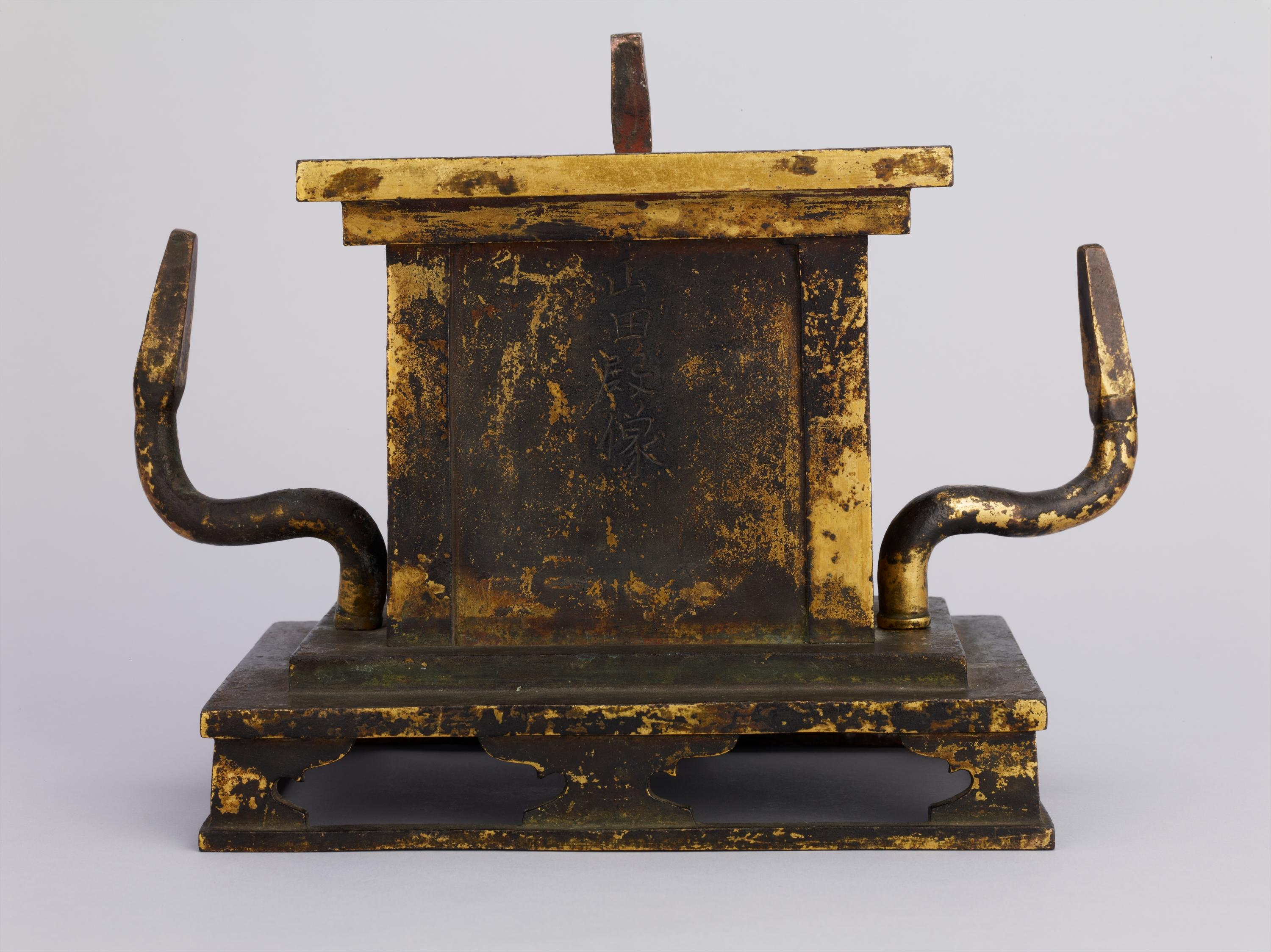
The reverse of the statue base, with the inscription: 山田殿像 (Yamada-dono-zō)

The reverse of the statue base reveals a description attesting to a possible origin: Yamada-den-no-zō (山田殿像), or "Yamada Hall Statue", with Yamada (山田), likely referring to Yamada-dera (山田寺), founded by Soga no Kurayamada no Ishikawa no Maro. Whether the statue was an image at Yamada-dera before its transfer to Hōryū-ji remains uncertain.

During the Meiji era in 1878, the Imperial Household acquired 319 artifacts from Hōryū-ji via donation, including the Amida Triad, whereupon it was transferred to the Tokyo National Museum collection in 1949, receiving its designation as N-144.

On 29 May 1965, it received the designation of Important Cultural Property by the Agency for Cultural Affairs under Catalogue No. 03177.

The transfer from Hōryū-ji presented the initiation and expansion of scholarship of Asuka art, of which as of 2024, 151 statues from the era have been identified so far.

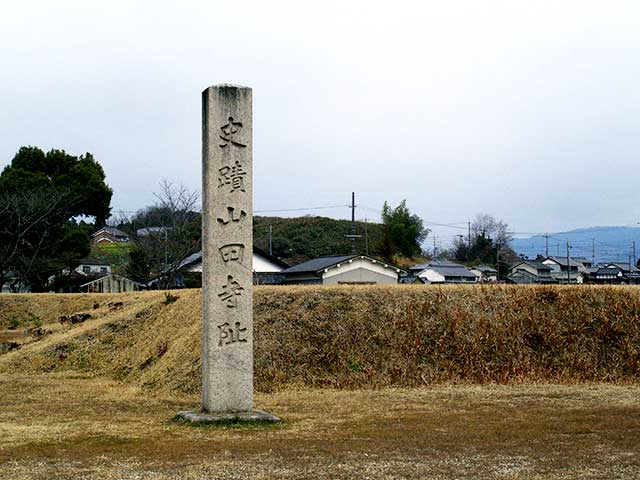
Yamada-dera, where the statue presumably came from based upon its pedestal text.

== Description ==
The Yamada-den Triad consists of detachable parts consisting of gilded bronze. The Amida Triad has been identified based upon the corresponding bodhisattvas, the water-jug in the crown of the left bodhisattva denotes it as Seishi, and the right bodhisattva is identified as Kannon based upon the Buddha in their crown, therefore identifying the central Buddha as Amitābha.

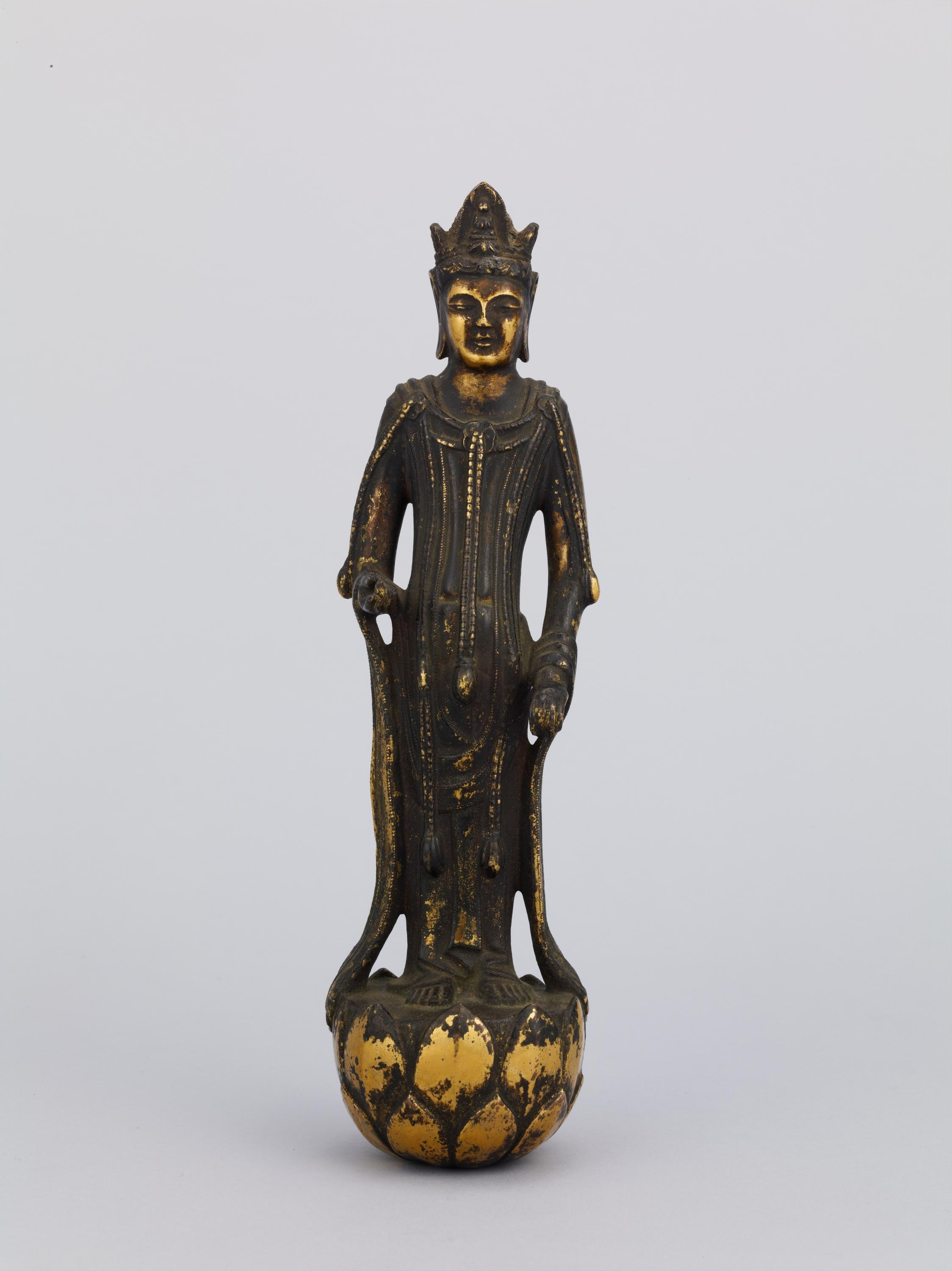
Kannon component of the Triad

The bodhisattvas are depicted with tapered chest, hip flare, and plank-like lower body, with naturalized proportions, presenting a later stage of Asuka art, categorized as a Group III sculpture (Group I denoting the simplicity and archaic style of Northern Wei and Eastern Wei art, Group II denoting Northern Qi conventions, and Group III denoting more naturalistic pose from Group II). Northern Qi and Sui convention is followed with the bodhisattvas' style of crown and jewelry, indicating Japan's quick adaptation to the trends of the time in China.

Amida is seen distinct from the body conventions, his body fully robed, chest puffed out, though the folds of the robes denote positioning of his otherwise covered limbs.

== See also ==
- Hōryū-ji Treasure N-143
