= Hyechong =

Japanese name
- Kanji: 慧灌 or 惠聰
- Hiragana: えそう
Transcriptions
- Revised Hepburn: Esō

Korean name
- Hangul: 혜총
- Hanja: 慧灌 or 惠聰
Transcriptions
- Revised Romanization: Hyechong
- McCune–Reischauer: Hyech'ong

Hyechong also known as Esō was a Buddhist monk from Baekje who travelled to Japan in the Asuka period to transmit Buddhism.

Traveling to Japan in 595 (the 3rd year of Empress Suiko), he preached Buddhism. When Hōkō-ji (法興寺, Hōkō temple), which is now Ango-in (安居院) or Asuka-dera (飛鳥寺, Asuka temple) was completed in 596, the monk lived with the priest Eji from Goguryeo, and together they were called "Sanpō no Tōryō" (三宝の棟梁, "The leaders of three treasures").
