= Yamada-dera =

Buddhist temple in Nara Prefecture, Japan

- 山田寺
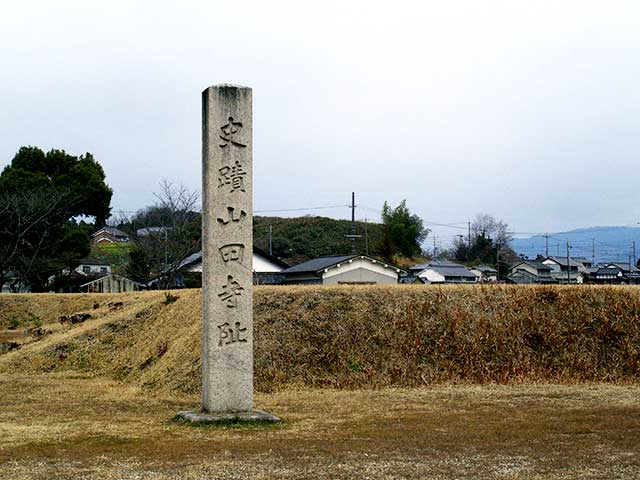
- Yamada-dera ruins

- Location within Nara Prefecture Location within Japan

Religion
- Affiliation: Buddhist
- Deity: Jūichimen-Kannon
- Rite: Hossō-shū

Location
- Location: Sakurai, Nara
- Country: Japan
- Interactive map of Yamada-dera
- Coordinates: 34°29′2″N 135°49′48″E

Architecture
- Completed: late 7th century
- Special National Historic Site

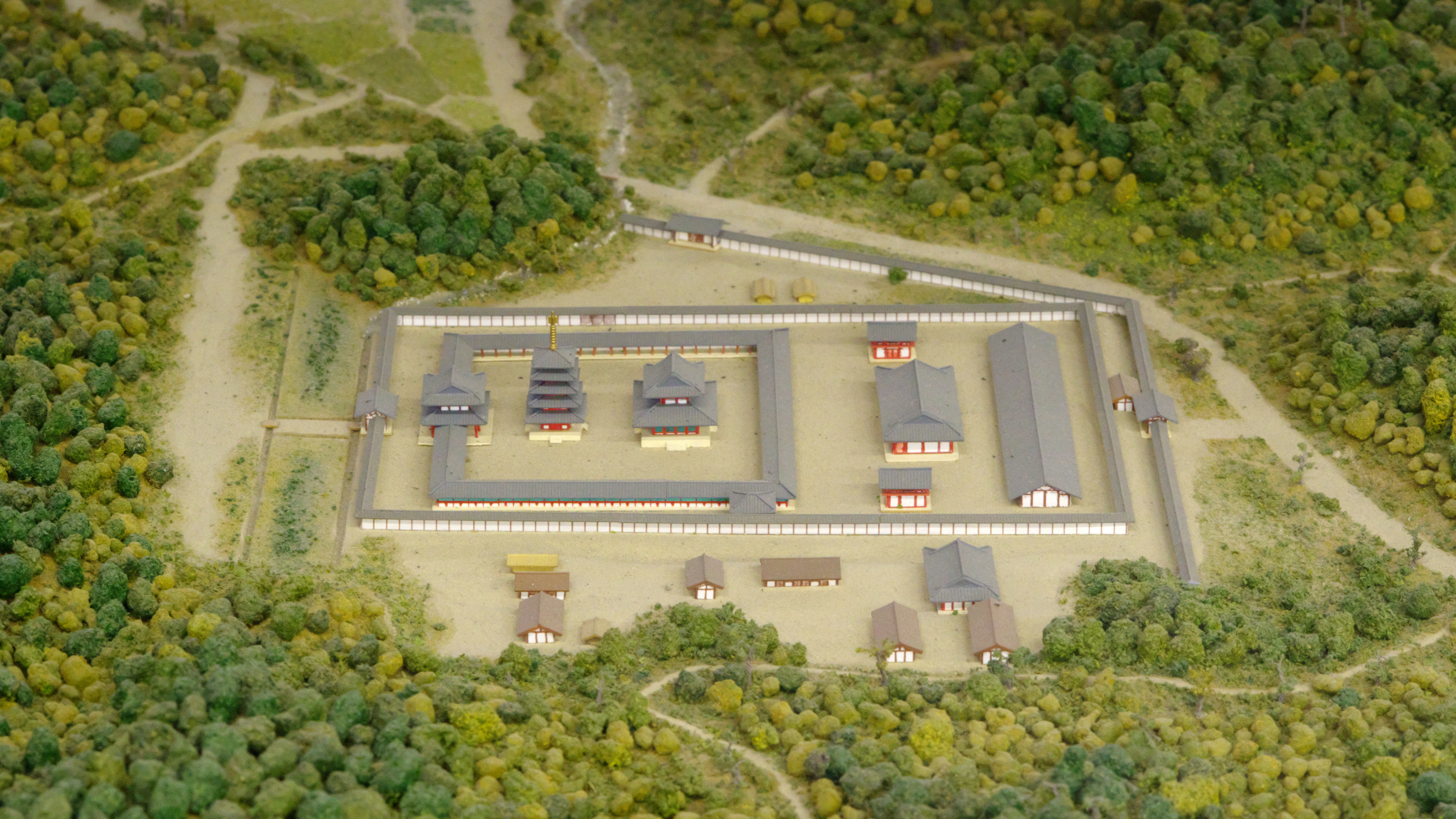
Model of Yamada-dera Temple at the time of its construction. A part of the 1/1000 model of Fujiwara-kyo in the Kashihara-shi Fujiwara-kyo reference room.

Yamada-dera (山田寺) was a Buddhist temple established in the Asuka period in Sakurai, Nara Prefecture, Japan. The area was designated a National Historic Site in 1921, with its status elevated to a Special National Historic Site in 1952. It also forms part of a grouping of sites submitted in 2007 for future inscription on the UNESCO World Heritage List: Asuka-Fujiwara: Archaeological sites of Japan’s Ancient Capitals and Related Properties. Excavations in the 1980s uncovered a well-preserved section of the temple's covered corridors that predate the surviving buildings of Hōryū-ji: "for the history of Japanese architecture, this discovery is of as great moment as the finding of the seventh-century Takamatsuzuka tomb paintings in March 1972 was for the history of Japanese art."

== History ==
Yamada-dera was established as a private temple by Soga no Kurayamada no Ishikawa no Maro. After drainage of the site, work began on the Kondō and surrounding corridors in 641. Although a member of the Soga clan, he was hostile to the main branch of the clan led by Soga no Emishi and Soga no Iruka. He conspired with Nakatomi no Kamatari and Prince Naka-no-Ōe in the Isshi incident of 645. However, four years later in 649, per the Nihon Shoki, Soga no Hyuga, Ishikawa no maro's half-brother, informed Prince Naka-no-Ōe that Ishikawa no Maro was plotting rebellion. When confronted, Ishikawa no Maro did not resist, but instead committed suicide in front of the Kondō of Yamada-dera along with his family.

The Jōgū Shōtoku Hōō Teisetsu, a biography of Shōtoku Taishi, documents renewed construction at the site from 663 with the erection of a pagoda, after Prince Naka-no-Ōe, who had married one of Ishikawa no Maro's daughters, had ascended the throne as Emperor Tenchi; this building was completed by 676. The uragaki or notes to Jōgū Shōtoku Hōō Teisetsu mention the eye-opening ceremony of a sixteen-foot Buddha in the temple's Lecture Hall in 685. The Nihon Shoki records a visit by Emperor Temmu a few months later to the temple of Jōdo-ji, identified by Aston as Asuka-dera but now thought to refer to Yamada-dera. In the following decade, Emperor Mommu granted lands to support the temple.

=== Subsequent developments ===
Records of the temple in the Heian period are scarce, but it is known that Fujiwara no Michinaga visited Yamada-dera in 1023 and expressed admiration for the according to the Fusō ryakuki (扶桑略記). However, by the end of the following century, the Kondō and pagoda had burned, and, according to the Tōnomine ryakki (多武峰略記), the temple had become a branch of Tōnomine-dera (today's Tanzan Jinja).

In 1187, warrior-monks from Kōfuku-ji attacked Yamada-dera, and stole the honzon of the Lecture Hall, a Yakushi Nyōrai triad, and made it the principal image of the East Kondō of Kōfuku-ji. Excavations have confirmed that the Kondō, pagoda, and lecture hall were burned down at the end of the 12th century, and it is believed that they were burned down during this incident. At that time, Kofuku-ji was in the process of being rebuilt after having been burned down by Taira no Shigehira during the Genpei War of 1180. The Yakushi Nyōrai statue stolen from Yamada-dera was destroyed in a fire in the East Kondō in 1411, and only the head survived, which was placed inside the base of the newly constructed principal image. The existence of this Buddha head was unknown until it was rediscovered in 1937. The two attendant statues, Nikkō Bosatsu and Gakkō Bosatsu, which were also stolen, are still in good condition in the East Kondō of Kōfuku-ji, and are designated as Important Cultural Properties, whereas the Yakushi Nyorai head is designated a National Treasure. After this incident, Yamada-dera seems to have fallen into disrepair.

=== Later history ===
Kamakura period documents indicate that the temple was involved in a land dispute in 1279, confirming that the temple still existed during this period. Excavations have unearthed roof tiles from the Kamakura to Muromachi periods, indicating that the temple was rebuilt on the site of the lecture hall. As a tile with name "Kōfuku-ji" written on it has been excavated, it is believed to have been a branch temple of Kōfuku-ji. In the grounds of the current Yamada-dera are a number of stone monuments bearing inscriptions from the Edo period. Yamada-dera was completely abandoned at the start of the Meiji era due to the Meiji government's anti-Buddhist Haibutsu kishaku policy. It was reconstructed in 1892 as a small Kannon-dō and priest's quarters on top of the ruins of the Lecture Hall.

The current temple belongs to the Hossō-shū and its honzon is a statue of Jūichimen-Kannon thought to have been made in the late Muromachi period. Many of the foundation stones of the original temple were looted for use in gardens, and one is located at the Fujita Art Museum in Osaka. In 1975, the government purchased the site and developed it into a historic park in 2001.

== Architecture ==
Excavations of the site by the Nara Research Institute for Cultural Properties from 1976 have revealed the plan of the complex. The main temple buildings were arranged along a central north-south axis, with the gate opening through the covered corridors and leading to the pagoda, standing in front of the Kondō; thus far the plan was the same as at Shitennō-ji, but unlike that temple, the kōdō or lecture hall was outside this inner precinct, behind the rear arcade.

The pillars of the 3x3 bay gate were sunk directly into the ground, rather than their being supported on base stones; similar sunken pillars may be found at Ise Jingū. The central pillar of the 3x3 bay pagoda rested on a base stone a metre below the podium on which it stood, as in the later examples at Hōryū-ji and Hōrin-ji. The base stones, uniquely carved with lotus petals, of the kondō reveal a 3x2 bay central core or moya and unusually narrow side bays. The base stones of the 8x4 bay lecture hall include holes bored for swing doors. The precinct itself extended 22 bays east to west, some eighty-four metres between the outer walls.

In the 1982 phase, at a depth of 2.2 meters, a large number of tiles were discovered from the site of the east corridor, including circular eave-end tiles of the "Yamada-dera type", deeply moulded, with eight double lotus petals and a ring of six seeds around the centre. Beneath, a 1.7 bay section of the wooden outer wall was uncovered, including base stones with lotus designs; columns, with marked entasis; base and head penetrating tie-beams; middle non-penetrating tie-beams; latticed windows; sections of lath for plastering; and bracket blocks. Additional elements discovered the following year include bracket arms, rainbow beams, rafters, and purlins. Traces of red paint on the timbers and fragments of plaster were also uncovered. Further discoveries in 1984 included better-preserved windows and ground plates and pivot blocks for doors.

The pillars are of camphor, other than one of cypress, perhaps a historic repair; the other elements are largely of cypress, although one zelkova tie-beam again seems to be evidence of a historic repair; and some of the wall laths are of pine.

== Statuary ==
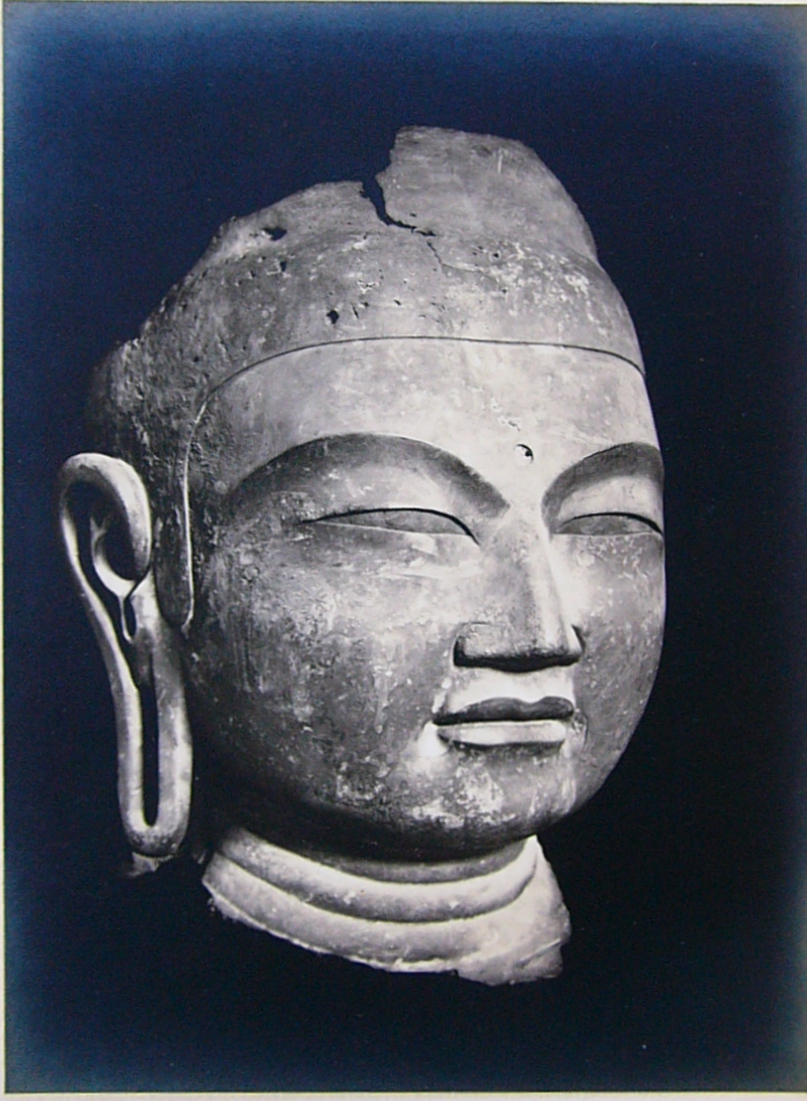
Bronze Buddha head from Yamada-dera (NT); 98.3 centimetres (3 ft 2.7 in); dedicated in 685; now at Kōfuku-ji

A bronze Buddha head, tentatively identified as that of Yakushi, is the sole surviving element of the principal triad of the former Kōdō or lecture hall. The statue group was cast between 678 and 685. Appropriated by monks from Kōfuku-ji in the 1180s, it was moved to Nara and re-enshrined in Kōfuku-ji's East Kondō. Only the head survived destruction in the fire caused by a lightning strike in 1411. Subsequently deposited under the altar platform, it was rediscovered in 1937 and is now a National Treasure on view in the Kōfukuji National Treasure Museum. The work marks a watershed in the periodization of Japanese Buddhist sculpture. It is a "document of stylistic transition, embodying the naiveté of Suiko faith, yet already swelling with the maturity of Tempyō".

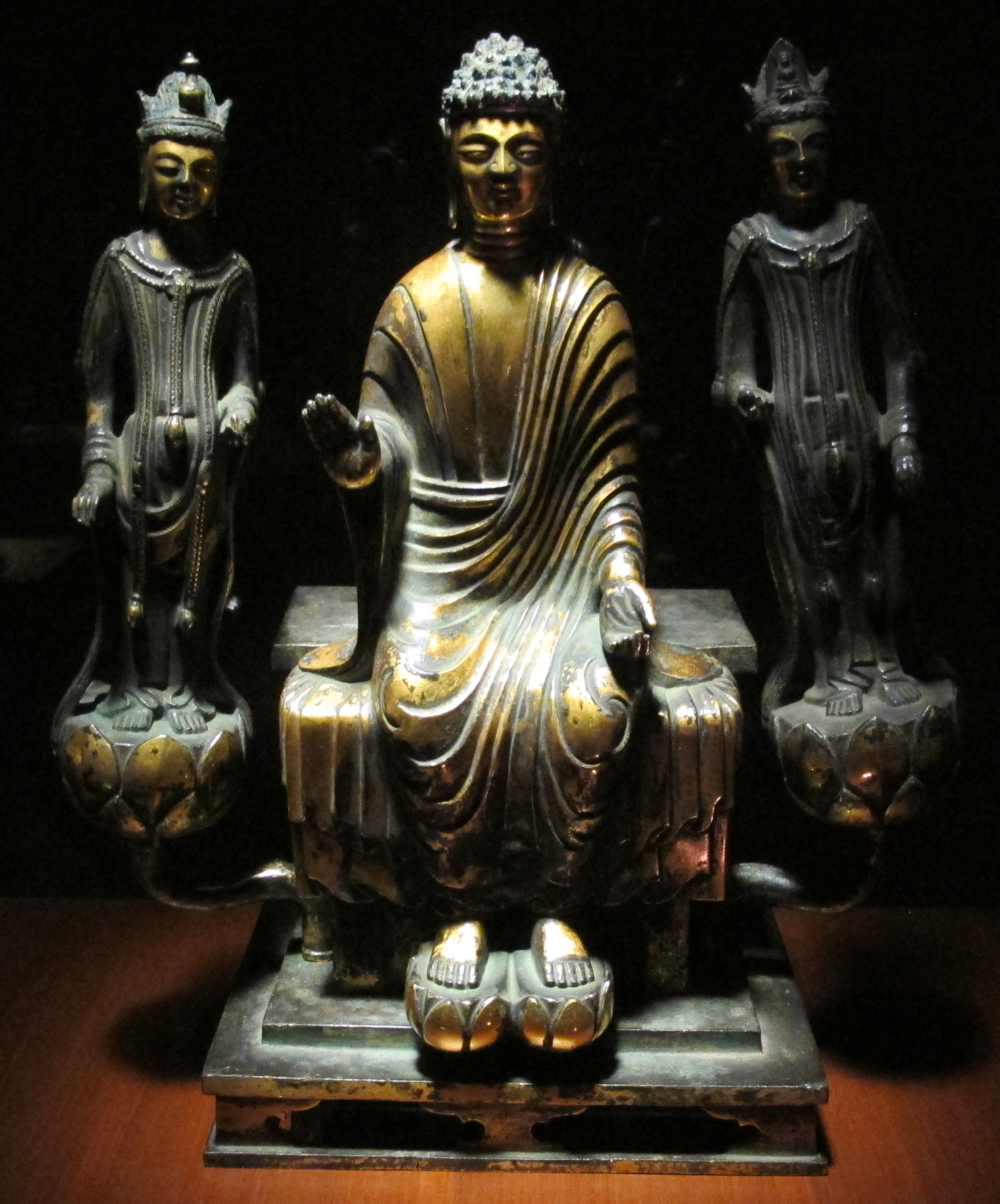
Yamada-den Amida Triad, designated as Hōryūji Treasure N-144 (ICP)

A statue depicting the Amida Triad with its base inscription 山田殿像 (Yamada-den-no-zō), originally from Hōryū-ji, has been attributed to have connections to Yamada-dera, though its true history remains uncertain. Currently at the Tokyo National Museum, it is designated an Important Cultural Property.

== Conservation ==
To avoid anisotropic shrinkage and cell collapse during the drying of the waterlogged wood recovered, the architectural members were treated with polyethylene glycol (PEG), a synthetic fiber polymer used gradually to replace the water content before permanent hardening. This treatment methodology was introduced in the late 60s and early 70s in Denmark to conserve the Skuldelev ships and in Sweden for the Vasa.

In Japan, it was used first on wooden tablets from Gangō-ji and then in 1972 on parts from the Kodera dam site in Matsuyama. Although this treatment is irreversible and leads to visual darkening, consolidation with PEG also makes the wood inedible thus helping prevent biodeterioration; since Japanese Buddhist architecture makes use of joinery rather than metal pins, the incompatibility of PEG with associated metal components was not a concern; PEG is the most common choice of consolidant for such applications, and has since been used on the Bremen cog and Mary Rose. Since PEG has an affinity with water, it is necessary to maintain artefacts treated in this way in a stable low-humidity environment. Designated an Important Cultural Property, the excavated artefacts are now stored and displayed at the Asuka Historical Museum.

== See also ==
- Asuka-Fujiwara
- List of National Treasures of Japan (sculptures)
- List of Special Places of Scenic Beauty, Special Historic Sites and Special Natural Monuments
- List of Important Cultural Properties of Japan (Asuka period: structures)
- Conservation Techniques for Cultural Properties
- Japanese Buddhist architecture
