= Hyeja =

Japanese name
- Kanji: 慧慈 or 恵慈
- Hiragana: えじ
Transcriptions
- Revised Hepburn: Eji

Korean name
- Hangul: 혜자
- Hanja: 慧慈 or 恵慈
Transcriptions
- Revised Romanization: Hyeja
- McCune–Reischauer: Hyeja

Hyeja (Japanese: Eji (慧慈 or 恵慈, year-of-birth unknown - February 22nd by the lunar calendar, March 31st by the solar calendar, 623)) was the first priest who came across the sea from Goguryeo to Japan in the Asuka period, 595. He was a tutor of Buddhism to Shōtoku Taishi.

He propagated Buddhism in Japan. He lived at Hōkō-ji (法興寺 Hōkō temple), currently Ango-in (安居院) or Asuka-dera (飛鳥寺 Asuka temple), with priest Esō who came from Baekje. They were called "Sanpō no Tōryō" (三宝の棟梁 The leader of three treasures).

In 615, he went back to the home country, Goguryeo, with an annotated book of the Buddhist scriptures, which was written by Shōtoku Taishi.

He heard the news that Shōtoku Taishi died on February 22, 622. He grieved very much and took an oath of meeting Shōtoku Taishi again in the Pure Land (浄土 celestial realm) on the same day of next year. He achieved an oath.
