= Soga no Kurayamada no Ishikawa no Maro =

Japanese noble (died 649)

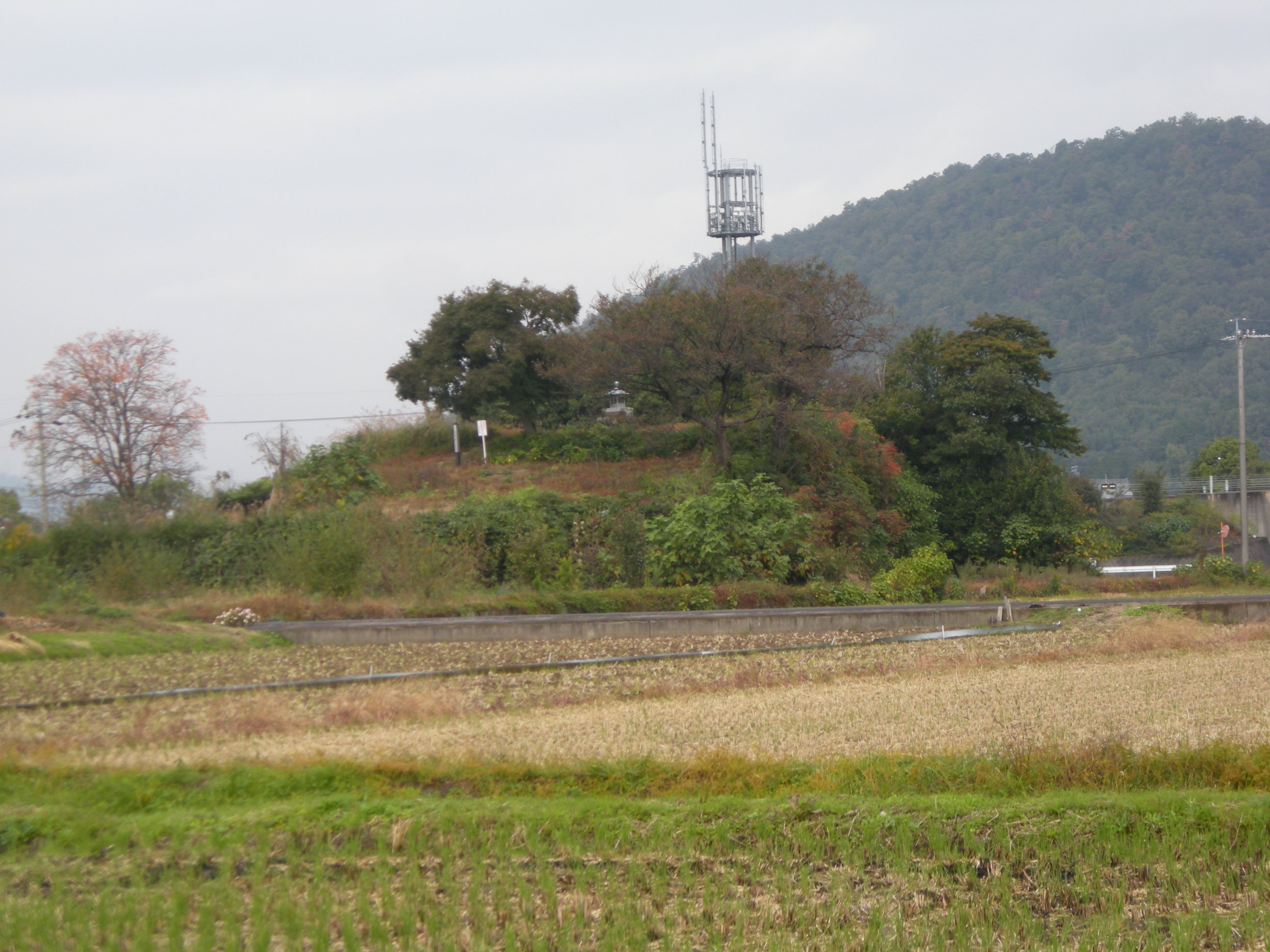
Tomb said to be that of Soga no Kurayamada no Ishikawa no Maro in Kakamigahara, Gifu Prefecture (Municipal Historic Site)

Soga no Kurayamada no Ishikawa no Maro (蘇我倉山田石川麻呂) (died 649) was a member of the Soga clan and first holder of the office of udaijin (Minister of the Right). He was the son of Soga no Kuramaro and grandson of Soga no Umako; his daughter was married to Prince Naka-no-Ōe. After the fall of Soga no Iruka, he was the most senior member of the family. As chronicled in the Nihon Shoki, he was accused of treason and strangled himself at Yamada-dera in 649; his wife and seven of his children also committed suicide; other relatives were captured and executed. The discovery of exonerating documents led to a posthumous pardon and the posting of his slanderer to Tsukushi Province. His death brought the political ascendancy of the Soga clan to an end.
