= Asuka period =

Period of Japanese history, 538–710 CE

- 538–710
| Kofun period | Nara period |
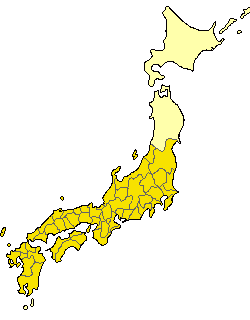
- Location: Japan (Wa (倭), renamed Nippon (日本) in 701)
- Monarchs: Kinmei (539/540–571); Tenmu (673–686); Genmei (707–710)
- Leaders: Soga no Iname (538/552–570); Soga no Emishi (626–645)
- Key events: Introduction of Buddhism; Soga–Mononobe conflict (552–587); Embassy to China (607); Isshi incident (10 July 645); Taika Reform (645); Jinshin War (672); Asuka Kiyomihara Code proclaimed (689); Capital moved from Asuka to Fujiwara-kyō (694); Taihō Code enacted (701–718)

The Asuka period (飛鳥時代, Asuka jidai; Japanese pronunciation: [a.sɯ̥.ka ((d)ʑiꜜ.dai)]) was a period in the history of Japan lasting from 538 to 710, although its beginning could be said to overlap with the preceding Kofun period. The Yamato polity evolved greatly during the Asuka period, which is named after the Asuka region, about 25 km (16 mi) south of the modern city of Nara.

The Asuka period is characterized by significant artistic, social and political transformations, which originated earlier during the late Kofun period. The introduction of Buddhism and the widespread adoption of Chinese writing system to write Japanese marked a cultural change in Japanese societies. The Asuka period is also distinguished by the change in the name of the country from Wa (倭) to Nippon (日本).

== Naming ==
The term "Asuka period" was first used to describe a period in the history of Japanese fine-arts and architecture. It was proposed by fine-arts scholars Sekino Tadasu (関野貞) and Okakura Kakuzō around 1900. Sekino dated the Asuka period as ending with the Taika Reform of 646. Okakura, however, saw it as ending with the transfer of the capital to the Heijō Palace of Nara. Although historians generally use Okakura's dating, many historians of art and architecture prefer Sekino's dating and use the term "Hakuhō period (白鳳時代)" to refer to the successive period.

== Yamato Imperial Court ==
The Asuka period in the 6th century, as a sub-division of the Yamato period (大和時代, Yamato-jidai), is the first time in Japanese history when the Emperor of Japan ruled relatively uncontested from modern-day Nara Prefecture, then known as Yamato Province.

During the second half of the Kofun period, the Yamato court exercised power over clans in Kyūshū and Honshū, bestowing titles, some hereditary, on clan chieftains. The Yamato name became synonymous with all of Japan as the Yamato rulers suppressed other clans and acquired agricultural lands. Based on Chinese models (including the adoption of the Chinese written language), they developed a central administration and an imperial court attended by subordinate clan chieftains but with no permanent capital. By the mid-seventh century, the agricultural lands had grown to a substantial public domain, subject to central policy. The basic administrative unit of the Gokishichidō (五畿七道; "five cities, seven roads") system was the county, and society was organized into occupation groups. Most people were farmers; others were fishers, weavers, potters, artisans, armorers, and ritual specialists.

== Soga clan and Shōtoku Taishi ==
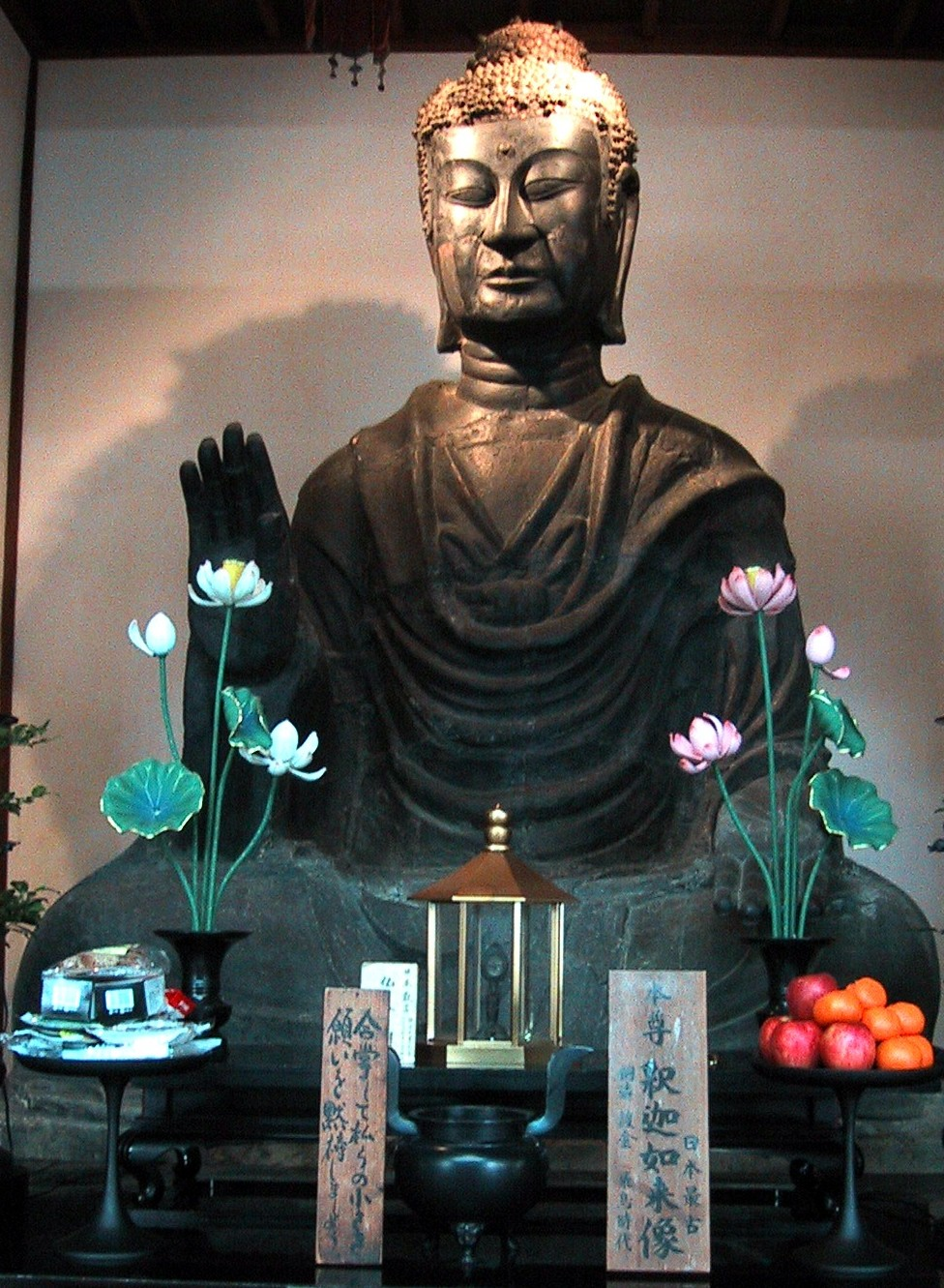
The Daibutsu at the Asuka-dera in Asuka, the oldest known statue of the Buddha in Japan with an exact known date of manufacture, 609 AD; the statue was made by Kuratsukuri-no-Tori, son of a Korean immigrant.

The Soga clan intermarried with the imperial family, and by 587 Soga no Umako, the Soga chieftain, was powerful enough to install his nephew as emperor and later to assassinate him and replace him with the Empress Suiko (r. 593–628). Suiko, the first of eight sovereign empresses, is sometimes considered a mere figurehead for Umako and Prince Regent Shōtoku Taishi (574–622). However she wielded power in her own right, and the role of Shōtoku Taishi is often exaggerated to the point of legend.

Shōtoku, recognized as a great intellectual of this period of reform, was a devout Buddhist and was well-read in Chinese literature. He was influenced by Confucian principles, including the Mandate of Heaven, which suggested that the sovereign ruled at the will of a supreme force. Under Shōtoku's direction, Confucian models of rank and etiquette were adopted, and his Seventeen-article constitution prescribed ways to bring harmony to a chaotic society in Confucian terms.

In addition, Shōtoku adopted the Chinese calendar, developed a system of trade roads (the aforementioned Gokishichidō), built numerous Buddhist temples, had court chronicles compiled, sent students to China to study Buddhism and Confucianism, and sent Ono no Imoko to China as an emissary (遣隋使, Kenzuishi).

Six official missions of envoys, priests, and students were sent to China in the seventh century. Some remained twenty years or more; many of those who returned became prominent reformers. The sending of such scholars to learn Chinese political systems showed significant change from envoys in the Kofun period, in which the five kings of Wa sent envoys for the approval of their domains.

In a move greatly resented by the Chinese, Shōtoku sought equality with the Chinese emperor by sending official correspondence that was addressed, "From the Son of Heaven in the Land of the Rising Sun to the Son of Heaven of the Land of the Setting Sun."

Some would argue that Shōtoku's bold step set a precedent: Japan never again accepted a "subordinate" status in its relations with China, except for Ashikaga Yoshimitsu, who accepted such a relationship with China in the 15th century. As a result, Japan in this period received no title from Chinese dynasties, while they did send tribute (有貢無封, yūkō mufū). From the Chinese point of view, the class or position of Japan was demoted from previous centuries in which the kings received titles. On the other hand, Japan loosened its political relationships with China and consequently established extraordinary cultural and intellectual relationships.

== Taika Reform and the ritsuryō system ==
=== Taika Reform ===
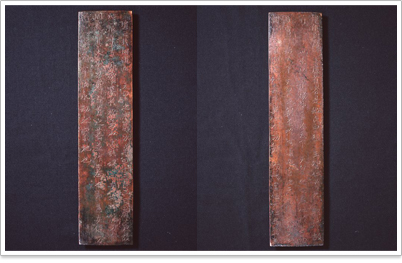
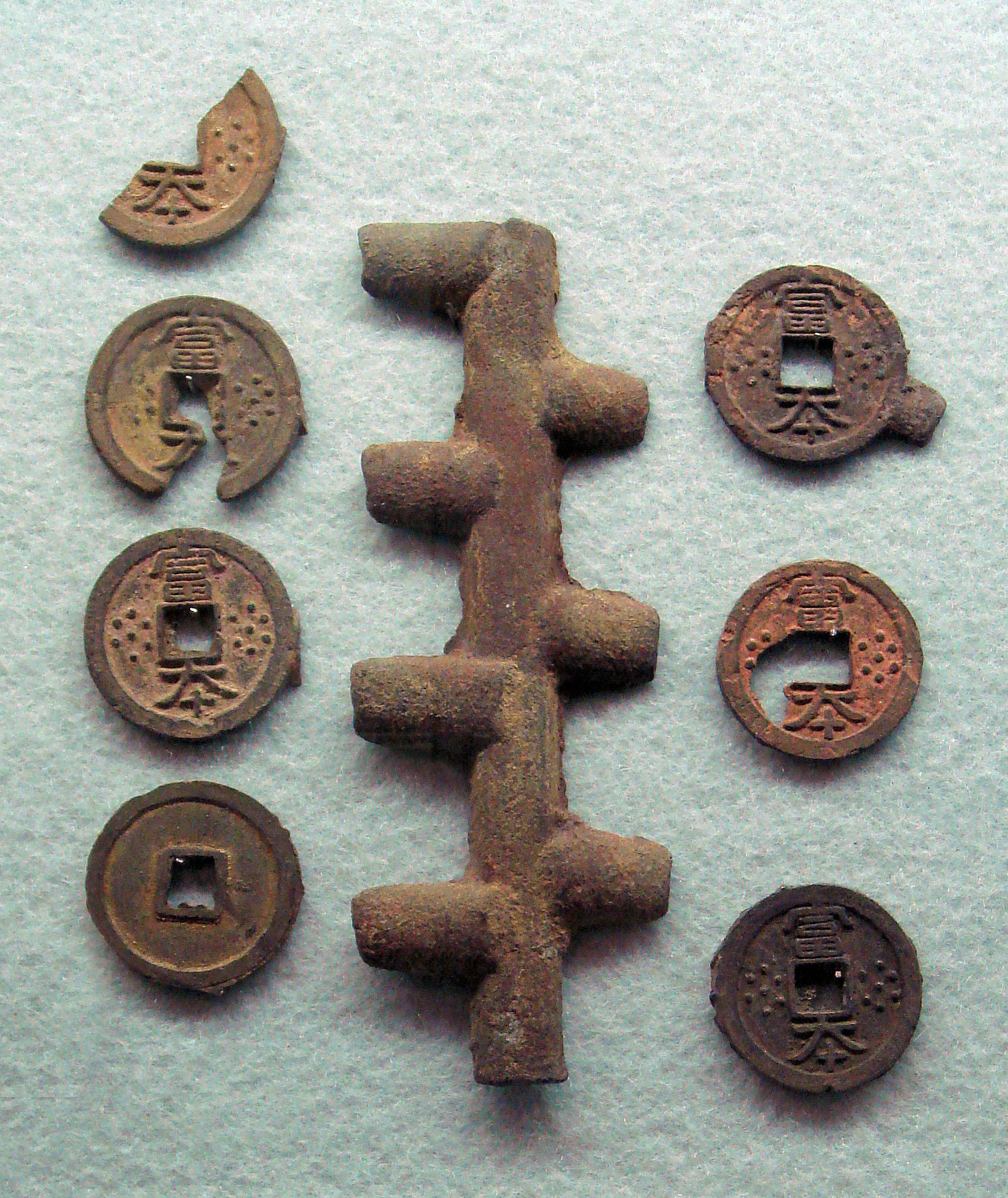
Left image: Copper epitaph of Funashi Ōgo (銅製船氏王後墓誌, dōsei funashi ōgo no boshi), who died in 641 AD and was reburied with his wife in 668 AD. The inscription of 162 characters tells on one side about his birthplace and career and on the opposite about his age at death and the burial details.
Right image: Copper Fuhonsen (富本銭) coinage from the 7th century, Asuka period

About twenty years after the deaths of Shōtoku Taishi (in 622), Soga no Umako (in 626), and Empress Suiko (in 628), court intrigues over succession led to a palace coup in 645 against the Soga clan's monopolized control of the government. The revolt was led by Prince Naka no Ōe and Nakatomi no Kamatari, who seized control of the court from the Soga family and introduced the Taika Reform. The Japanese era corresponding to the years 645–649 was thus named Taika (大化), meaning "great change" in reference to the Reform. The revolt leading to the Taika Reform is commonly called the Isshi Incident, referring to the Chinese zodiac year in which the coup took place, 645.

Although it did not constitute a legal code, the Taika Reform mandated a series of reforms that established the ritsuryō system of social, fiscal, and administrative mechanisms of the seventh to tenth centuries. Ritsu (律) was a code of penal laws, while ryō (令) was an administrative code. Combined, the two terms came to describe a system of patrimonial rule based on an elaborate legal code that emerged from the Taika Reform.

The Taika Reform, influenced by Chinese practices, started with land redistribution aimed at ending the existing landholding system of the great clans and their control over domains and occupational groups. What were once called "private lands and private people" (私地私民, shichi shimin) became "public lands and public people" (公地公民, kōchi kōmin), as the court now sought to assert its control over all of Japan and to make the people direct subjects of the throne. Land was no longer hereditary but reverted to the state at the death of the owner. Taxes were levied on harvests and on silk, cotton, cloth, thread, and other products. A corvée (labor) tax was established for military conscription and building public works. The hereditary titles of clan chieftains were abolished, and three ministries were established to advise the throne:

- the Minister of the Left
- the Minister of the Right
- the Chancellor of the Realm

The country was divided into provinces headed by governors appointed by the court, and the provinces were further divided into districts and villages.

Naka no Ōe assumed the title of Crown Prince, and Kamatari was granted a new family name—Fujiwara—in recognition of his great service to the imperial family. Fujiwara no Kamatari became the first in a long line of court aristocrats. Another, long-lasting change was the use of the name Nihon (日本), or sometimes Dai Nippon (大日本; "Great Japan") in diplomatic documents and chronicles. In 662, following the reigns of Naka no Ōe's uncle and mother, Naka no Ōe assumed the throne as Emperor Tenji, taking the additional title Emperor of Japan. This new title was intended to improve the Yamato clan's image and to emphasize the divine origins of the imperial family in the hope of keeping it above political frays, such as those precipitated by the Soga clan. Within the imperial family, however, power struggles continued as the emperor's brother and son vied for the throne in the Jinshin War. The brother, who later reigned as Emperor Tenmu, consolidated Tenji's reforms and state power in the imperial court.

=== Ritsuryō system ===
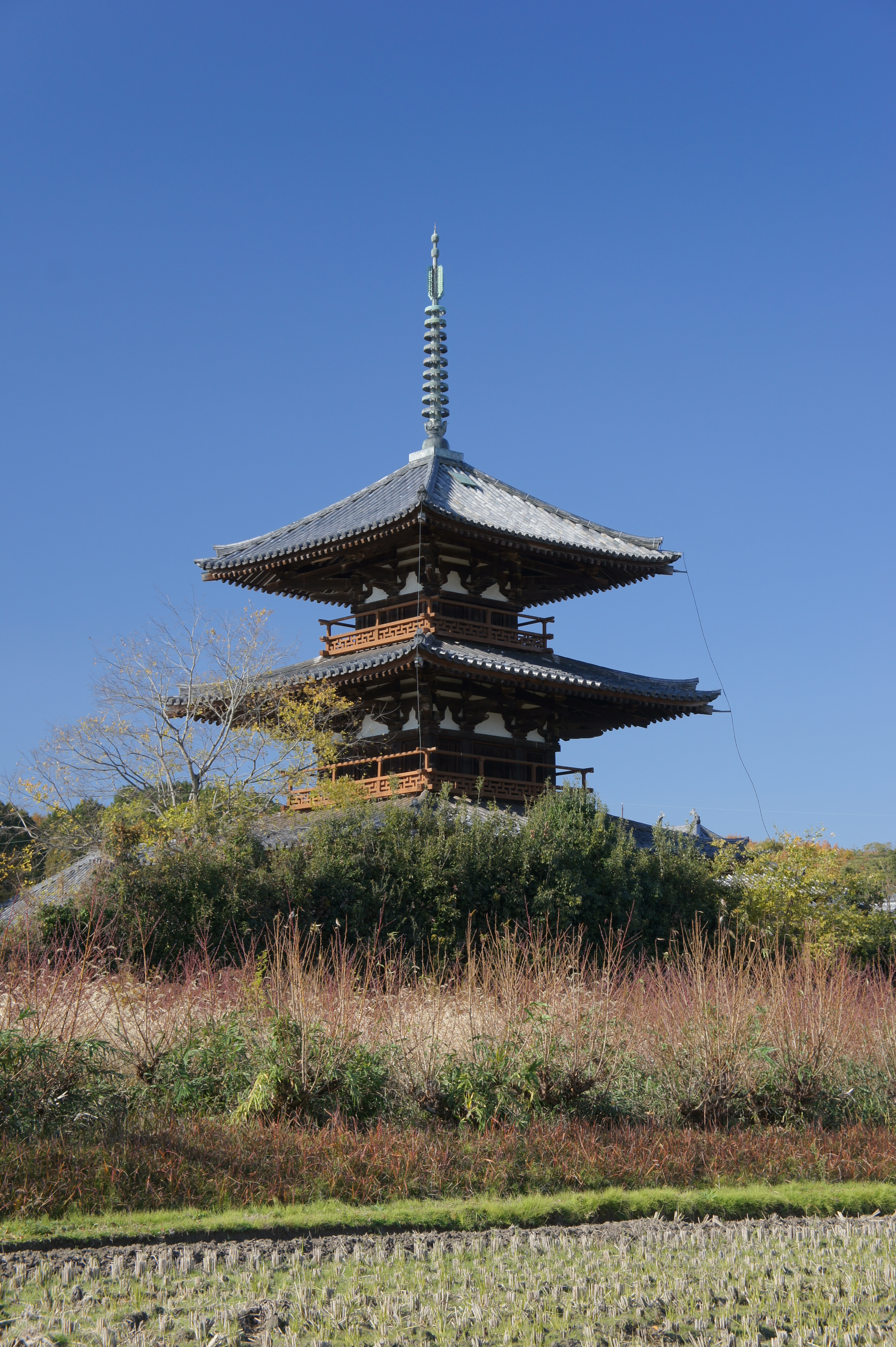
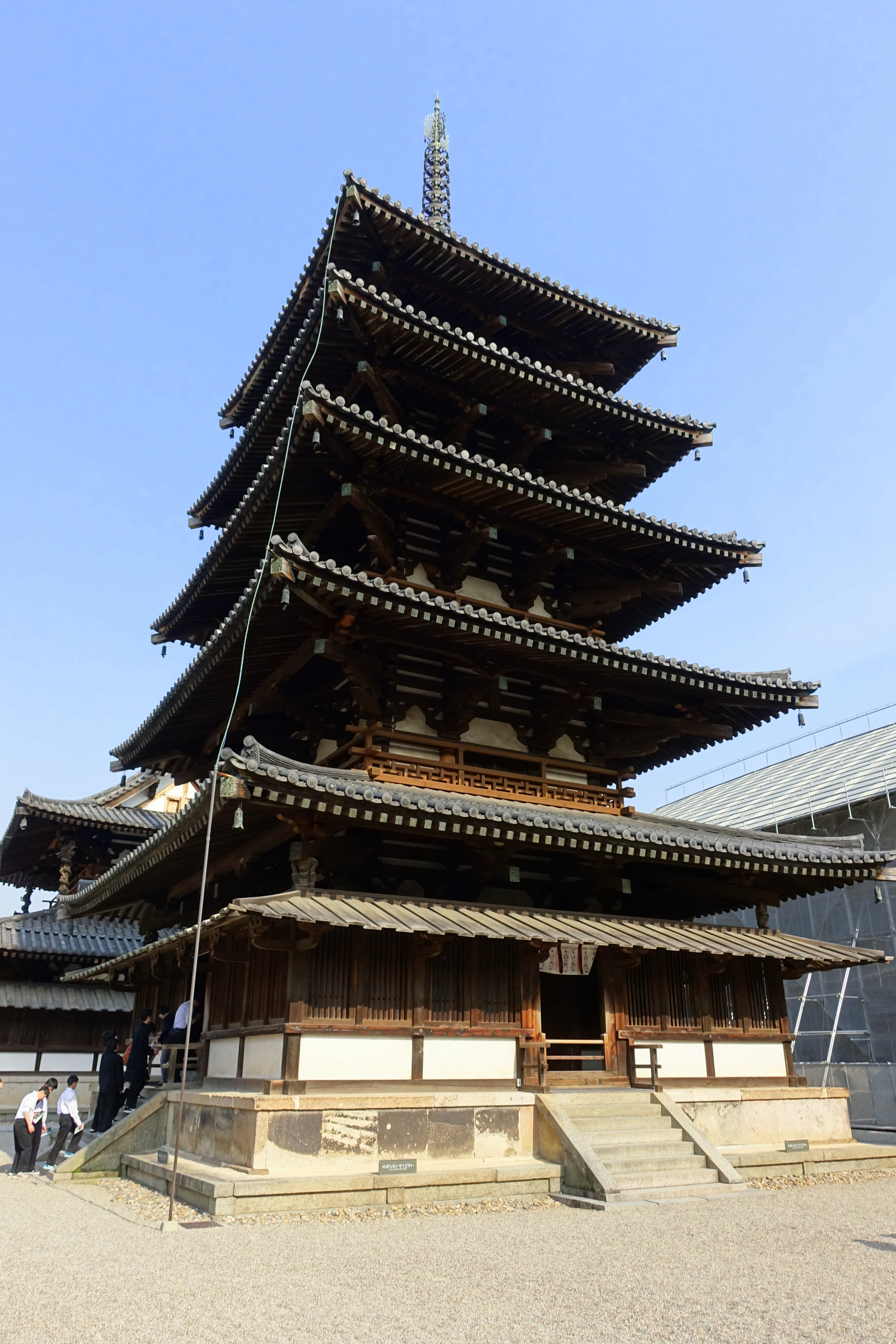
Left image: The three-story pagoda of Hokki-ji temple, built in 706 at the end of the Asuka period
Right image:The five-storied Japanese pagoda of Hōryū-ji temple, built in the early 7th century (temple was founded in 607; carbon dating of the pagoda's wooden components proves that they were felled as far back as 594)

The ritsuryō system was codified in several stages. The Ōmi Code, named after the provincial site of Emperor Tenji's court, was completed in about 668. Further codification took place with the promulgation by Empress Jitō in 689 of the Asuka Kiyomihara Code, named for the location of the late Emperor Temmu's court. The ritsuryō system was further consolidated and codified in 701 under the Taihō Code, which, except for a few modifications and being relegated to primarily ceremonial functions, remained in force until 1868.

Though the ritsu of the code was adopted from the Chinese system, the ryō was arranged in a local style. Some scholars argue that it was to a certain extent based on Chinese models.

The Taihō Code provided for Confucian-model penal provisions (light rather than harsh punishments) and Chinese-style central administration through the Jingi-kan (神祇官), which was devoted to Shinto and court rituals, and the Daijō-kan (太政官), with its eight ministries (for central administration, ceremonies, civil affairs, the imperial household, justice, military affairs, people's affairs, and the treasury). Although the Chinese-style civil service examination system was not adopted, the college office (大学寮, Daigaku Ryō) was founded for training future bureaucrats based on the Confucian classics. Tradition circumvented the system, however, as aristocratic birth continued to be the main qualification for higher position, and titles were soon hereditary again. The Taihō Code did not address the selection of the sovereign. Several empresses reigned from the fifth to the eighth centuries, but after 770 succession was restricted to males, usually from father to son, although sometimes from ruler to brother or uncle.

Fujiwara no Fuhito, son of Nakatomi no Kamatari, was among those who produced the Taihō Ritsuryō. According to history book Shoku Nihongi (続日本紀), two of the 19 members of the committee drafting the Taihō Code were Chinese priests (Shoku Shugen and Satsu Koukaku). Chinese priests also took an active part as linguistic specialists, and received rewards two times from Empress Jitō.

== Foreign relations ==
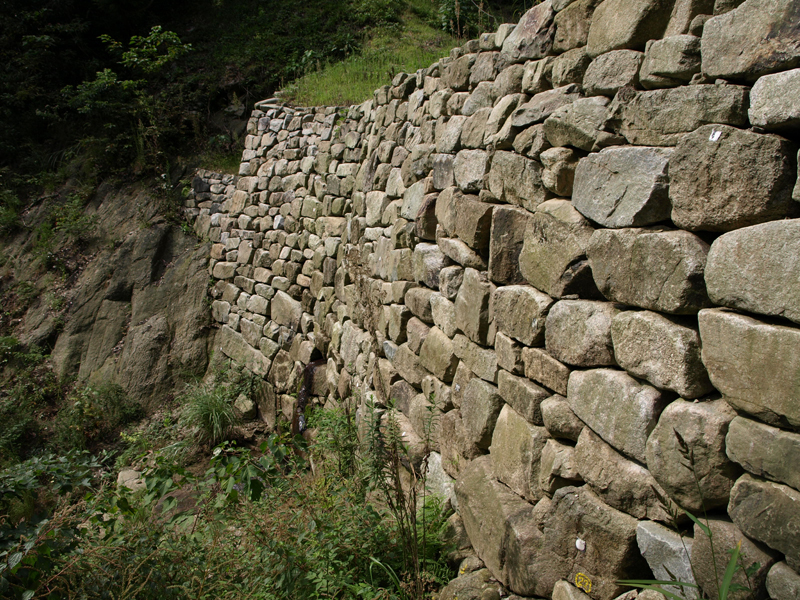
A stone foundation section of the Mount Shioji Ōnojō Castle Ruins, where construction began in 665

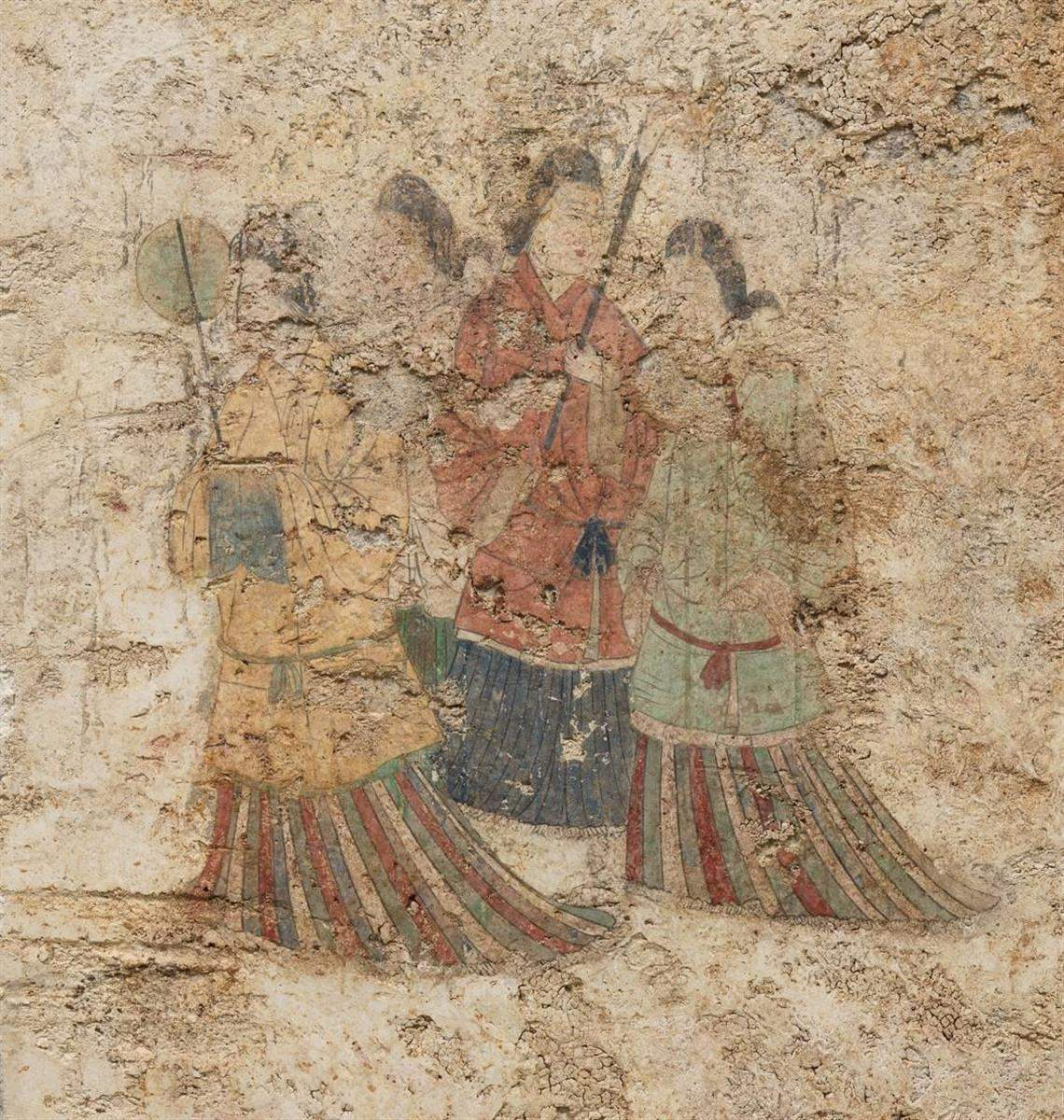
A wall mural depicting ladies, from the west wall of the Takamatsuzuka Tomb, late 7th century, Asuka period

Chinese culture had been introduced to Japan by the Three Kingdoms of Korea before the imperial Japanese embassies to China were established. Although the missions continued, the transformation of Japan through Chinese influences declined, despite the close connections that had existed during the early Kofun period. Meanwhile, the kingdoms of the Korean peninsula, often at odds with each other, frequently sent diplomatic missions with gifts to Japan, probably with the aim of securing Japanese neutrality or diplomatic/military support in their rivalries; ultimately, this proved to be of the greatest benefit to Baekje, as Japanese military support for that kingdom increased. People, many of them artisans and skilled workers, also emigrated to Japan from the Korean peninsula, including two high priests who arrived in Japan in 595: Eji from Goguryeo and Esō from Baekje. Kanroku also came from Baekje, and was a tutor to Prince Shōtoku, counseling him politically. When Japan allied with Baekje, the Goguryeo priests left Japan. The Yamato court, concentrated in the Asuka region, exercised power over clans in Kyushu and Honshu, bestowing titles, some hereditary, on clan chieftains. The Yamato name became synonymous with all of Japan as the Yamato rulers suppressed the clans and acquired agricultural lands. Based on Chinese models (including the adoption of the Chinese written language), they developed a central administration and an imperial court attended by subordinate clan chieftains but with no permanent capital. By the mid-seventh century, the agricultural lands had grown to a substantial public domain, subject to central policy. The basic administrative unit was the county, and society was organized into occupation groups. Most people were farmers; other were fishers, weavers, potters, artisans, armorers, and ritual specialists.

From 600 to 659, Japan sent seven emissaries to Tang China. But for the next 32 years, during a period when Japan was formulating its laws based on Chinese texts, none were sent. Though Japan cut off diplomatic relations with China, Japan sent 11 emissaries to Silla, and Silla is also recorded in Nihon Shoki as sending embassies to Japan 17 times during the reigns of Emperor Tenmu and Empress Jitō. The ruling classes of Yamato and Baekje were on amicable terms, and Yamato deployed its navy to aid Baekje, in 660–663, against an invasion by Silla and Tang China (see battle of Baekgang). The Taika Reform in the mid-7th century was also a measure toward centralization of power and showed some progress. However, the greatest catalyst for centralization came in the latter half of the 7th century, when Japan suffered a crushing defeat at the hands of Chinese Tang dynasty in the Battle of Baekgang. After this defeat, the various factions within Japan reached a consensus, and by advancing the development of the national system, the process of centralization began to accelerate rapidly.

Numerous official missions of envoys, priests, and students were sent to China in the seventh century. Some remained twenty years or more; many of those who returned became prominent reformers. In a move greatly resented by the Chinese, Shotoku sought equality with the Chinese emperor by sending official correspondence addressed "From the Son of Heaven in the Land of the Rising Sun to the Son of Heaven of the Land of the Setting Sun." Shotoku's bold step set a precedent: Japan never again accepted a subordinate status in its relations with China.

== Introduction of Buddhism ==
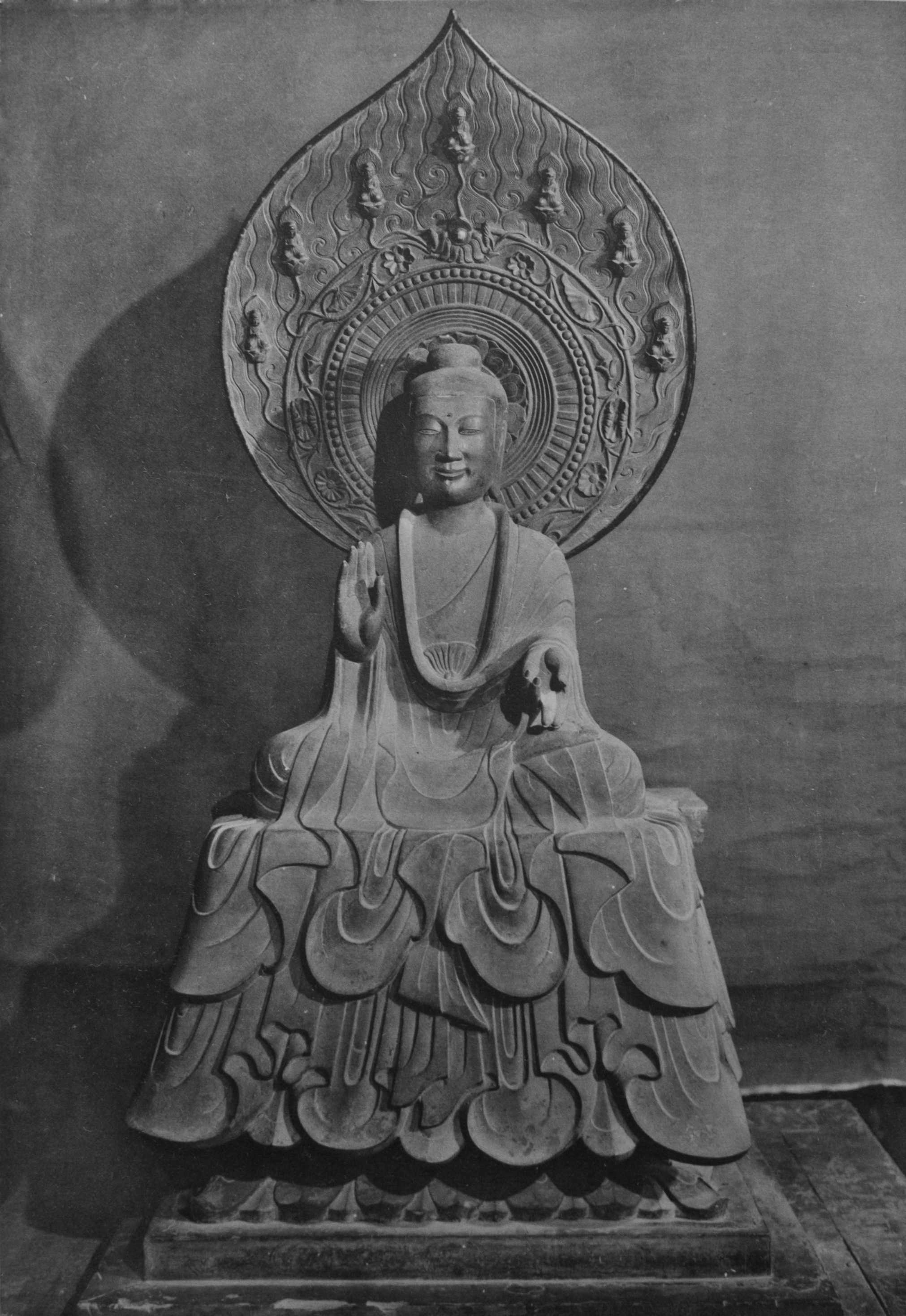
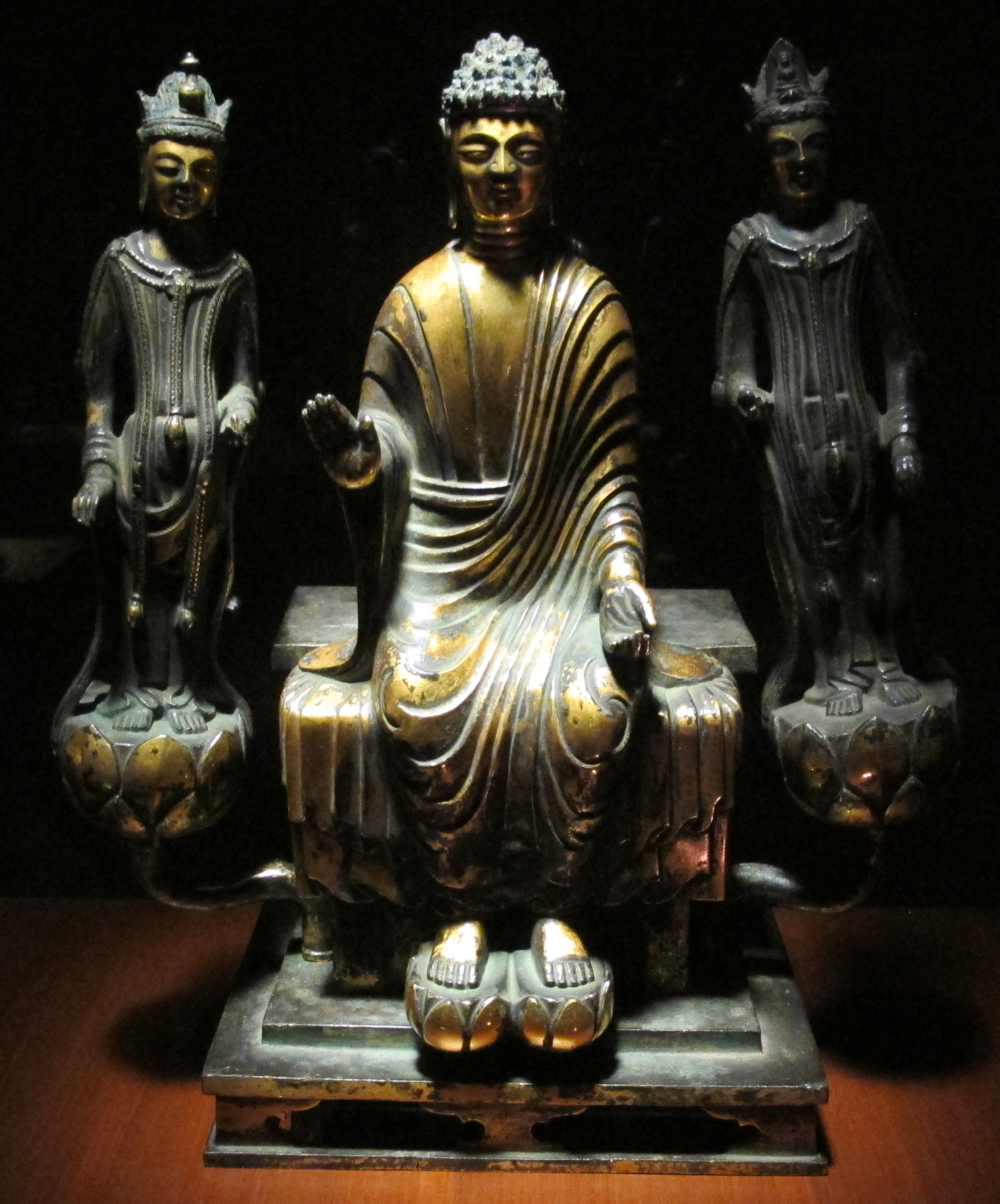
Left image: Yakushi Nyorai (National Treasure), Kondo, Horyuji, Nara Prefecture, Japan, 7th century, Asuka period
Right image: Amitabha Buddha and two assistants, gilded bronze, 7th century

The introduction of Buddhism to Japan is attributed to the Baekje king Seong in 538, exposing Japan to a new body of religious doctrine. The Soga clan, a Japanese court family that rose to prominence with the ascension of the Emperor Kinmei about 531, favored the adoption of Buddhism and of governmental and cultural models based on Chinese Confucianism. But some at the Yamato court—such as the Nakatomi family, which was responsible for performing Shinto rituals at court, and the Mononobe, a military clan—were set on maintaining their prerogatives and resisted the alien religious influence of Buddhism. The Soga introduced Chinese-modeled fiscal policies, established the first national treasury, and considered the kingdoms of Korea as trade partners rather than as objects of territorial expansion. Acrimony continued between the Soga and the Nakatomi and Mononobe clans for more than a century, during which the Soga temporarily emerged ascendant.

In the Taika Reform, the Funeral Simplification Edict was proclaimed, and the building of large kofun (tumuli) was banned. The edict also regulated size and shape of kofun by classes. As a result, later kofun, though much smaller, were distinguished by elaborate frescoes. Paintings and decorations in those kofun indicate the spread of Taoism and Buddhism in this period; the Takamatsuzuka Kofun and Kitora Kofun are notable for their wall paintings.

The use of elaborate kofun tombs by the imperial family and other elite thus fell out of use amidst the rise of prevailing new Buddhist beliefs, which put greater emphasis on the transience of human life. Commoners and the elite in outlying regions, however, continued to use kofun until the late seventh century, and simpler but distinctive tombs continued in use throughout the following period.

In 675 the use of livestock and the consumption of some wild animals (horse, cattle, dogs, monkeys, birds) was banned by Emperor Tenmu due to the influence of Buddhism. This ban was renewed throughout the Asuka period, but ended with the Heian period. The pest animals, deer and wild boar, were not affected by this ban.

== Influence of Taoism ==
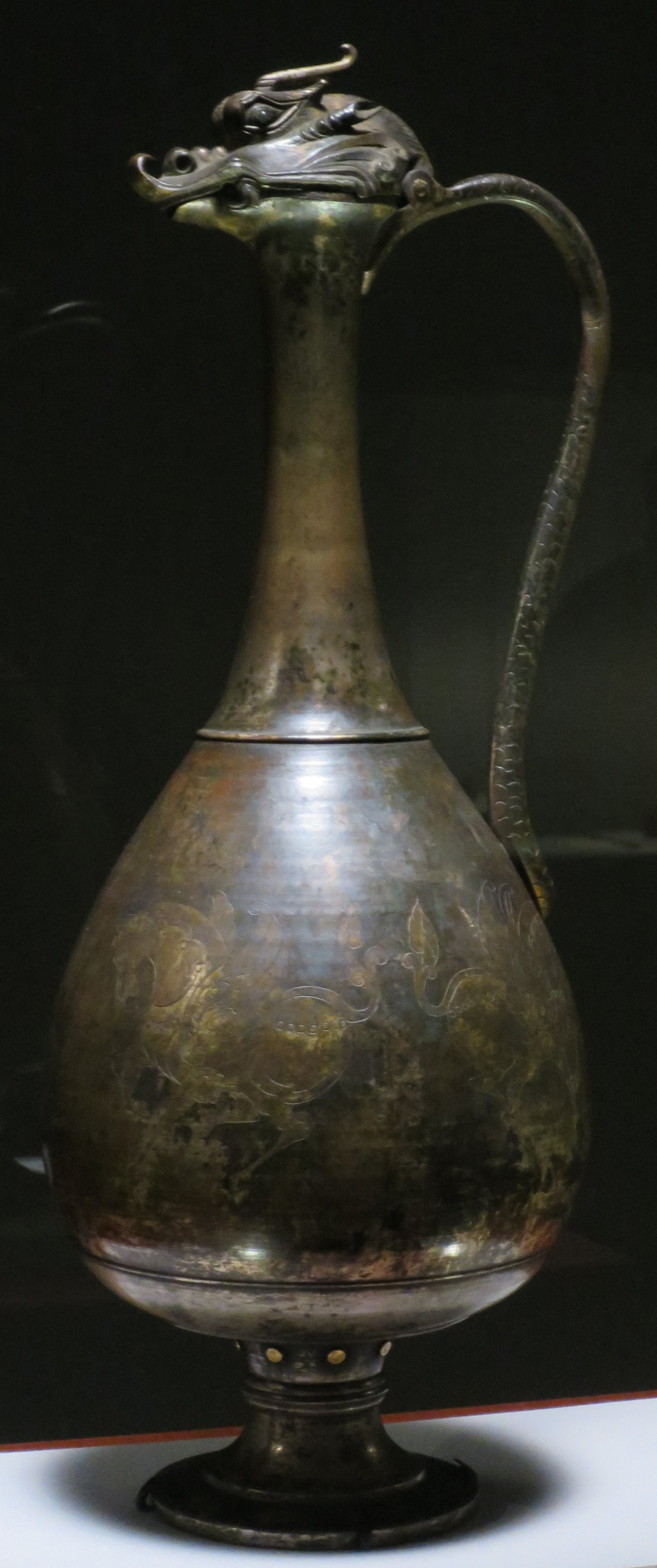
A dragon-head pitcher with Pegasus pattern incised, gilded bronze with silver, Asuka period, 7th century, former Horyu-ji Temple treasures, Tokyo National Museum

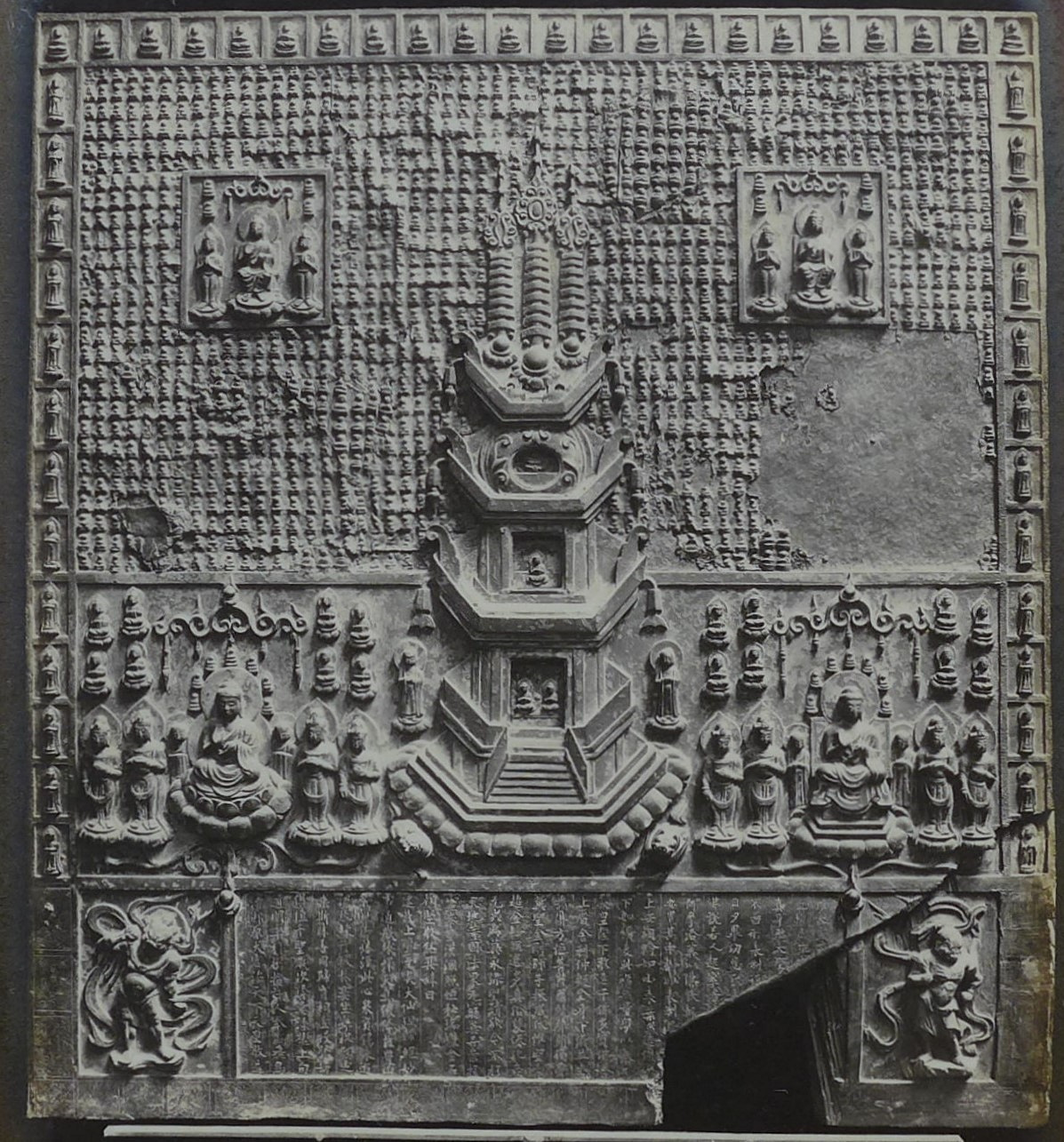
Bronze plaque depicting Shaka delivering a sermon, dated 698 AD, Hase-dera Temple, Sakurai, Nara

Taoism was also introduced during the Asuka period. The octagonal shape of monarchs' tombs of this age and the celestial maps drawn in the Kitora and Takamatsuzuka kofun reflect the Taoist cosmology.

Taoist belief was eventually amalgamated with Shintō and Buddhism to establish new styles of rituals. Onmyōdō (陰陽道), a sort of Japanese geomancy and cosmology, is one of the fruits of these religious mixtures. While the Asuka period started with conflicts between clans over religious beliefs, later in the period, the imported religions became syncretized with Japan's native folk beliefs.

== Art and architecture ==
=== Asuka culture ===
Some architectural structures built in the period still remain today. Wooden buildings at Hōryū-ji, built in the seventh century, show some influence from Chinese and west Asian countries. For instance, the pillars at Hōryū-ji are similar to the pillars of the Parthenon of ancient Greece, as seen in their entasis. The five-storied pagoda (五重の塔, go-jū no tō) is a transformation from the Indian mound-like reliquary structure called a stupa. In addition, mural paintings in the Takamatsuzuka and Kitora kofun dating from the fifth century show strong influence from Tang dynasty and Goguryeo wall painting.

The Japanese Buddhist sculpture art of this period is believed to have followed the style of the Six Dynasties of China. The characteristics of the sculptures of this age are also referred to as Tori Style, taken from the name of prominent sculptor Kuratsukuri Tori, grandson of Chinese immigrant Shiba Tatto. Some of the characteristics of the style include marked, almond-shaped eyes, and symmetrically arranged folds in the clothing. The most striking and distinguishing feature of these sculptures is an expression of the smile that is called the "archaic smile". Kudara Kannon at Hōryū-ji is the most prominent Buddhist sculpture from this period.

=== Hakuhō culture ===
The second stage of Buddhist art, coming after the Asuka (cultural) period, is known as the Hakuhō culture (白鳳文化, Hakuhō Bunka), and is generally dated from the Taika Reform (646) until the moving of the capital to Nara in 710. During the latter half of the 8th century, a large number of songs and poems were composed and performed by various ranked people from warriors to the Emperor. The earliest collection of these poems is known as the Man'yōshū (万葉集; "collection of 10,000 leaves"). This includes works by several remarkable poets such as Princess Nukata and Kakinomoto no Hitomaro. Waka (和歌; "Japanese song") also emerged as a new form of poetry at this time. This term was coined to distinguish native styles from those imported from China; within the umbrella of waka poetry, one of the more popular forms is known as tanka (短歌; "short song"). It consists of a total of 31 Japanese syllables (morae) divided over five lines, in the syllabic pattern 5/7/5/7/7.

== Events ==
- 538: The Korean kingdom of Baekje dispatches a delegation to introduce Buddhism to the Japanese Emperor.
- 592: Introduction of Buddhism to the Imperial court, according to the Nihon Shoki
- 593: Prince Shōtoku is assigned as regent of Empress Suiko and promotes Buddhism with the Soga clan.
- 600: Yamato Imperial Court sends the first official Japanese mission to China since 478.
- 604: Prince Shōtoku issues a Chinese-style constitution (Seventeen-article constitution), based on Confucian principles, which de facto inaugurated the Japanese Empire.
- 607: Prince Shōtoku builds the Buddhist temple Hōryūji in Ikaruga.
- 645: Soga no Iruka and his father Emishi are killed in the Isshi Incident.
  - Emperor Kōtoku ascends to the throne and strengthens imperial power over the aristocratic clans (see Taika Reform), turning their states into provinces.
- 663: The Japanese navy was defeated by the Silla-Tang alliance in Battle of Baekgang, failing to restore Baekje.
- 670: The first family registry (庚午年籍, Kōgo Nenjaku) was compiled.
- 672: Prince Ōama, later Emperor Tenmu usurped the throne by winning the Jinshin no Ran (壬申の乱) civil war against Emperor Kōbun.
- 689: The Asuka Kiyomihara Code was proclaimed.
- 694: The imperial capital is moved to Fujiwara-kyō, in present-day Kashihara city.
- 701: The Taihō Code was proclaimed.
- 705: The Nishiyama Onsen Keiunkan is founded. It survives to become the oldest known hotel business still in operation, as of 2019.
- 708: The first Japanese coin (和同開珎, Wadōkaichin) was minted.

== See also ==
- Tanzan Shrine
- Tenmu period

== Notes ==
| Preceded by Kofun period | History of Japan | Succeeded by Nara period |
