= List of cultural properties of Japan – structures (Nara) =

This list is of the cultural properties of Japan designated in the category of structures (建造物, kenzōbutsu) for the Prefecture of Nara.

== National Cultural Properties ==
As of 1 November 2015, two hundred and sixty-three Important Cultural Properties (including sixty-four *National Treasure) with three hundred and eight-four (*seventy-one) component structures have been designated, being of national significance.

| Property | Date | Municipality | Comments | Image | Coordinates | Ref. |
|---|---|---|---|---|---|---|
| Anraku-ji Tōba 安楽寺塔婆; Anrakuji tōba | Kamakura period (second half) | Gose | | | 34°25′57″N 135°45′08″E | |
| Izanami-no-Mikoto Jinja Honden 伊弉冊命神社本殿; Izanami-no-mikoto Jinja honden | 1580 | Ikaruga | | | 34°36′21″N 135°43′58″E | |
| Uda Mikumari Jinja Massha Munakata Jinja Honden 宇太水分神社末社宗像神社本殿; Uda Mikumari Jinja massha Munakata Jinja honden | late Muromachi period | Uda | first from the right | | 34°28′29″N 135°58′15″E | |
| Uda Mikumari Jinja Massha Kasuga Jinja Honden 宇太水分神社末社春日神社本殿; Uda Mikumari Jinja massha Kasuga Jinja honden | mid-Muromachi period | Uda | second from the right | | 34°28′29″N 135°58′15″E | |
| Unatari Niimasu Takamimusubi Jinja Honden 宇太水分神社末社春日神社本殿; Unatari Niimasu Takamimusubi Jinja honden | early Muromachi period | Nara | | | 34°41′24″N 135°48′06″E | |
| Enshō-ji Gorintō 円証寺五輪塔; Enshōji gorintō | 1550 | Ikoma | | | 34°42′49″N 135°43′38″E | |
| Enshō-ji Hondō 円証寺五輪塔; Enshōji hondō | 1552 | Ikoma | | | 34°42′50″N 135°43′39″E | |
| Omiashi Jinja Stone Tōba 於美阿志神社石塔婆; Omiashi Jinja ishi tōba | late Heian period | Asuka | | | 34°27′24″N 135°48′11″E | |
| Oka-dera Shoin 岡寺書院; Okadera shoin | 1644 | Asuka | | | 34°28′19″N 135°49′41″E | |
| Oka-dera Niōmon 岡寺仁王門; Okadera Niōmon | 1612 | Asuka | | | 34°28′18″N 135°49′39″E | |
| Otomura Family Residence 音村家住宅; Otomura-ke jūtaku | Edo period | Kashihara | | | 34°30′26″N 135°47′14″E | |
| Kawaike Family Residence 河合家住宅; Kawaike-ke jūtaku | late Edo period | Kashihara | designation comprises two components: the main house and barn | | 34°30′24″N 135°47′19″E | |
| Kairyūō-ji Kyōzō 海竜王寺経蔵; Kairyūōji kyōzō | 1288 | Nara | | | 34°41′33″N 135°48′21″E | |
| Kairyūō-ji West Kondō 海竜王寺西金堂; Kairyūōji nishi kondō | Nara period | Nara | | | 34°41′34″N 135°48′19″E | |
| Kakuan-ji Gorintō 額安寺五輪塔; Kakuanji gorintō | Kamakura and early Muromachi periods | Yamatokōriyama | eight gorintō, two of which date from 1297 | | 34°36′03″N 135°46′20″E | |
| Kashihara Jingū Honden 橿原神宮本殿; Kashihara Jingū honden | 1855 | Kashihara | | | 34°29′19″N 135°47′10″E | |
| Kikō-ji Hondō 喜光寺本堂; Kikōji hondō | early Muromachi period | Nara | | | 34°41′05″N 135°46′39″E | |
| Kikuya Family Residence 菊家家住宅; Kikuya-ke jūtaku | mid-Edo period | Nara | | | 34°42′38″N 136°00′27″E | |
| Yoshimizu Jinja Shoin 吉水神社書院; Yoshimizu Jinja shoin | Muromachi and Momoyama periods | Yoshino | | | 34°22′02″N 135°51′43″E | |
| Kichiden-ji Tahōtō 吉田寺多宝塔; Kichidenji tahōtō | 1463 | Ikaruga | | | 34°36′17″N 135°43′33″E | |
| Taima-dera Yakushi-dō 當麻寺薬師堂; Taimadera Yakushidō | 1447 | Katsuragi | | | 34°30′59″N 135°41′47″E | |

== Prefectural Cultural Properties ==
As of 1 May 2015, one hundred and sixteen properties with one hundred and eighty-eight component structures have been designated at a prefectural level.

| Property | Date | Municipality | Comments | Image | Coordinates | Ref. |
|---|---|---|---|---|---|---|
| Konbu-in Daimon 興福院大門; Konbu-in daimon | early Edo period | Nara | | | 34°41′42″N 135°49′21″E | for all refs see |
| Saidai-ji South Gate 西大寺南門; Saidaiji nanmon | Muromachi period | Nara | | | 34°41′37″N 135°46′46″E | |
| Saidai-ji Aizen-dō 西大寺愛染堂; Saidaiji Aizendō | Edo period | Nara | | | 34°41′37″N 135°46′46″E | |
| Saidai-ji Gorintō 西大寺愛染堂; Saidaiji gorintō | late Kamakura period | Nara | | | 34°41′37″N 135°46′46″E | |
| Jurin-in Mie-dō 十輪院御影堂; Jurin-in Miedō | 1650 | Nara | | | 34°40′35″N 135°50′00″E | |
| Taima-dera Niōmon 當麻寺仁王門; Taimadera Niōmon | | Katsuragi | | | 34°30′59″N 135°41′47″E | |
| Oka-dera Rōmon 岡寺楼門; Okadera rōmon | Momoyama period | Asuka | | | 34°28′18″N 135°49′42″E | |
| Oka-dera Hondō 岡寺本堂; Okadera hondō | 1805 | Asuka | | | 34°28′18″N 135°49′42″E | |
| Tsuji Family Residence 辻家住宅; Tsuji-ke jūtaku | Edo period | Totsukawa | designation comprises two components: the main building (1725) and front gate (1853) | | | |
| Tenshō-ji Yakushi-dō 天照寺薬師堂; Tenshōji Yakushidō | 1584 | Higashiyoshino | | | 34°23′32″N 135°58′58″E | |

== Municipal Cultural Properties ==
As of 1 May 2015, eighty properties with one hundred and six component structures have been designated at a municipal level.

| Property | Date | Municipality | Comments | Image | Coordinates | Ref. |
|---|---|---|---|---|---|---|
| Byakugō-ji Hondō 白毫寺本堂; Byakugōji hondō | early Edo period | Nara | | | 34°40′16″N 135°51′05″E | |
| Konbu-in Tamaya 興福院霊屋; Konbu-in tamaya | 1715 | Nara | | | 34°41′42″N 135°49′21″E | |
| Kasuga Taisha Keishōden 春日大社桂昌殿; Kasuga Taisha Keishōden | 1699 | Nara | donated by Keishōin (桂昌院), the mother of Tokugawa Tsunayoshi | | 34°40′53″N 135°50′54″E | |
| Kasuga Taisha Shikyakumon 春日大社四脚門; Kasuga Taisha shikyakumon | C17 (first half) | Nara | | | 34°40′53″N 135°50′54″E | |
| Mori Family Residence 森家住宅; Mori-ke jūtaku | c.1887-96 | Nara | | | 34°40′40″N 135°49′39″E | |

== Registered Cultural Properties ==
As of 1 November 2015, two hundred and eighteen properties have been registered (as opposed to designated) at a national level.

| Property | Date | Municipality | Comments | Image | Coordinates | Ref. |
|---|---|---|---|---|---|---|
| Kaiun Bridge 開運橋; Kaiun-kyō | 1931 | Sangō | | | 34°36′25″N 135°40′14″E | |
| Yoshino Jingū Rear Approach Torii 吉野神宮裏鳥居; Yoshino Jingū ura torii | 1890 | Yoshino | relocated in 1930 | | 34°23′06″N 135°50′46″E | |
| Kobai-en Store 古梅園店舗; Kobai-en tenpo | Taishō period | Nara | Kobai-en has been making sumi since 1577 | | 34°40′51″N 135°49′39″E | |
| Honzen-ji Hondō 本善寺本堂; Honzenji hondō | mid-Edo period | Yoshino | repaired in 1809 and 1900 | | 34°23′35″N 135°51′33″E | |
| Honzen-ji Chajo 本善寺茶所; Honzenji chajo | 1798 | Yoshino | | | 34°23′36″N 135°51′33″E | |
| Nanto Bank Main Branch 南都銀行本店; Nanto Ginkō honten | 1926 | Nara | | | 34°40′56″N 135°49′43″E | |

== See also ==
- Cultural Properties of Japan
- National Treasures of Japan
- List of Historic Sites of Japan (Nara)
- Nara National Museum
- List of Cultural Properties of Japan - paintings (Nara)
