= Daikandai-ji =

Archaeological site in Asuka, Nara, Japan

Daikan-daiji
- 大官大寺跡 (Japanese)
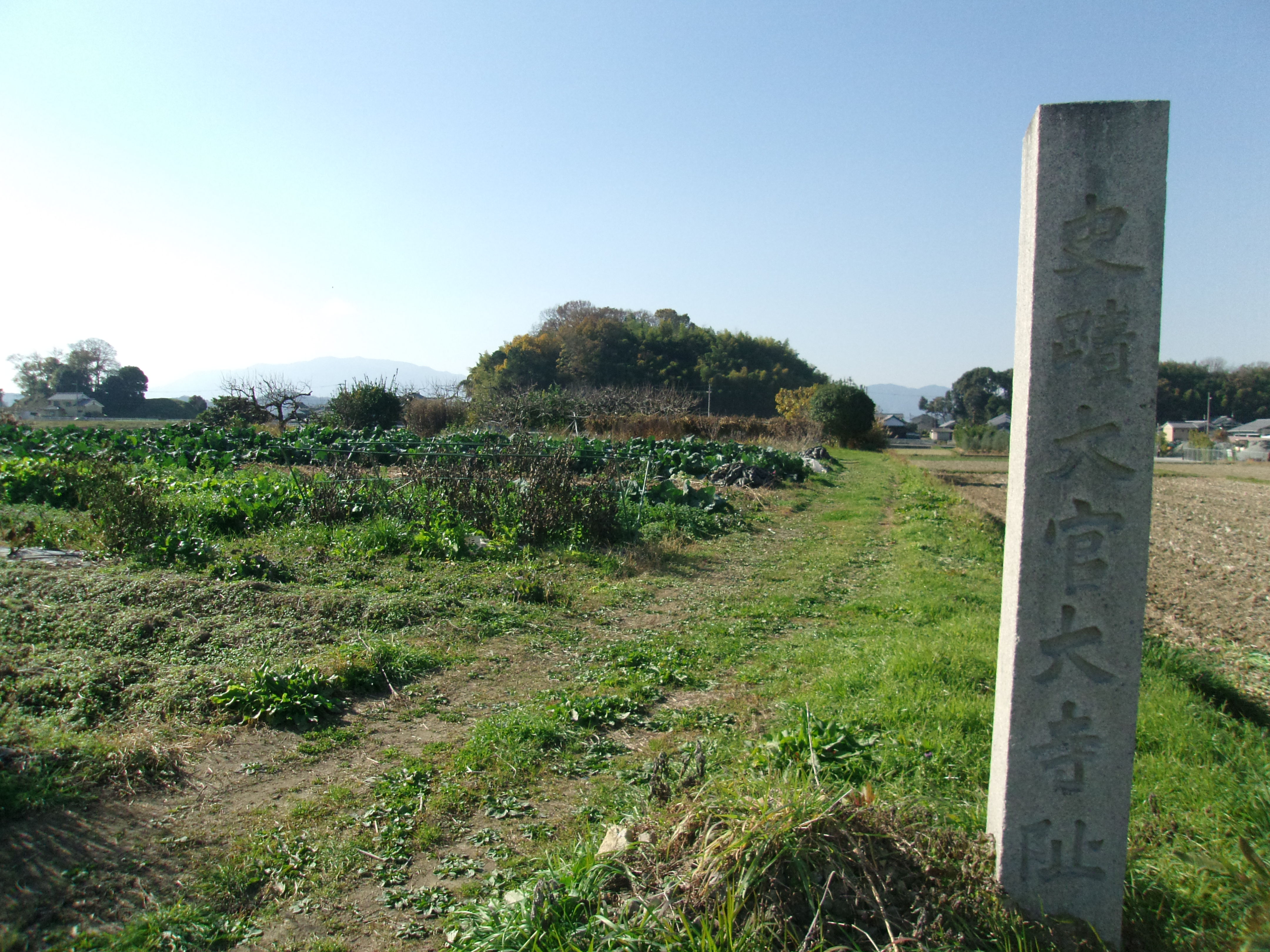
- Daikan-daiji ruins

- Daikan-daiji ruins Daikandai-ji (Japan)
- 34°29′18″N 135°49′05″E
- Type: temple ruins
- Periods: Asuka period
- Location: Asuka, Nara, Japan
- Region: Kansai region

History
- Built: c.677 AD

Site notes
- Public access: Yes
- National Historic Site of Japan

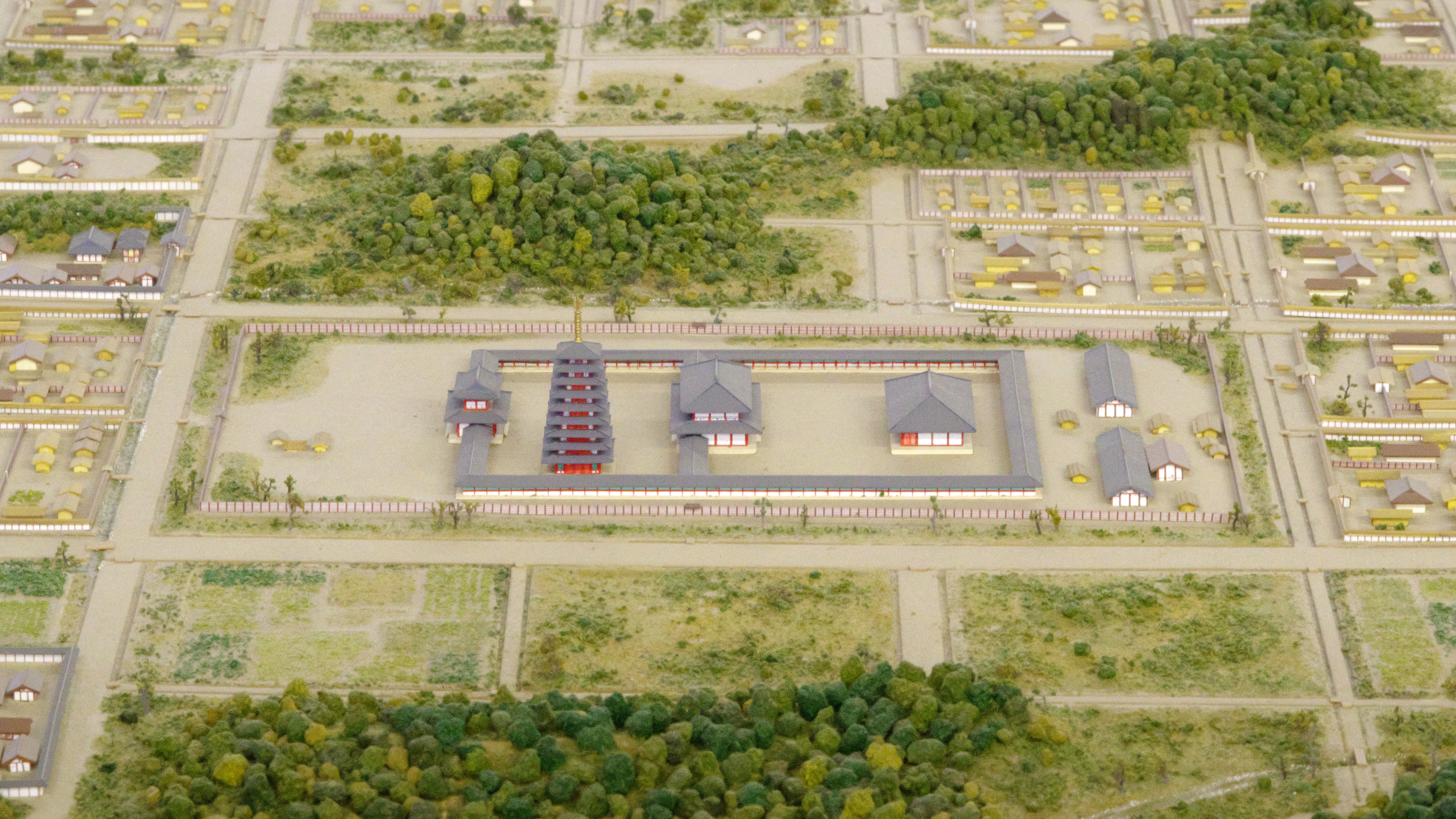
A model of the Daikan-daiji temple complex, seen from the east. Part of a 1/1000 scale model of Fujiwara-kyo, Kashihara City Fujiwara-kyo Archives

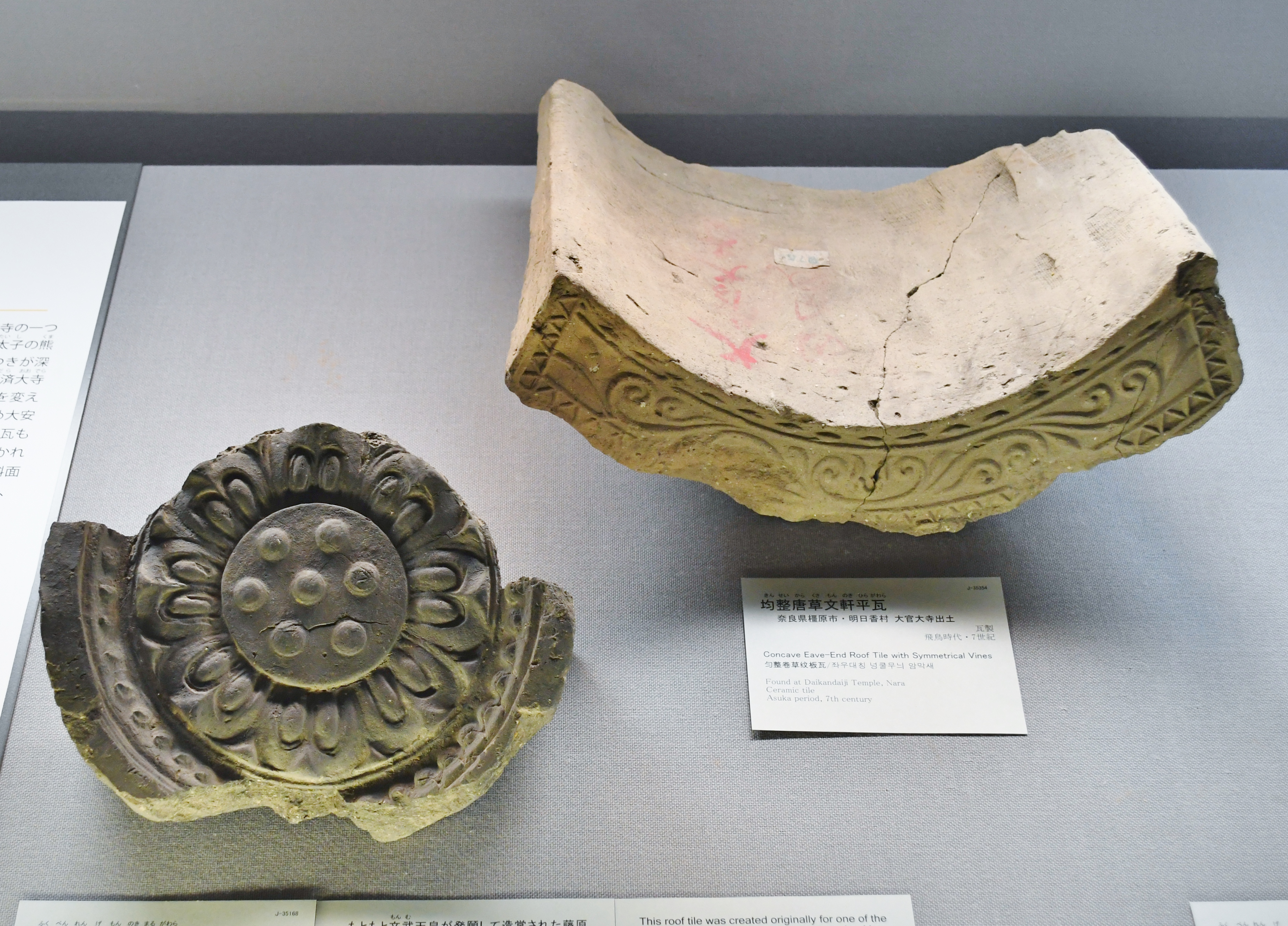
Roof tiles from the Daikan-daiji site

Daikan-daiji ruins (大官大寺跡, Daikan-daiji ato) is an archaeological site with the ruins of an Asuka period Buddhist temple located in the village of Asuka, Nara, Japan. It was designated as a National Historic Site in 1921.

== History ==
The Daikan-daiji ruins are located on the right bank of the Asuka River, on flat land south of Mount Amanokagu. According to the Daianji Garan Engi and Ruki Shizaichō (Daianji Zaichō) from 747 and the Nihon Shoki and Shoku Nihongi, when Prince Tamura (later Emperor Jomei) visited the sick Prince Shōtoku, he asked him to rebuild the Kumagoi Seisha as an official temple. By tradition, the Kumagoi Seisha was located in what is now Yamatokōriyama, and corresponds to the ruins of Nukata-dera. Prince Tamura, following the wishes of the prince, began building a large palace and a large temple on the banks of the Kudara River in 639. This temple was known as the Kudara-no-Ōdera (百済大寺), and the Kibi-ike temple ruins (National Historic Site) in Sakurai, Nara are believed to be its ruins. Per the Nihon Shoki and the Daian-ji Zaizaichō (Record of Daian-ji Temple Collection), the temple was relocated by Emperor Temmu in 673, and renamed the Takaichi-Ōdera (高市大寺) and was subsequently renamed Daikandai-ji (大官大寺) in 677. Construction the temple continued during the reign of Emperor Monmu (697-707). However, archaeological evidence indicates that the Takaichi-no-Ōdera and the Daikan-daiji were most likely two completely separate temples, with the location of Takaichi-no-Ōdera most likely to have been the Kinomoto temple ruins located northwest of Mt. Kaguyama and east of Fujiwara Palace.

Although site the temple remained abandoned for many centuries, but the remains of the foundation platform for the Main Hall and a pagoda remained, so the site of Daikan-daiji has always been known. When it was surveyed at the end of the Edo period and beginning of the Meiji period, 45 foundation stones remained at the Main Hall site, and 34 foundation stones and the central stone at the pagoda site, but most of the foundation stones were removed when construction work for Kashihara Shrine began in 1889. The earthen platform at the Main Hall site had previously been thought to be the remains of a Lecture Hall because the nearby hamlet name was "Kōdō", but later archaeological excavations revealed that it was actually the remains of a Main Hall. The Main Hall was 9 bays long (45 meters) and 4 bays wide (21 meters), and the pagoda was 5 bays wide. Excavations conducted by the Nara National Research Institute for Cultural Properties from 1973 to 1982 revealed the layout of the temple complex to have been central gate, main hall, and lecture hall lined up in a straight line from north to south, with corridors extending from the left and right of the central gate leading to the main hall, and the pagoda located on the east side of the square area surrounded by the corridors (right in front of the main hall). In addition, the existence of post-hole walls dividing the temple grounds was confirmed to the east, west, and north of the temple complex, but no remains of any buildings were found on the west side of the corridors. The east-west corridors continued further north and closed behind the lecture hall. In other words, the lecture hall was surrounded by a corridor. The pagoda is a large structure with six pillars on each side of the first floor and five bays (15 meters) between them, and is presumed to have been a nine-story pagoda. It is a much larger temple than other large temples of the Asuka period. The temple grounds were planned to match the grid of Fujiwara-kyō.

Burnt soil and burnt roof tiles were found in the excavated remains of the temple grounds. In some places, traces of burnt rafters from the roof that had fallen into the ground were still visible, and in the holes left by the scaffolding at the middle gate and corridors, burn marks were also found in the holes left by the scaffolding from the construction work, suggesting that the fire occurred during construction. From the above, it was determined that the main buildings of the temple, such as the main hall, had only just been completed, and that the fire occurred while the middle gate and corridors were still under construction.

When the capital was moved to Heijō-kyō in 716–17, Daikan-daiji, along with Yakushi-ji, and Gangō-ji, was also moved to the new capital, with Daikan-daiji becoming Daian-ji in 729.

The Daikandai-ji site is about a 4.6 kilometers northeast from Asuka Station on the Kintetsu Railway Yoshino Line, or one kilometer northwest of the Asuka Historical Museum.

== See also ==
- List of Historic Sites of Japan (Nara)
