= Daian-ji =

Buddhist temple in Nara, Japan

- 大安寺
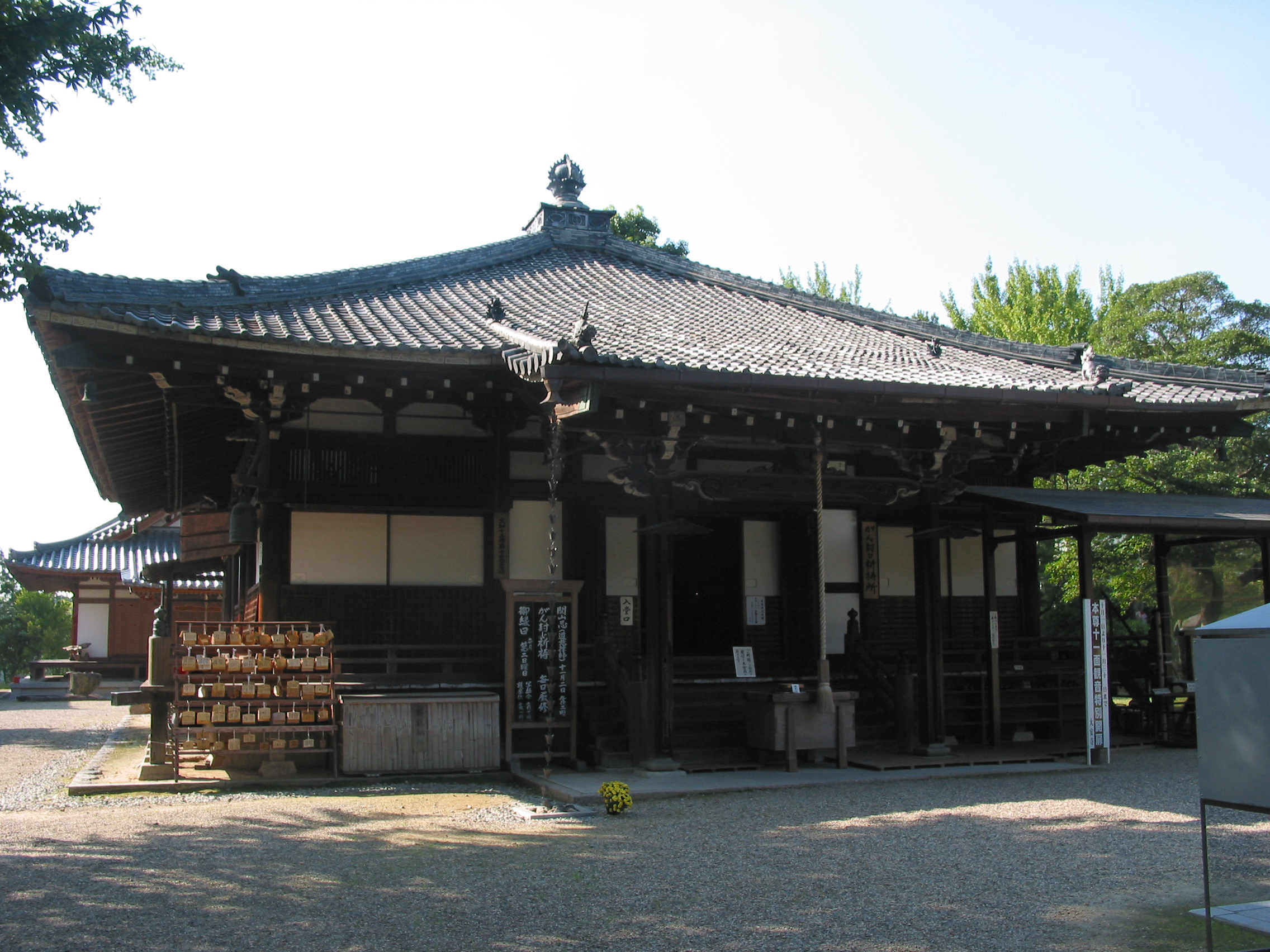
- Daian-ji Hondō

- Location within Nara Prefecture Location within Japan

Religion
- Affiliation: Buddhist
- Deity: Nyōirin Kannon
- Rite: Kōyasan Shingon-shū
- Status: functional

Location
- Location: 2-18-1 Daianji, Nara-shi, Nara-ken
- Country: Japan
- Interactive map of Daian-ji
- Coordinates: 34°40′4.8″N 135°48′45.8″E

Architecture
- Founder: c.Eperor Jomei
- Completed: Asuka period

Website
- Official website
- National Historic Site of Japan

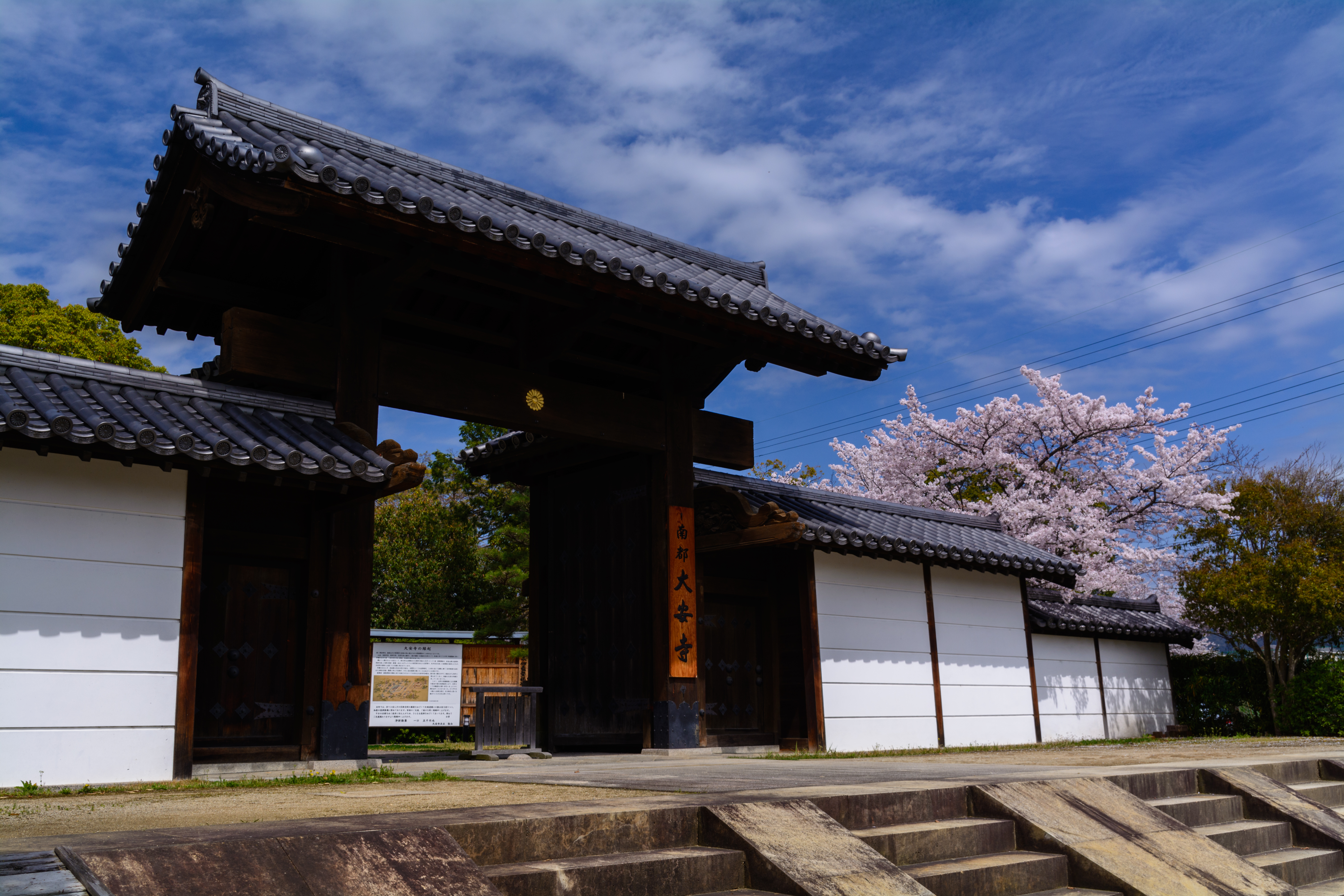
South gate

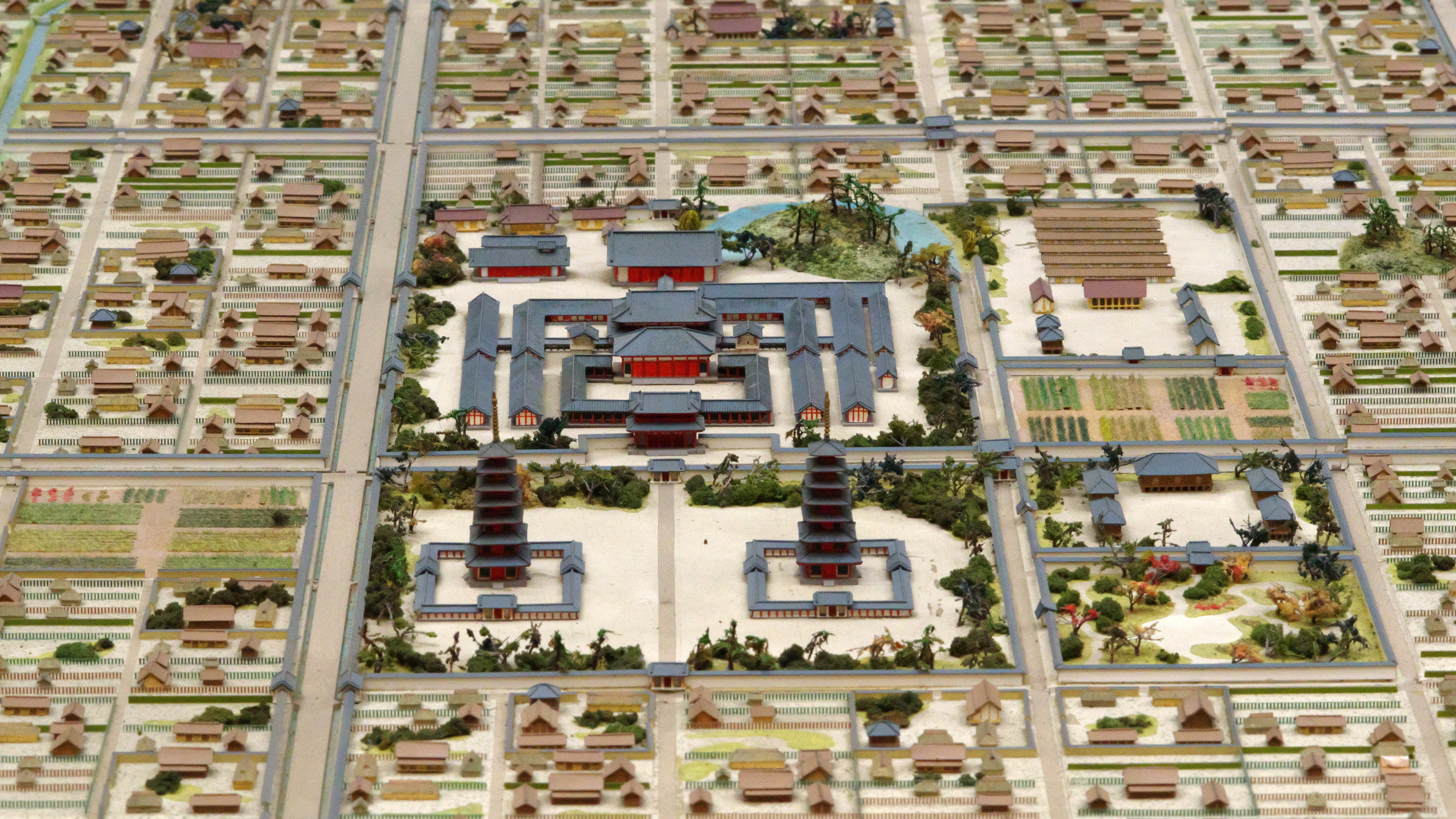
A model of the garan of Daian-ji at the Nara period, seen from the south side, a part of 1/1000 scale model of Heijōkyō held by Nara City Hall.

Daian-ji (大安寺) is a Buddhist temple located in the city of Nara, Nara Prefecture, Japan. It was founded by Emperor Jomei in 639 as one of the first official temples in Japan at the capital of Asuka-kyō and was subsequent relocated to Heijō-kyō with the relocation of the capital, where it became one of the Seven Great Temples of Nara, Japan. It subsequently fell into decline and now is only a small fragment of its former size and importance. Its former precincts were designated a National Historic Site in 1929.

== History ==
The history of this temple is based on the Daianji Garan Engi and Ruki Shizaichō (Daianji Zaichō) from 747 and the Nihon Shoki and Shoku Nihongi. According to these, when Prince Tamura (later Emperor Jomei) visited the sick Prince Shōtoku, he asked him to rebuild the Kumagoi Seisha as an official temple. By tradition, the Kumagoi Seisha was located in what is now Yamatokōriyama, and corresponds to the ruins of Nukata-dera.

=== Kudara-no-Ōdera ===
Prince Tamura, following the wishes of the prince, began building a large palace and a large temple on the banks of the Kudara River in 639. This was called the Kudara-no-Ōdera (百済大寺) and is regarded as the first official temple in Japan. The exact location of this temple was unknown for many years, and numerous locations have been proposed; however, in 1997 the Nara National Research Institute for Cultural Properties announced that the Kibi-ike temple ruins southwest of Sakurai, Nara were verified as the location of Kudara-no-Ōdera. These temple ruins are located to the east of the Fujiwara-kyō palace ruins. The Kibi-ike temple ruins had a layout patterned on Hōryū-ji, with a main hall to the east and a pagoda to the west, and the style and date of the excavated ancient roof tiles suggest that this temple was built in the first half of the 7th century.

=== Takaichi-daiji ===
On December 17, 673, the second year of Emperor Tenmu's reign, Kudara-no-Ōdera was relocated and renamed the Takaichi-no-Ōdera (高市大寺) The previous year, Emperor Tenmu (Prince Ōama) won the Jinshin War, and the year the temple was moved coincided with the 33rd anniversary of the death of Emperor Tenmu's father, Emperor Jomei, and the13th anniversary of the deaths of his mother, Empress Saimei.

=== Daikan-daiji Temple ===
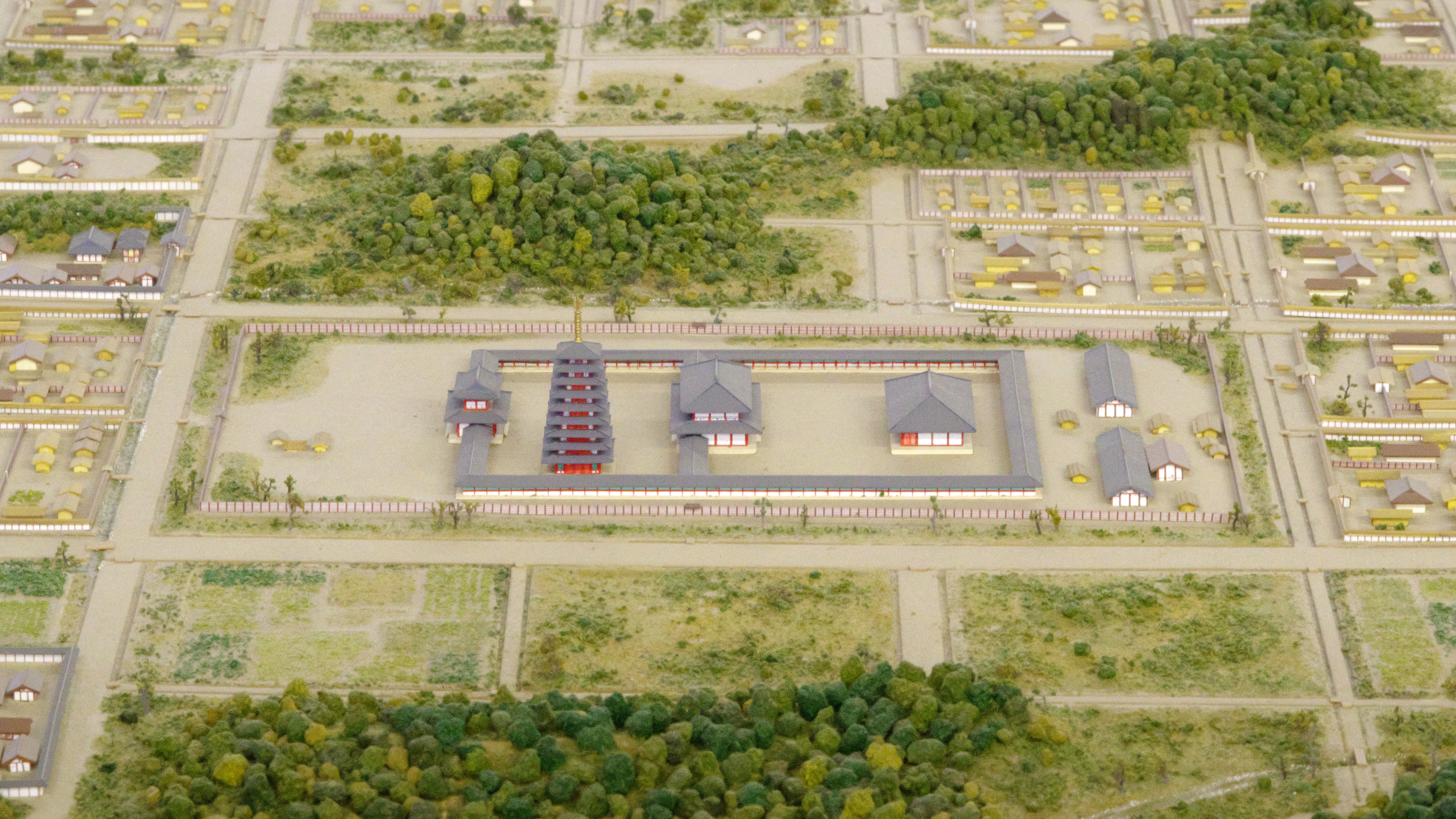
A model of the Daikan-daiji temple complex, seen from the east. Part of a 1/1000 scale model of Fujiwara-kyo, Kashihara City Fujiwara-kyo Archives

The Nihon Shoki and the Daian-ji Zaizaichō (Record of Daian-ji Temple Collection) indicate that in 677, Takaichi-no-Ōdera was renamed Daikan-daiji (大官大寺). Construction the temple continued during the reign of Emperor Monmu (697-707). However, archaeological evidence indicates that the Takaichi-no-Ōdera and the Daikan-daiji were most likely two completely separate temples, with the location of Takaichi-no-Ōdera most likely to have been the Kinomoto temple ruins located northwest of Mt. Kaguyama and east of Fujiwara Palace. When the capital was moved to Heijō-kyō in 716–17, Daikan-daiji, along with Yakushi-ji, and Gangō-ji, was also moved to the new capital, becoming Daian-ji in 729. The ruins of Daikan-daiji are now a National Historic Site.

=== Daian-ji ===
The Daian-ji temple complex was almost complete by around 738, except for the eastern and western pagodas. The eastern pagoda was built in the latter half of the Nara period, and the western pagoda was built between the end of the Nara period and the beginning of the Heian period, making it the last of the main temple buildings. Unlike Daikandai-ji, where the pagodas were nine-story structures, the pagodas at Daian-ji were built as seven-story structures. Heijō-kyō was laid out in a grid pattern with a street every one chō (about 109 meters). Daian-ji extended over an area of three chō east-west and five chō north-south. The distinctive feature of the layout of the temple complex is that the east and west pagodas were far away from the main hall, and were built on the outside (south) of the Great South Gate. The Sugiyama Kofun located to the north of the temple complex was incorporated into the temple grounds.

During this period, Daian-ji, along with Gangō-ji, was one of the two major schools of Sanron Buddhism in Japan. Sanron Buddhism was established by Kashō Daishi Kissō (549-623) during the Sui dynasty. Dōji, a student of Kissō and a monk who stayed in Tang China for 16 years, brought a new translation of the Golden Light Sutra, which was considered a scripture to protect the country, to Japan and was the head abbot of Daian-ji. According to the record for 747 in the Daian-ji Asset Register, there were 887 monks living at Daian-ji at that time and the temple played a major role in the development of Buddhism in Japan. Monks from Daian-ji persuaded the Tang monk Jianzhen and the Indian monk Bodhisena to come to Japan. Many of the teachers of Kūkai and Saichō were monks of Daian-ji.

After the capital was moved to Heian-kyō, Kūkai was appointed as the head priest of Daian-ji Temple in 829. However, as Buddhism shifted its focus to esoteric Buddhism, centered on Tō-ji and Enryaku-ji, Daian-ji gradually declined. In 911 a fire destroyed many temple buildings. In 949, the West Pagoda was burned down by lightning, and on March 1, 1017, a major fire broke out, destroying all the buildings except for the honzon Shaka Nyorai statue (said by the twelfth-century Oe no Chikamichi in Shichidaiji Junrei Shiki to have been the finest work in Nara)ref name="Heibonsha"/> and the East Pagoda. The main temple was rebuilt by 1116, but it never regained its former size or importance. It later became a branch temple of Kofuku-ji. The aforementioned Shaka Nyorai statue was subsequently lost during the 1596 Keichō–Fushimi earthquake. By the Edo period, only a small Kannon chapel remained. The stone bases of the former twin pagodas were removed for reuse at Kashihara Jingū in 1889, while the ruins of the other buildings lie in adjacent properties. The current main hall was built in 1922. To the south of the temple is Motoishiyama Hachiman-gu Shrine, a former guardian shrine, which was once within the temple's precincts.

== Cultural properties ==
The six of nine Nara period statues surviving at Daian-ji have been designated Important Cultural Properties. These statues are thought to have been made at end of the Nara period, but each statue is heavily damaged and most of the arms and other parts have been replaced. As no statues matching these names can be found in the "Daian-ji Temple Asset Register" from 781, they are thought to have been made after that time.

Jūichimen Kannon,
Senjū Kannon,
Fukūkensaku Kannon,
Yōryū Kannon,
Shō Kannon,
Four Heavenly Kings.
Temple records of the Tenpyō era (747) have also been designated an Important Cultural Property and are now held in Chiba Prefecture.

== See also ==
- Historical Sites of Prince Shōtoku
- Nanto Shichi Daiji
- Thirteen Buddhist Sites of Yamato
- List of Historic Sites of Japan (Nara)
