= Kibi-ike temple ruins =

Archeological site in Nara, Japan

- 吉備池廃寺跡 (Japanese)
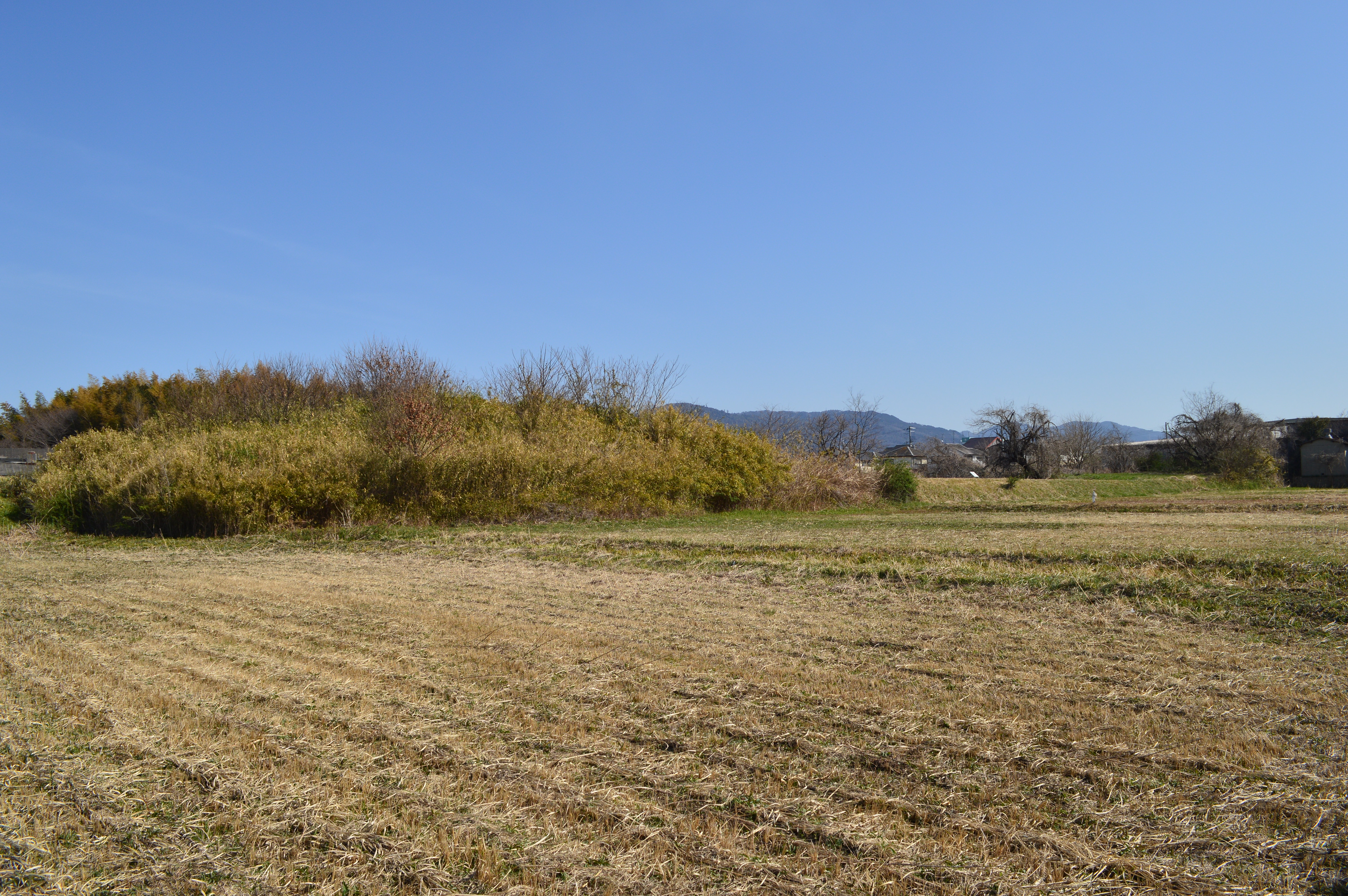
- Kibi-ike temple ruins

- Kibi-ike temple ruins Kibi-ike temple ruins (Japan)
- Interactive map of Kibi-ike temple ruins
- 34°30′16.6″N 135°50′2.05″E
- Type: temple ruins
- Periods: Asuka period
- Location: Sakurai, Nara, Japan
- Region: Kansai region

History
- Built: 639 AD

Site notes
- Public access: Yes

Kibi-ike temple ruins (吉備池廃寺跡, Kibi-ike haiji ato) is an archaeological site with the ruins of an Asuka period Buddhist temple located in the city of Sakurai, Nara, Japan. It was designated as a National Historic Site in 2002.

== History ==
The Kibi-ike temple ruins are located on the south bank of Kibi-ike pond, a reservoir from the early modern period, located in the southeast of the Nara Basin and northeast of Mount Amanokagu. Currently, the northern half of the main temple complex overlaps with Kibi-ike pond. Major archaeological excavations were carried out from 1997 to 2000. The temple complex is laid out in the Hōryū-ji style, and remains of the foundations of the Main Hall, Pagoda, Middle Gate, corridor, and monks' quarters have been discovered. In addition to being the oldest example of a Hōryūji-style temple layout, the nine-story pagoda, estimated to be 80–90 meters tall, size of the Main Hall, and the scale of the temple complex far surpass those of domestic temples of the same era, and are noteworthy for being comparable to Hwangnyongsa Temple in Silla and Daian-ji Temple during the Nara period.

It is estimated to have been built in the 630s to early 640s during the Asuka period, and since it appears to have been relocated shortly thereafter. The only temple known from historical records such as the Nihon Shoki which corresponds is the Kudara-no-Ōdera (百済大寺) (the predecessor of Daian-ji), which was built by the 34th Emperor Jomei in 639. The site of "Kudara-no-Ōdera", which was one of the first Buddhist temples constructed in Japan, had up until this time been considered lost.

According to the Daianji Garan Engi and Ruki Shizaichō (Daianji Zaichō) from 747 and the Nihon Shoki and Shoku Nihongi, when Prince Tamura (later Emperor Jomei) visited the sick Prince Shōtoku, he asked him to rebuild the Kumagoi Seisha as an official temple. By tradition, the Kumagoi Seisha was located in what is now Yamatokōriyama, and corresponds to the ruins of Nukata-dera. Prince Tamura, following the wishes of the prince, began building a large palace and a large temple on the banks of the Kudara River in 639. The Daian-ji Garan Engi Heiruki Zaizaichō also states that the construction of a sub-shrine led to the gods becoming angry and burning down the nine-story pagoda and the main hall; however, no such event is mentioned in the Nihon Shoki and it is not supported by any archaeological evidence. The temple was relocated by Emperor Temmu in 673, then renamed the Takaichi-Ōdera (高市大寺) and then Daikandai-ji (大官大寺) in 677. It was moved to Fujiwara-kyō by Emperor Monmu in 701 and then to Heijō-kyō in 716.

The temple grounds measured 260 meters north-to-south and 180 meters east-to-west. The layout of the buildings was centered on an enclosed courtyard with the Main Hall to the east and the Pagoda to the west and the Middle Gate to the south. The foundations of the Main Hall and Pagoda overlap with the bank of Kibi-ike pond. The Main Hall foundations measure 37 by 25 meters, which is more that three times the size of the foundations of the Hōryū-ji Kondō. No foundation stones remain, but from the size, it corresponds to a seven-by-four bay structure. The foundation was built using tamped earth. This technique is also seen at Hōryū-ji, and is considered to be a North Chinese technique that is distinct from the Baekje techniques used at Asuka-dera, and is presumed to have been brought back by Japanese envoys from the Sui dynasty.

The foundations of the Pagoda have not been excavated. The foundation measures approximately 32 meters on each side with an estimated restored height of 2.8 meters. The scale of the foundation is four times the size of the five-story pagoda of Hōryū-ji, surpassing other Asuka temples and even the seven-story pagoda of Tōdai-ji in the Nara period. It is comparable to the foundation of the nine-story pagoda of Daikandai-ji. No foundation stones remain on the top of the foundation platform, but a huge hole where the central core stone was located has been found in the center of the foundation. The pagoda is assumed to be a nine-story structure.

The foundations of the Middle Gate have also been discovered. The gate was off center from the central axis of the temple, suggesting that the Main Hall and Pagoda had separate Middle Gates; however, the site of a Middle Gate for the Pagoda has not been found. Three foundations believed to have been the dormitories of monks have been found, two to north of the Main Hall and one to the west. Other dormitories are believed to have existed. No foundations for a Lecture Hall or a South Gate have yet been discovered.

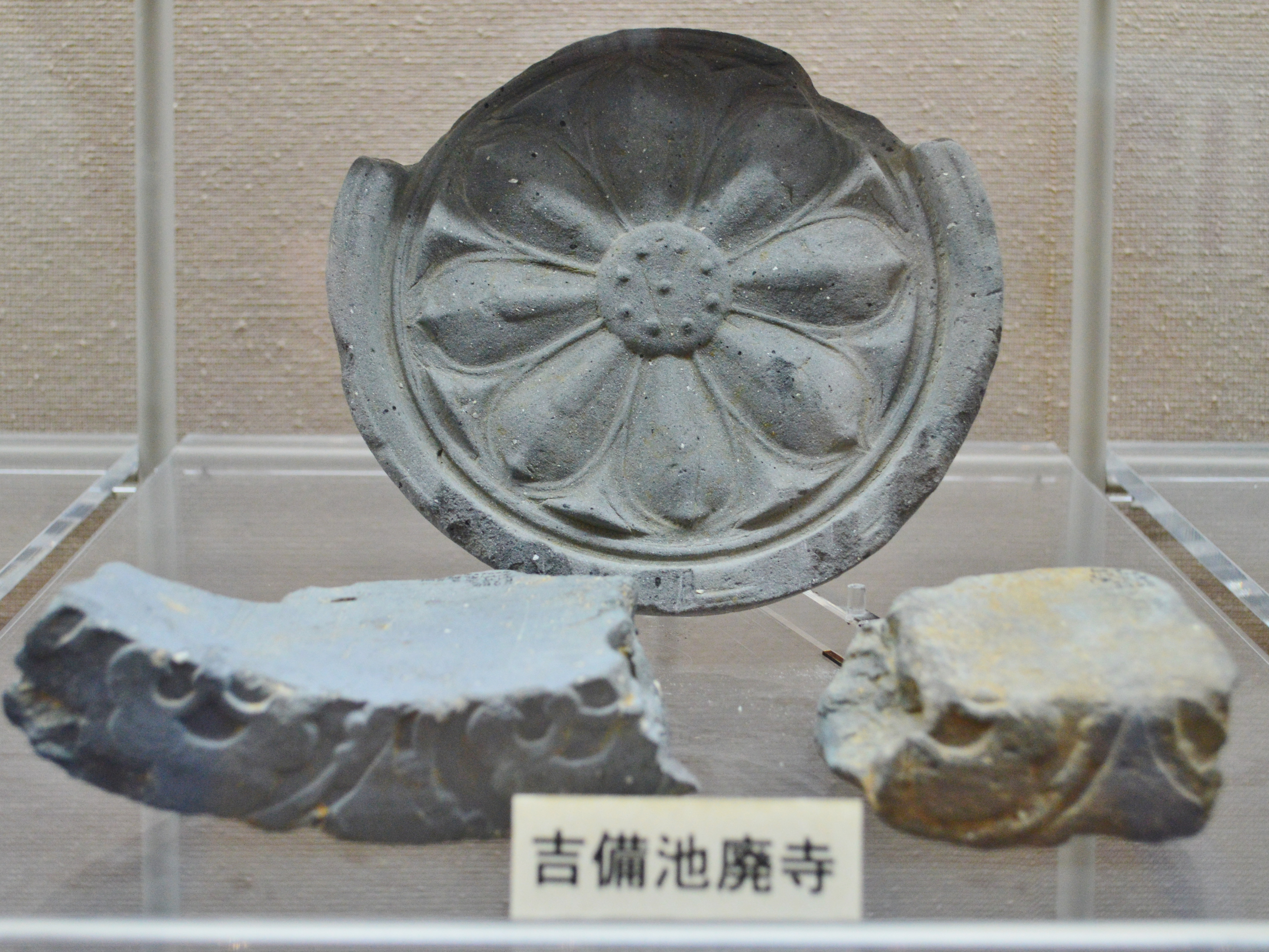
Roof tiles from Kibi-ike site

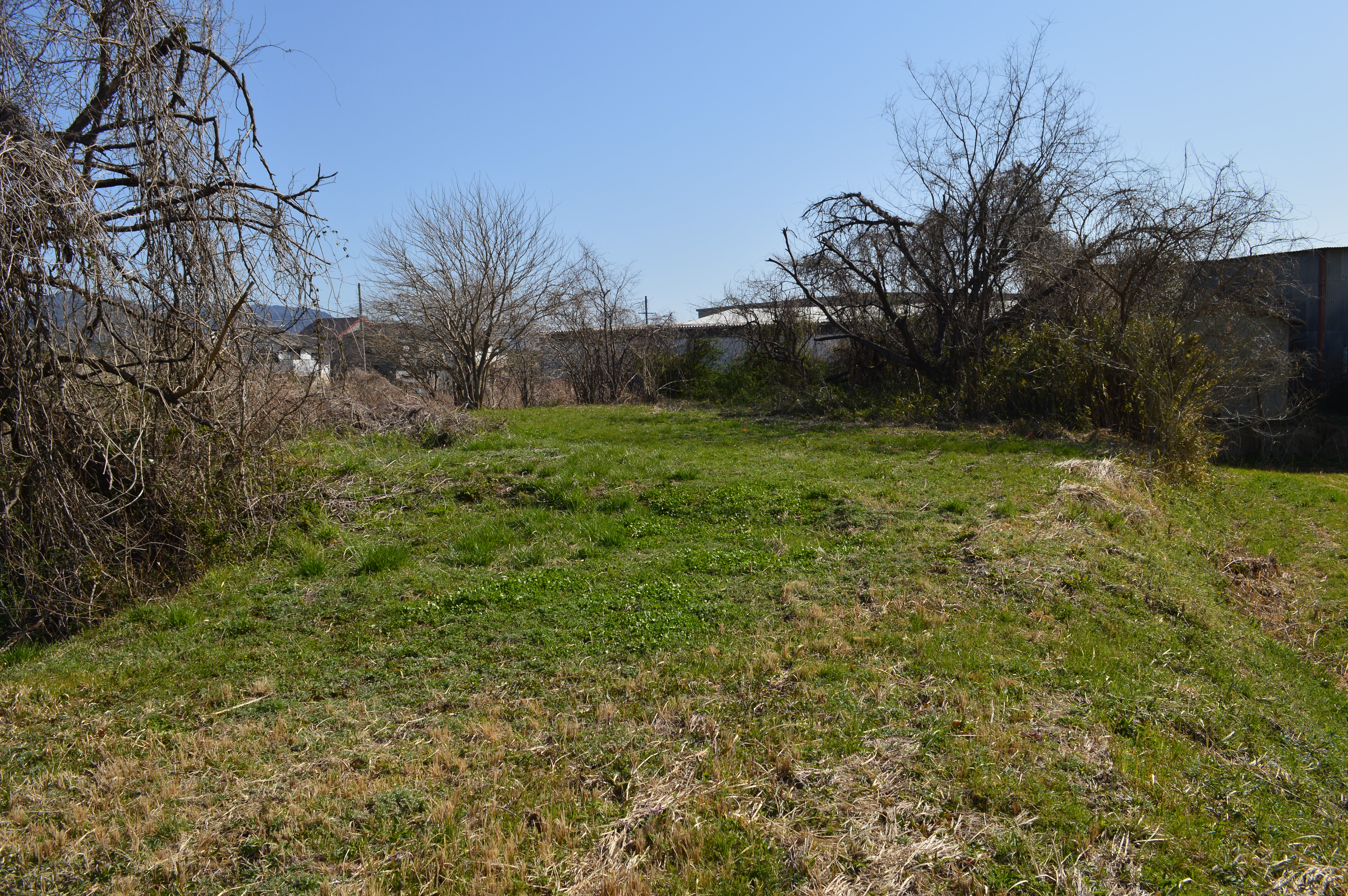
Site of the Main Hall

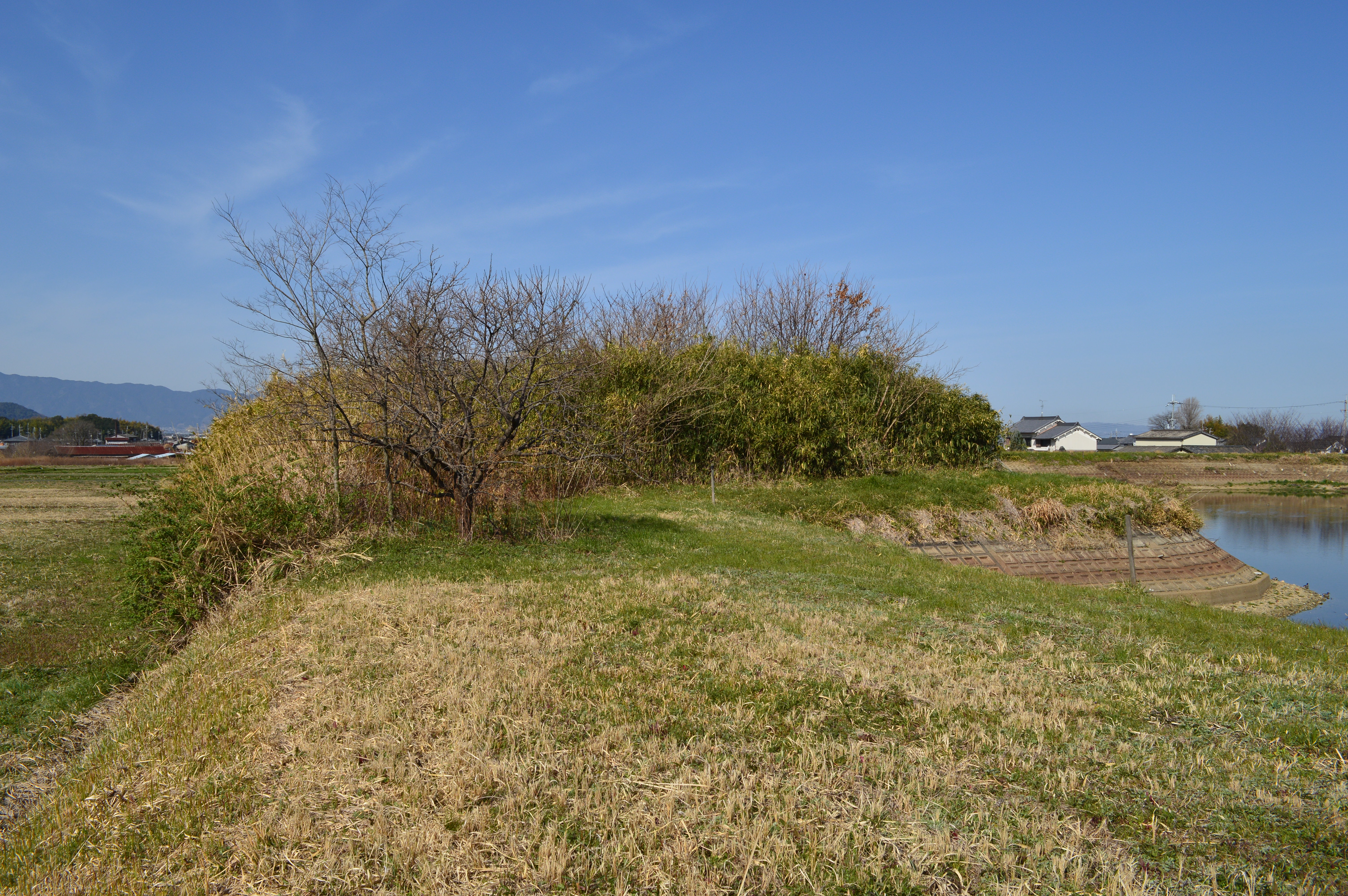
Site of the pagoda

At the Kibi-iki site, only a small number of roof tiles have been found, four types of round roof tiles and three types of flat roof tiles, but most of the excavated tiles were single-petal eight-petal lotus roof tiles and flat roof tiles with embossed honeysuckle arabesque design from the temple's founding. As no replacement roof tiles were found and only a small number of tiles from the temple's founding period have been excavated, it is certain that the building was moved to another location.The round eaves tiles from the founding period preceded those of the Main Hall of Yamada-dera (construction began in 643), while the flat eaves tiles are later than the Wakakusa compound of Hōryū-ji, which means that the temple had to have been built in the 630s to early 640s. After its relocation, the site was incorporated into the grid pattern of streets in Fujiwara-kyō, and after the relocation of the capital to Heijō-kyō, the area became paddy fields.

The Kibi-ike temple ruins are about 2.3 kilometers southwest from Sakurai Station on the Kintetsu Railway and JR West.

== See also ==
- List of Historic Sites of Japan (Nara)
