= Oka-dera =

- 岡寺
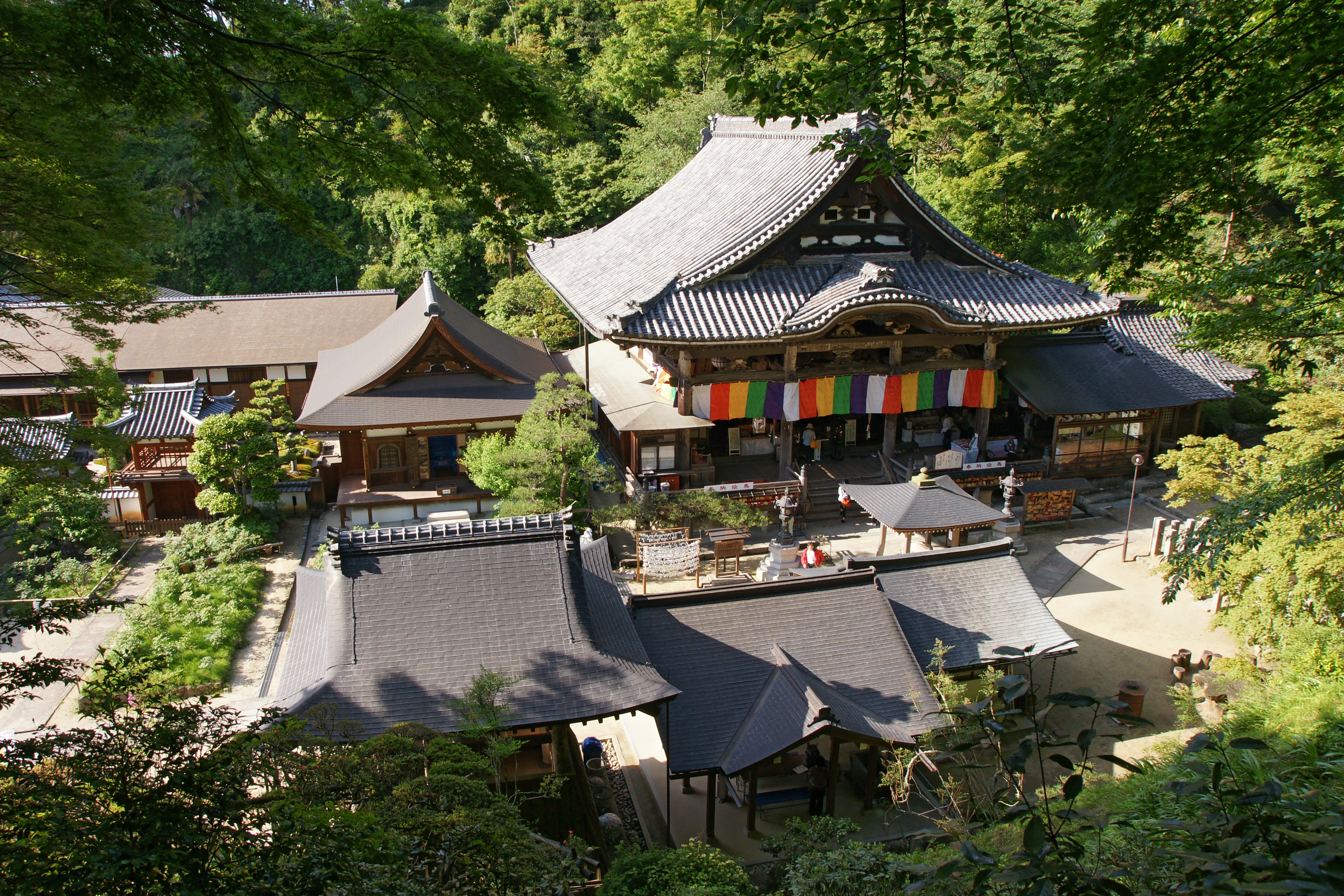
- Oka-dera

- Location within Nara Prefecture Location within Japan

Religion
- Affiliation: Buddhist
- Deity: Nyōirin Kannon
- Rite: Shingon-shu Buzan-ha
- Status: functional

Location
- Location: 806 Oka, Asuka-mura, Takaichi-gun, Nara-ken
- Country: Japan
- Interactive map of Oka-dera
- Coordinates: 34°28′18.44″N 135°49′42.14″E

Architecture
- Founder: c.Gien
- Completed: c.689

Website
- Official website
- National Important Cultural Property National Historic Site

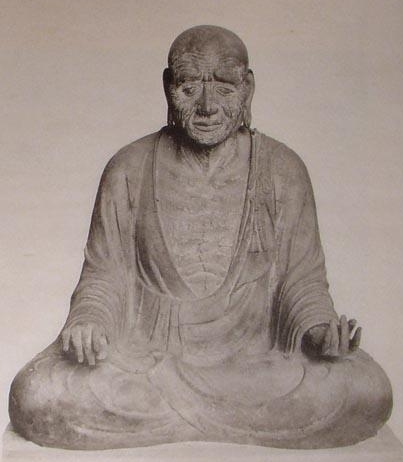
Statue of Gien, the temple's founder

Oka-dera (岡寺) is a Buddhist temple located in the Oka neighborhood of the village of Asuka, Nara Prefecture, Japan. It belongs to the Shingon-shū Buzan-ha sect and its honzon is a clay statue of Nyōirin Kannon Bosatsu. The temple's full name is Tōkō-zan Shinjūin-in Ryūgai-ji (東光山 真珠院 龍蓋寺). The temple is the 7th stop on the Saigoku Kannon Pilgrimage pilgrimage route.

== Overview ==
The foundation of this temple is uncertain. According to the "Gien-den" in the "Tōdaiji Yoroku" and the "Fusō Ryakuki", the temple was founded when the monk Gien (643-728) built a building on the site of the Okamiya Palace, the residence of Prince Kusakabe, the son of Emperor Tenmu who died in 689. According to the temple's legend, Gien sealed an evil dragon which had been tormenting the local residences in a pond and covered it with stones. This led the temple to become famous as a place for prayers to ward off evil, and it attracted numerous pilgrims from the Heian period onwards, and to the temple' formal name of Ryūgai-ji (龍蓋寺; "Dragon Lid Temple"). However, the first appearance of the temple in historical documentation is in an entry in the "Shōsōin Documents" in July 740.

The current temple is located on a hillside east of Asuka Village, and so the temple was nicknamed "Oka-dera"; however, roof tiles dating to the early Nara period have been excavated from the grounds of Haruta Shrine, adjacent to the west of the temple, and it is believed that this was the site of the temple when first constructed. The former site of Okadera was designated a National Historic Site in 2005. In 1982, an excavation by the Kashihara Archaeological Institute revealed that a 4.5meter-long line of tuff cut stones, thought to have marked the north side of a south-facing main hall measuring 7 bays (approximately 12.74 meters) by 4 bays (7.28 meters). The layout of other buildings and the temple complex is unknown.

Gien was the founder of the Hosso sect, and his disciples included Rōben and Gyōki, who were involved in the founding of Tōdai-ji. Oka-dera was a branch temple of Kofuku-ji, but gradually fell into decline. In the Edo period, it was restored by Hase-dera and converted into a Shingon temple.

The Main Hall of the temple was rebuilt in 1805 and is a Designated Tangible Cultural Property of Nara Prefecture. The Kaisan-dō (Founder's Chapel) dates from 1797 and was relocated to Oka-dera in 1871 from Myōraku-ji (Tanzan Shrine) due to the Meiji government's edicts separating Buddhism from Shinto. The Rōmon gate is also a Nara Prefecture Designated Tangible Cultural Property. It was built in the Keichō era (1596-1615) using materials from the three-story pagoda, which was started to be rebuilt in 1473 but never completed. The Niōmon gate is a National Important Cultural Property and was built in 1612, also from materials from the former three-story pagoda.

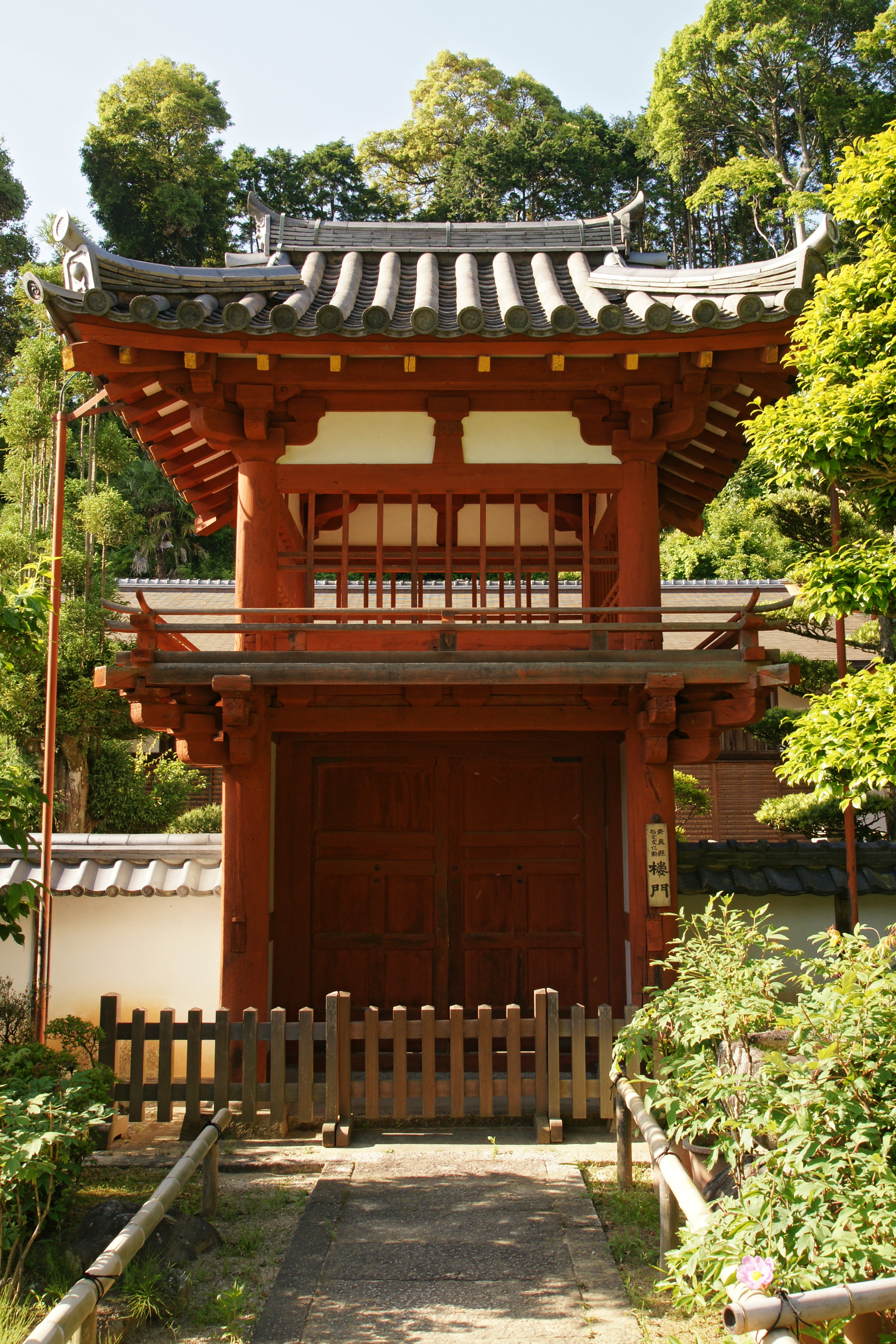
Rōmon

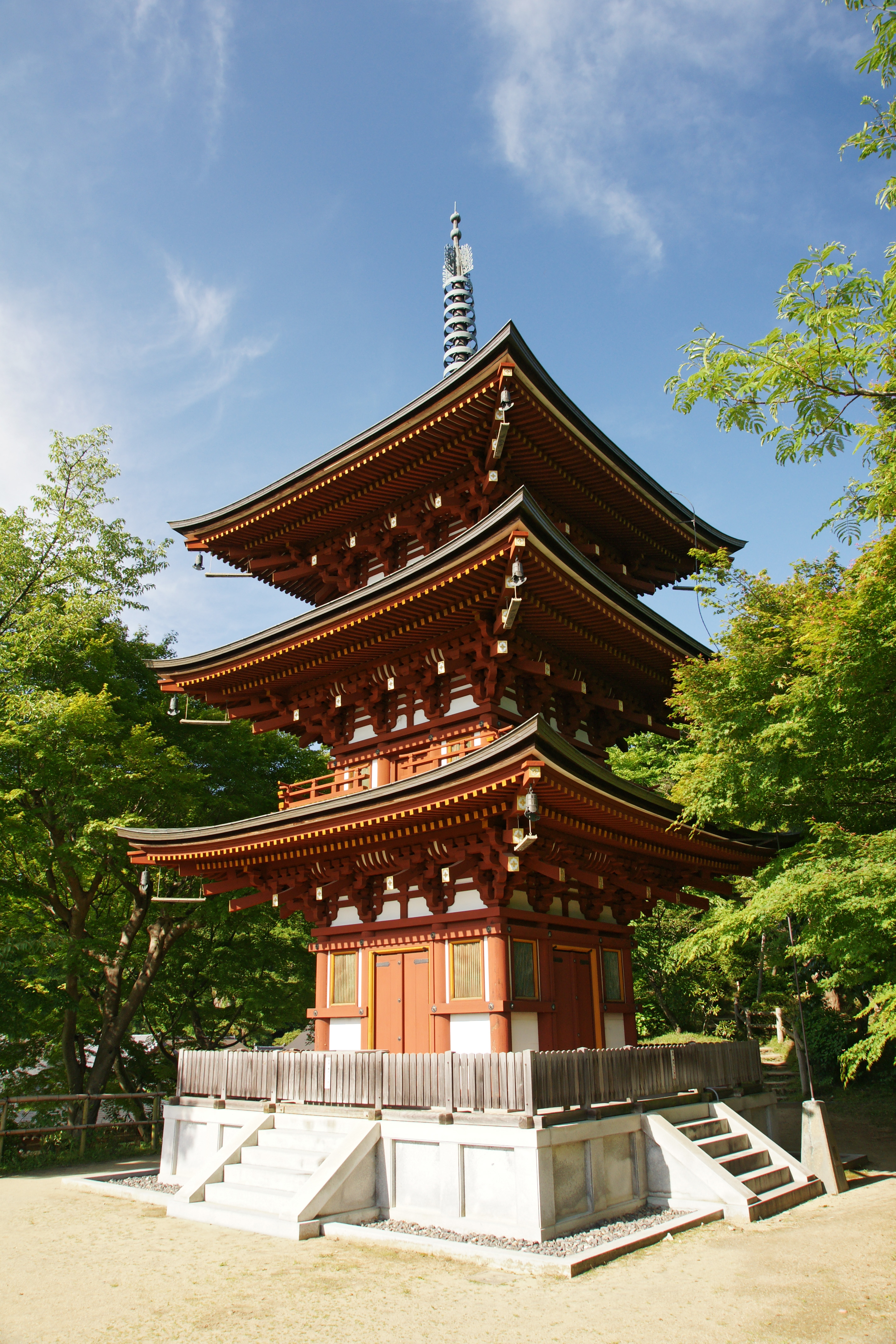
Three-story Pagoda

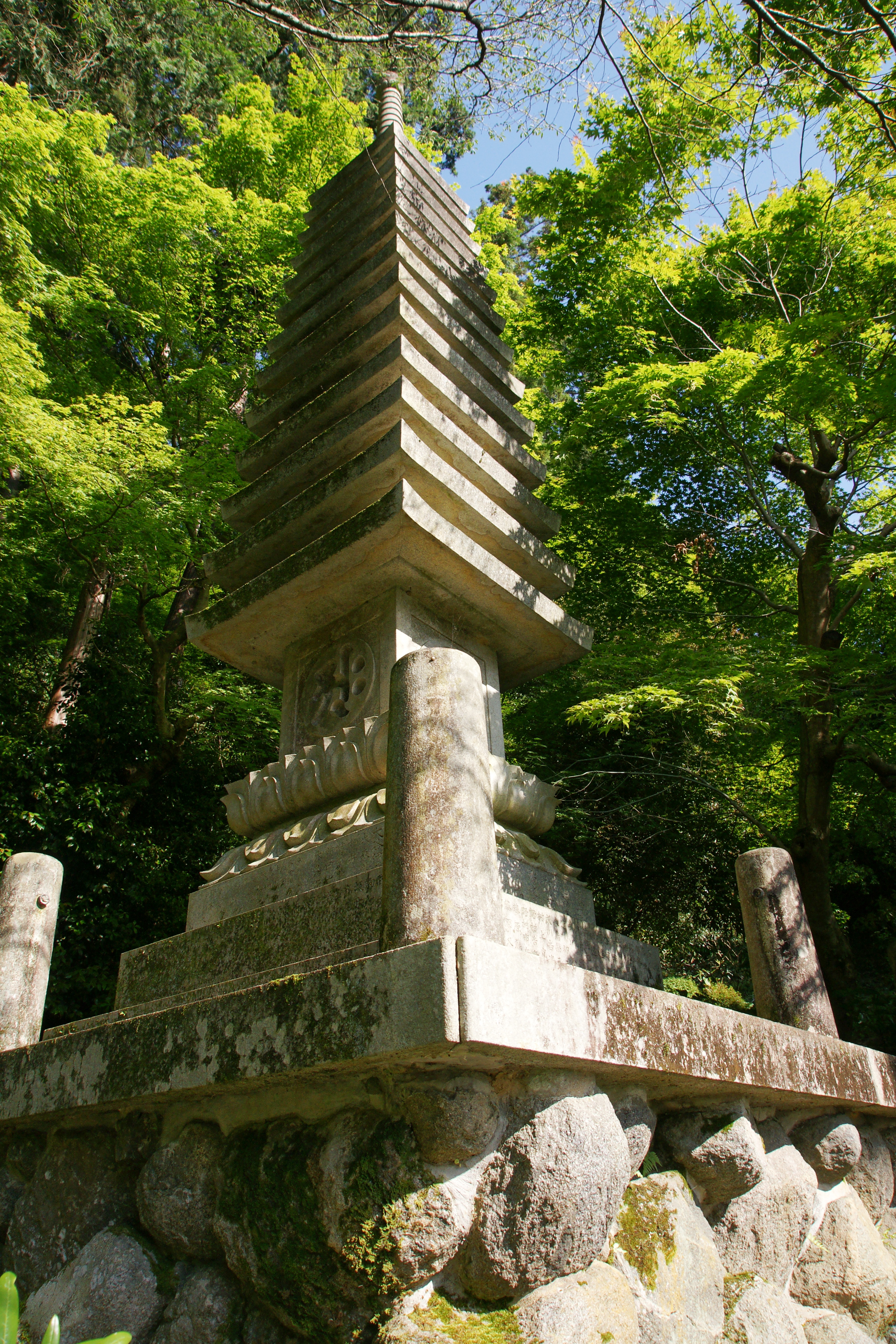
Stone 12-story Pagoda

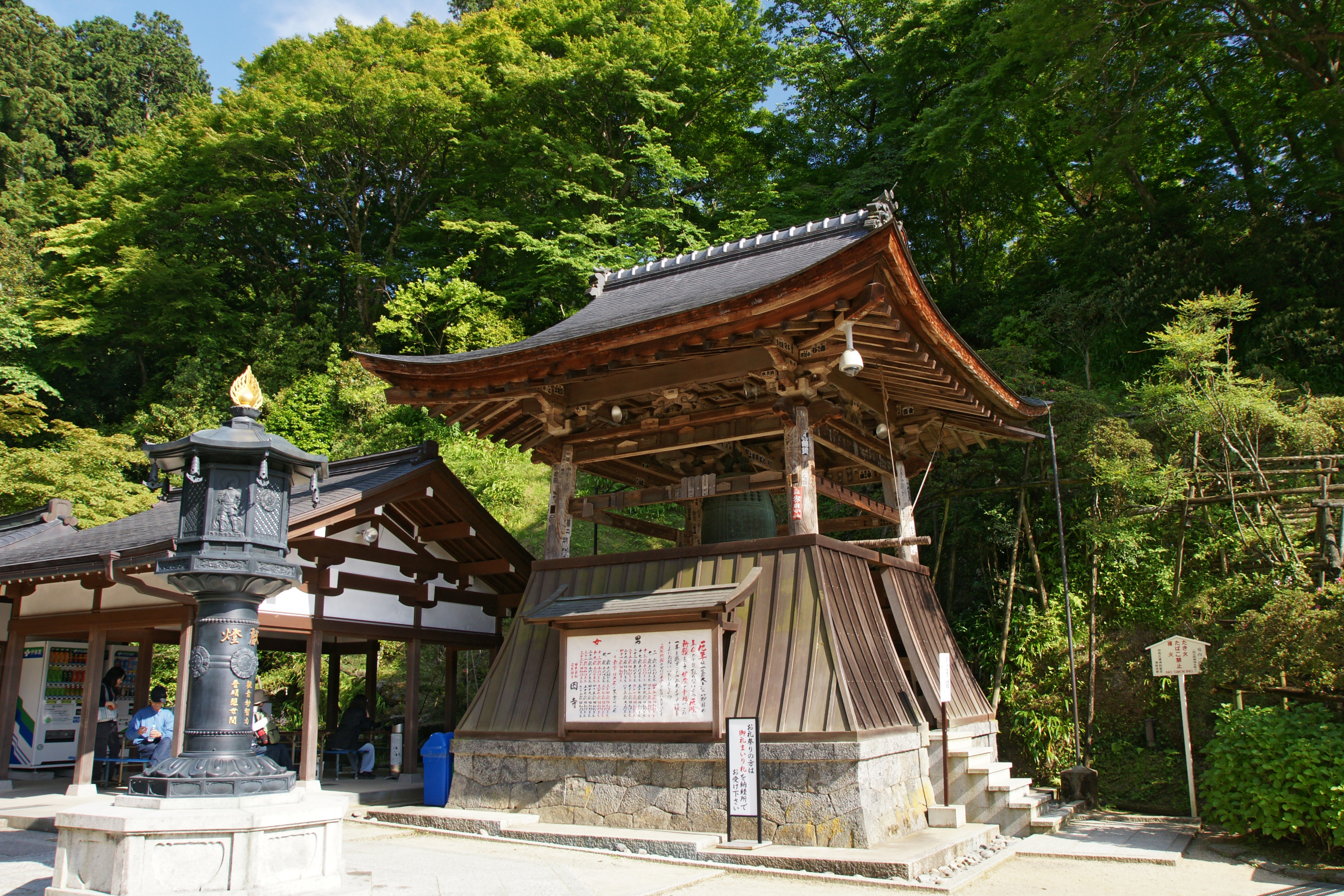
Shōrō

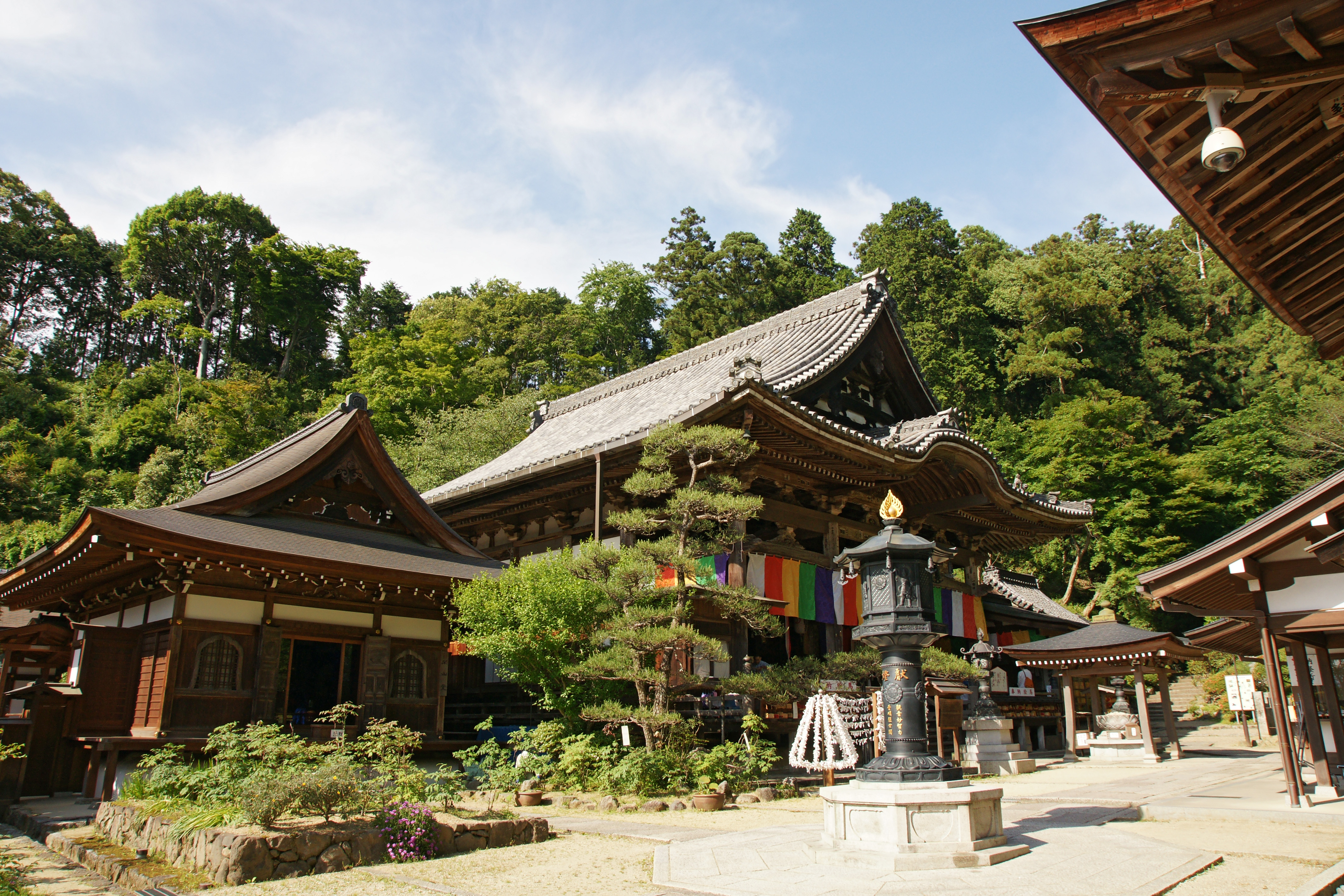
Main Hall

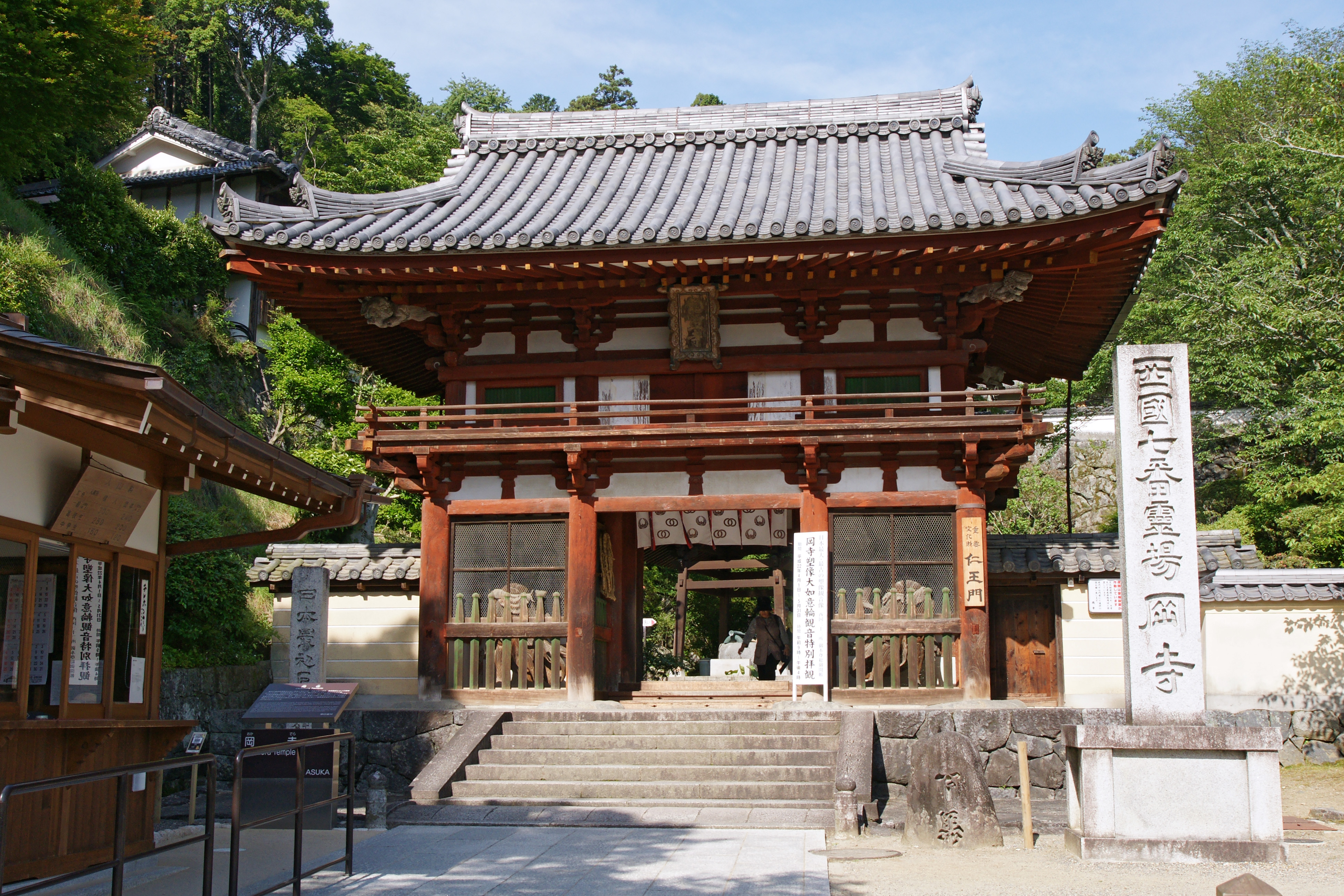
Niōmon

== Cultural Properties ==
=== National Treasure ===
- Wooden dry lacquer portrait statue of Gien (木心乾漆義淵僧正坐像), Nara period

=== National Important Cultural Properties ===
- Niōmon (仁王門), Edo period (1612), from materials from the former three-story pagoda.
- Shoin (書院), Edo period (1644)
- Clay statue of seated Nyōirin Kannon (塑造如意輪観音坐像), Nara period. It is the largest clay statue in Japan, standing 4.85 meters tall. Most Nyoirin Kannon statues are depicted as six-armed seated figures, but this statue has two arms, similar to the principal image at Ishiyama-dera. The head is original, but the body has been extensively repaired, and the legs were originally half-seated like the principal image at Ishiyama-dera but were altered to the current seated form.
- Clay celestial figure plaque (天人文甎), Nara period

=== Nara Prefecture Designated Tangible Cultural Properties ===
- Hondō (本堂), Edo period (1612)
- Rōmon (楼門), Azuchi-Momoyama period (1596-1615)

== See also ==
- List of National Treasures of Japan (sculptures)
- List of Historic Sites of Japan (Nara)
