= Uda Mikumari Shrine =

Shinto shrine in Uda, Nara, Japan

Uda Mikumari-jinja 宇太水分神社
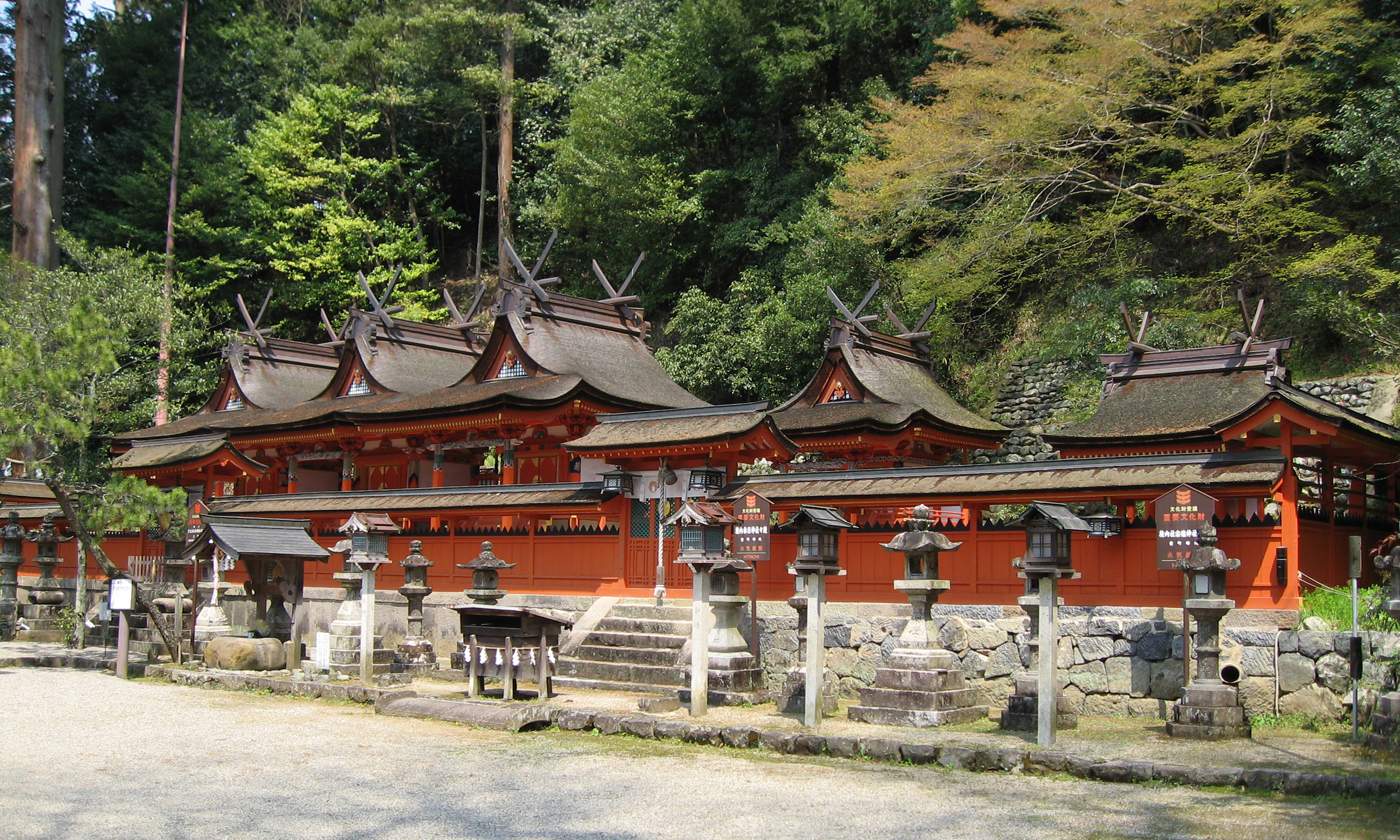
- The honden, composed of three conjoined Kasuga-style buildings.

- Location within Japan

Religion
- Affiliation: Shinto
- Deity: Ame-no-mikumari-no-kami; Hayaakitsuhiko; Kuni-no-mikumari-no-kami
- Leadership: Miyake Mizuhiko

Location
- Location: 244-3, Utano-ken, Uda, Nara; 922-8225
- Coordinates: 34°28′29″N 135°58′14″E

Architecture
- Established: 1320

Website
- www1.odn.ne.jp/udanomikumari/

Uda Mikumari Shrine (宇太水分神社, Uda Mikumari-jinja) is a Shinto shrine located in Uda, Nara, Japan. It is dedicated to mikumari, a female Shinto kami associated with water. The honden was built near the end of the Kamakura period, and is listed as a National Treasure of Japan.
