= Kakuan-ji =

Buddhist temple in Japan

Kakuan-ji 額安寺
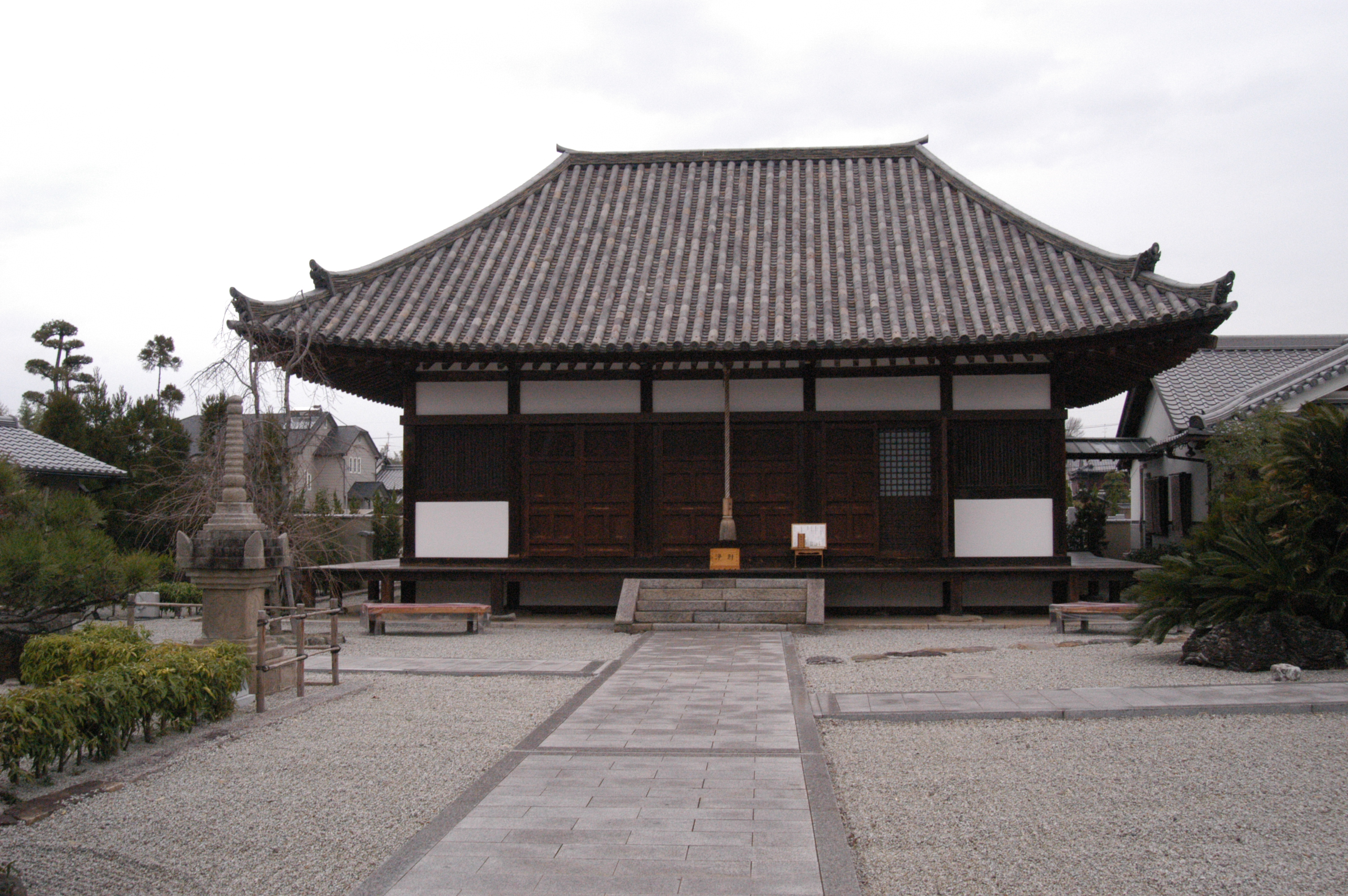

Religion
- Affiliation: Shingon Ritsu
- Deity: Jūichimen Kannon (Eleven-faced Avalokiteśvara)

Location
- Location: 36 Nukatabeteramachi, Yamatokoriyama, Nara Prefecture
- Country: Japan
- Interactive map of Kakuan-ji 額安寺
- Coordinates: 34°36′2.9″N 135°46′19.8″E

Kakuan-ji (額安寺) is a Buddhist temple in Yamatokōriyama, Nara Prefecture, Japan. It is affiliated with Shingon Risshu Buddhism, and was founded in 621.

== See also ==
- Historical Sites of Prince Shōtoku
