= Tainose Station =

Railway station in Wakayama, Wakayama Prefecture, Japan

Tainose Station 田井ノ瀬駅
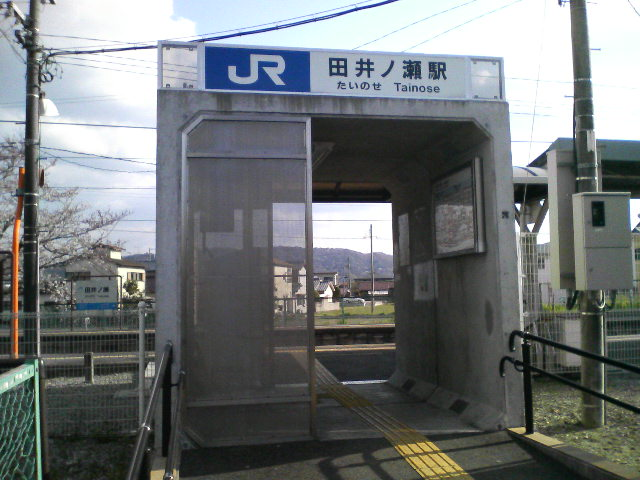
- Tainose Station entrance, April 2009

General information
- Location: 667-5 Iwase, Wakayama-shi, Wakayama-ken 640-8301; Japan
- Coordinates: 34.2419°N 135.2296°E
- Owner: West Japan Railway Company
- Operator: West Japan Railway Company
- Line: T Wakayama Line
- Distance: 82.9 km (51.5 miles) from Ōji
- Platforms: 2 side platforms
- Tracks: 2
- Train operators: West Japan Railway Company

Other information
- Status: Unstaffed
- Website: Official website

History
- Opened: 4 May 1898
- Former names: Iwase (to 1899)

Passengers
- FY2019: 330 daily
Services
Preceding station	JR-West	Following station
Wakayama Line
Rapid Service: Does not stop at this station
Iwade	Local	Kii-Ogura
Location
- Location within Wakayama Prefecture Location within Japan

Tainose Station (田井ノ瀬駅, Tainose-eki) is a passenger railway station in located in the city of Wakayama, Wakayama Prefecture, Japan, operated by West Japan Railway Company (JR West).

== Lines ==
Tainose Station is served by the Wakayama Line, and is located 82.9 kilometers from the terminus of the line at Ōji Station.

== Station layout ==
The station consists of two opposed side platforms connected by an open footbridge. The station is unattended.

=== Platforms ===
1	■ T Wakayama Line	for Kokawa and Hashimoto
2	■ T Wakayama Line	for Wakayama

== Adjacent stations ==
«	Service	»
Wakayama Line
Rapid Service: Does not stop at this station
Senda	Local	Wakayama

== History ==
Tainose Station opened on May 4,1898 as Iwase Station (岩橋駅) on the Kiwa Railway. It was renamed to its present name on January 15, 1899.The line was sold to the Kansai Railway in 1904, which was subsequently nationalized in 1907. With the privatization of the Japan National Railways (JNR) on April 1, 1987, the station came under the aegis of the West Japan Railway Company.

== Passenger statistics ==
In fiscal 2019, the station was used by an average of 330 passengers daily (boarding passengers only).

== Surrounding Area ==
- Wakayama City Nishiwasa Elementary School

== See also ==
- List of railway stations in Japan
