= Nishi Kokubun pagoda site =

Historic religious ruin in Iwade, Wakayama, Japan

Nishi-Kokubun pagoda site
- 西国分塔跡 (Japanese)
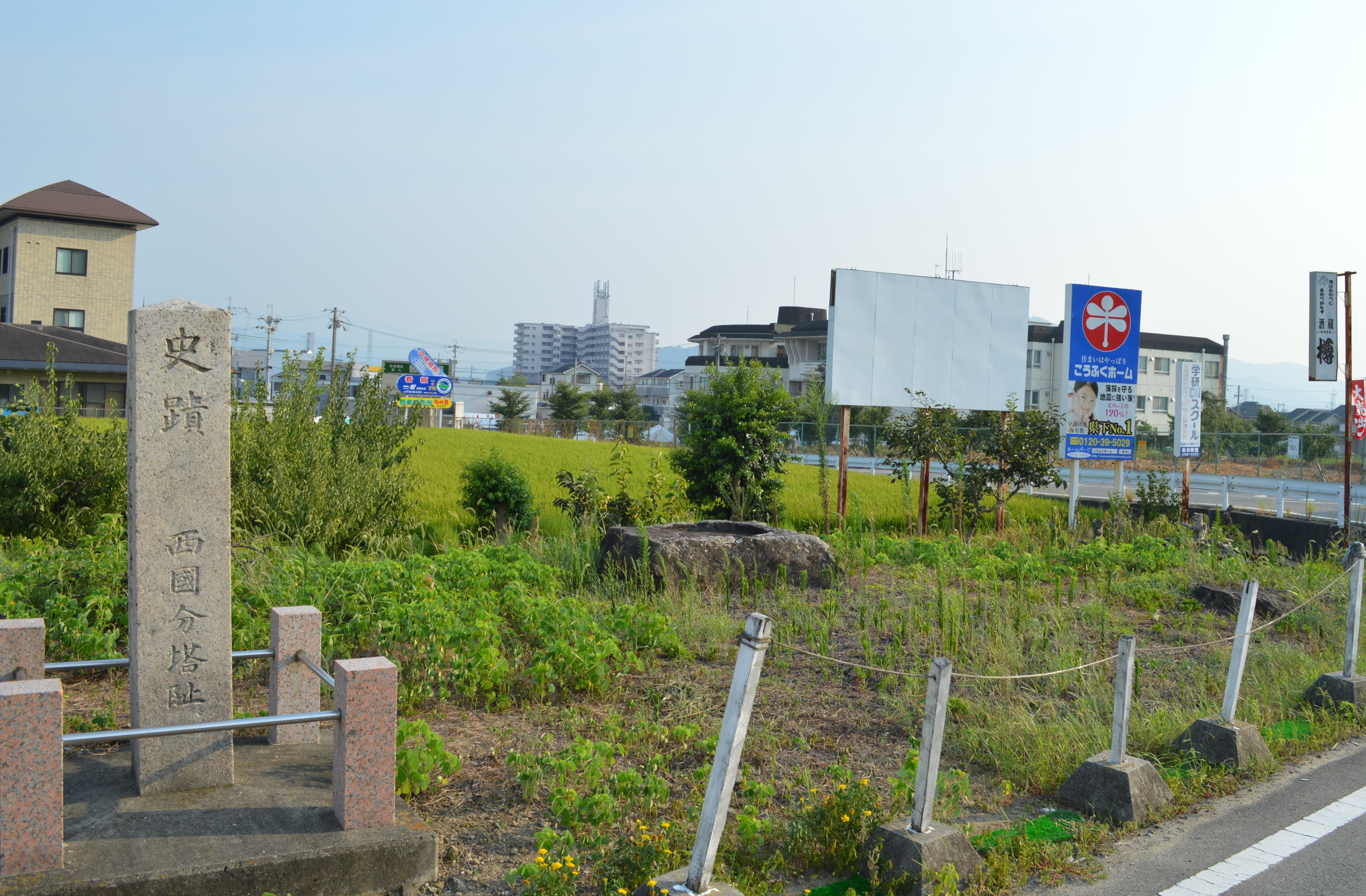
- Site of Nishi-Kokubun temple ruins

- Location within Wakayama Prefecture Location within Japan
- 34°15′57″N 135°19′53″E
- Type: Buddhist temple ruins
- Location: Iwade, Wakayama, Japan

History
- Founder: Emperor Shōmu
- National Historic Site of Japan

The Nishi-Kokubun site (西国分塔跡, Nishi-Kokubun tō ato) is an archaeological site with the ruins of a Buddhist temple located in what is now the Nishikokubu neighborhood of the city of Iwade, Wakayama, Japan. The temple is now in ruins with almost no traces remaining, and even the name of the temple is unknown, but it is believed to have been one of the provincial nunneriess per the system established by Emperor Shōmu during the Nara period (710 – 794) for the purpose of promoting Buddhism as the national religion of Japan and standardising imperial rule over the provinces. The foundation stones for the pagoda were designated as a National Historic Site in 1928, with the area under designation adjusted in 1985.

== Overview ==
The Shoku Nihongi records that in 741 AD, as the country recovered from a major smallpox epidemic, Emperor Shōmu ordered that a state-subsidized monastery and nunnery be established in every province for the promotion of Buddhism and to enhance political unification per the new ritsuryō system. These were the kokubunji (国分寺). The temples were constructed per a more-or-less standardized template, and were each to be staffed by twenty clerics who would pray for the state's protection. The associated provincial nunneries (kokubunniji) were on a smaller scale, each housing ten nuns to pray for the atonement of sins. This system declined when the capital was moved from Nara to Kyoto in 794 AD.

== History ==
The Nishi-Kokubun site is located at the tip of a river terrace on the right bank of the lower Kinokawa River, and 700 meters to the east is the ruins of Kii Kokubun-ji temple. It is believed to have been a monastery founded in the Hakuhō period (673-686), which was later converted into a nunnery in the Tenpyō period (729-749). The site occupies a rectangular precinct that a long from north-to-south and shorter from east-to-west, but the exact layout of the buildings is unknown. The foundations of the pagoda consist of four foundation stones, each one meter by 0.7 meters on a bed of rammed earth, with a stone in the middle with a hole for the central pillar of the pagoda. This central stone measures 1.8 meters by 1.2 meters. It is estimated that the tower measured 3.8 meters on each side. Numerous roof tile shards have been found, some with a single-lobe lotus motif as per Yamada-dera, and others with a double lotus motif as per Kawahara-dera. Similar roof tiles have been excavated from the Ueno temple ruins, eight kilometers to the west.

The history of the temple remains unknown. The site is a short walk from the "Higashi Koen-mae" bus stop on the community bus from Iwade Station on the JR West Wakayama Line.

== See also ==
- List of Historic Sites of Japan (Wakayama)
- provincial temple
