= Kii Kokubun-ji =

Buddhist temple in Japan

Coordinates: 34°16′08″N 135°20′22″E

Kii Kokubun-ji 紀伊国分寺
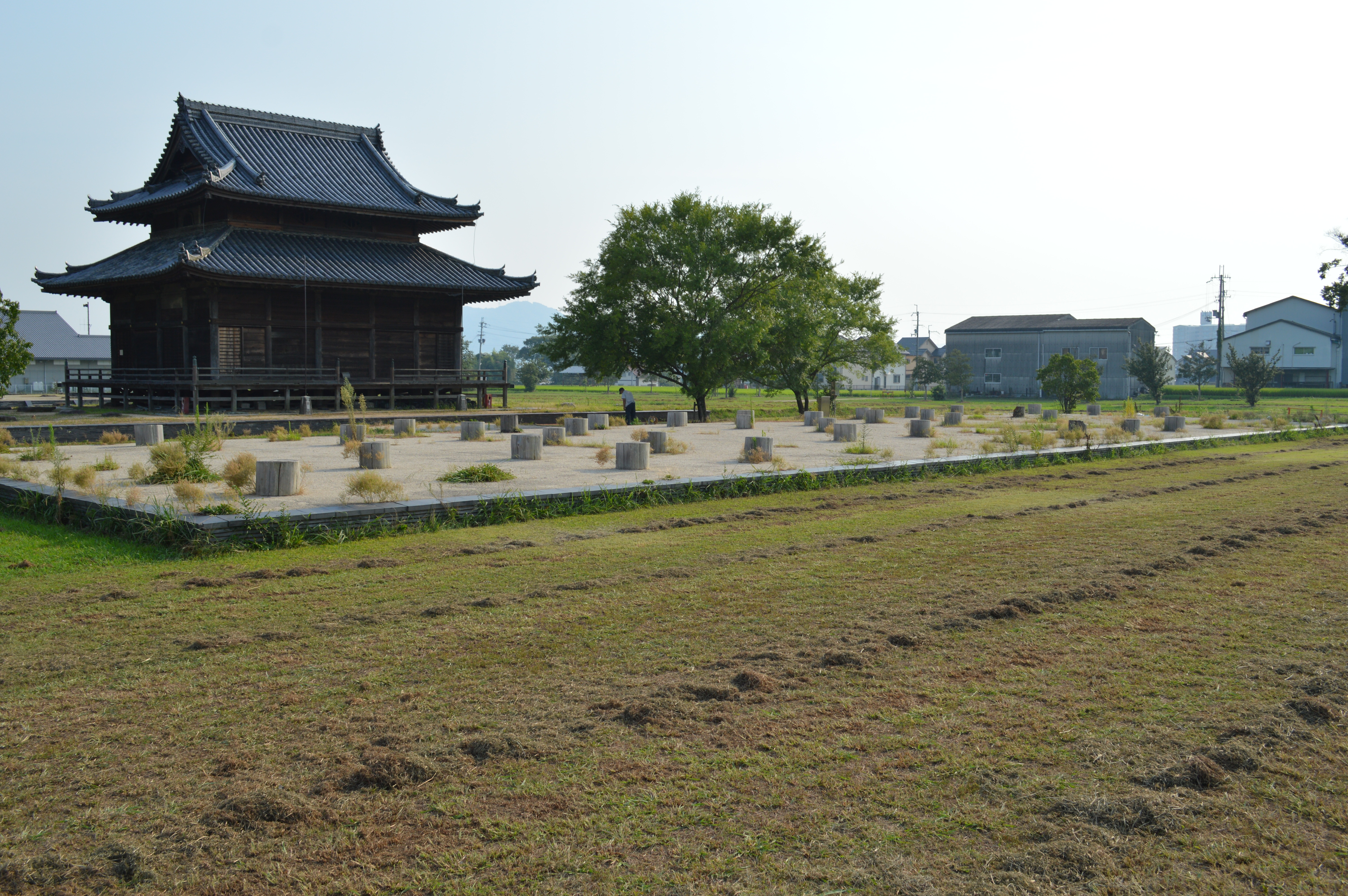
- Kii Kokubun-ji

- Kii Kokubun-ji Kii Kokubun-ji (Japan)

Religion
- Affiliation: Buddhist
- Deity: Yakushi Nyōrai
- Rite: Shingi-Shingon-shu
- Status: functioning

Location
- Location: 671 Higashikokubu, Kinokawa-shi, Wakayama-ken 649-6428
- Country: Japan
- Interactive map of Kii Kokubun-ji 紀伊国分寺

Architecture
- Founder: Emperor Shōmu
- Completed: c.756

The Kii Kokubun-ji (紀伊国分寺) is a Buddhist temple located in the Higashikokubu neighborhood of the city of Kinokawa, Wakayama, Japan. It was one of the provincial temples per the system established by Emperor Shōmu during the Nara period (710 – 794) for the purpose of promoting Buddhism as the national religion of Japan and standardising imperial rule over the provinces. The modern temple belongs to the Shingi Shingon sect and its main image is a statue of Yakushi Nyōrai.

Part of the temple grounds were designated as a National Historic Site in 1928 with the area under protection expanded in 1988.

== Overview ==
The Shoku Nihongi records that in 741 AD, as the country recovered from a major smallpox epidemic, Emperor Shōmu ordered that a state-subsidized monastery and nunnery be established in every province for the promotion of Buddhism and to enhance political unification per the new ritsuryō system. These were the kokubunji (国分寺). The temples were constructed per a more-or-less standardized template, and were each to be staffed by twenty clerics who would pray for the state's protection. The associated provincial nunneries (kokubunniji) were on a smaller scale, each housing ten nuns to pray for the atonement of sins. This system declined when the capital was moved from Nara to Kyoto in 794 AD.

== History ==
The Kii Kokubun-ji is located at the southern end of the river terrace formed on the north bank of the lower reaches of the Kinokawa River. It is believed to have been one of the original provincial temples authorized by Emperor Shomu in 741, but there is no documentary evidence of its construction or layout. The temple is mentioned in an entry in the Shoku Nihongi dated 756, so it much have been competed by that time. As built, the temple occupied a 218-meter square enclosure, centered on the Lecture Hall.

Per the Kii Kuni Kinkomyoji (紀伊国金光明寺), the temple was completely destroyed by a fire in 879, as only the Main Hall and monk's quarters were rebuilt. The temple appears in the early Heian period Engishiki records, but then disappears again from historical records until the beginning of the 14th century, when the Main Hall was rebuilt on the foundations of the original Lecture Hall. The temple subsequently became a subsidiary of Negoro-ji and was destroyed again during Toyotomi Hideyoshi’s conquest of Kii province in 1585. Under the sponsorship of Kishū Domain in the Edo period, the temple's current Main Hall was reconstructed in 1700. It is a five by four bay structure with a tile roof and appears to be a two-story structure from the outside but is single-story inside. This building was relocated to the foundations of the Nara-period Lecture Hall in 1992. It is a Kinokawa city tangible cultural property.

In 1928, the foundations of the Japanese pagoda were designated a National Historic Site. This foundation is made of chlorite schist stones, 16.4 meters on each side, and the shards of numerous roof tiles have been found in the vicinity. From its size, it is estimated that the original pagoda was a seven-story structure. Archaeological excavations from 1973 have found the foundations of many of the original structures, which were arranged in a straight line with a South Gate, Middle Gate, Main Hall, Lecture Hall and Monk's quarters. The pagoda was in between the Main Hall and the Middle Gate, but offset to the east of the central axis. In the corresponding position to the west of the central axis was a pond and garden. A cloister extended from the sides of the Central Gate to the Lecture Hall surrounding the Main Hall, Pagoda, Bell Tower and Kyōzō.

The ruins have been opened to the public as an archaeological park and are about a 15-minute walk from Shimo-Isaka Station on the JR West Wakayama Line.

== Gallery ==
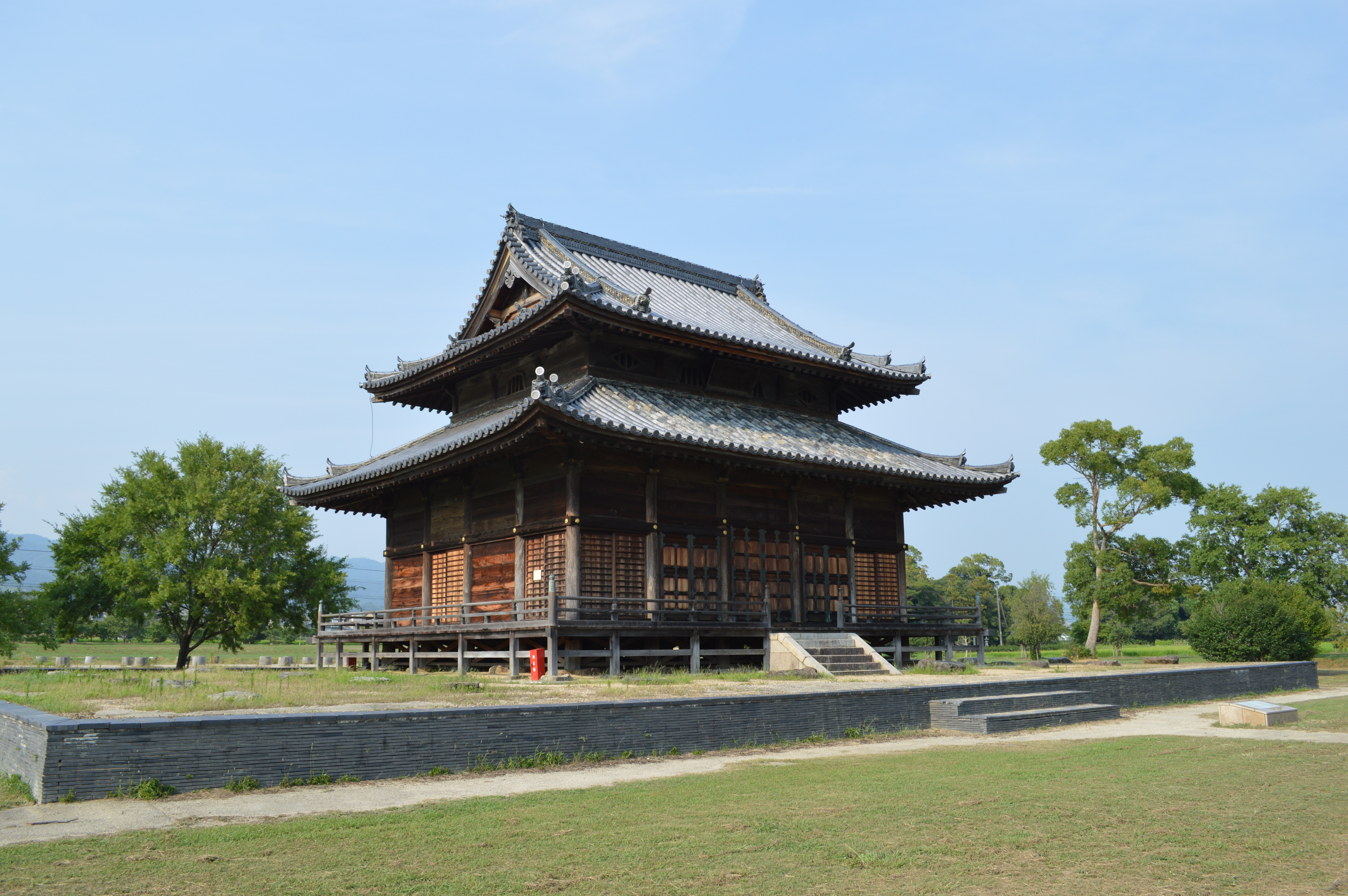
Hondo

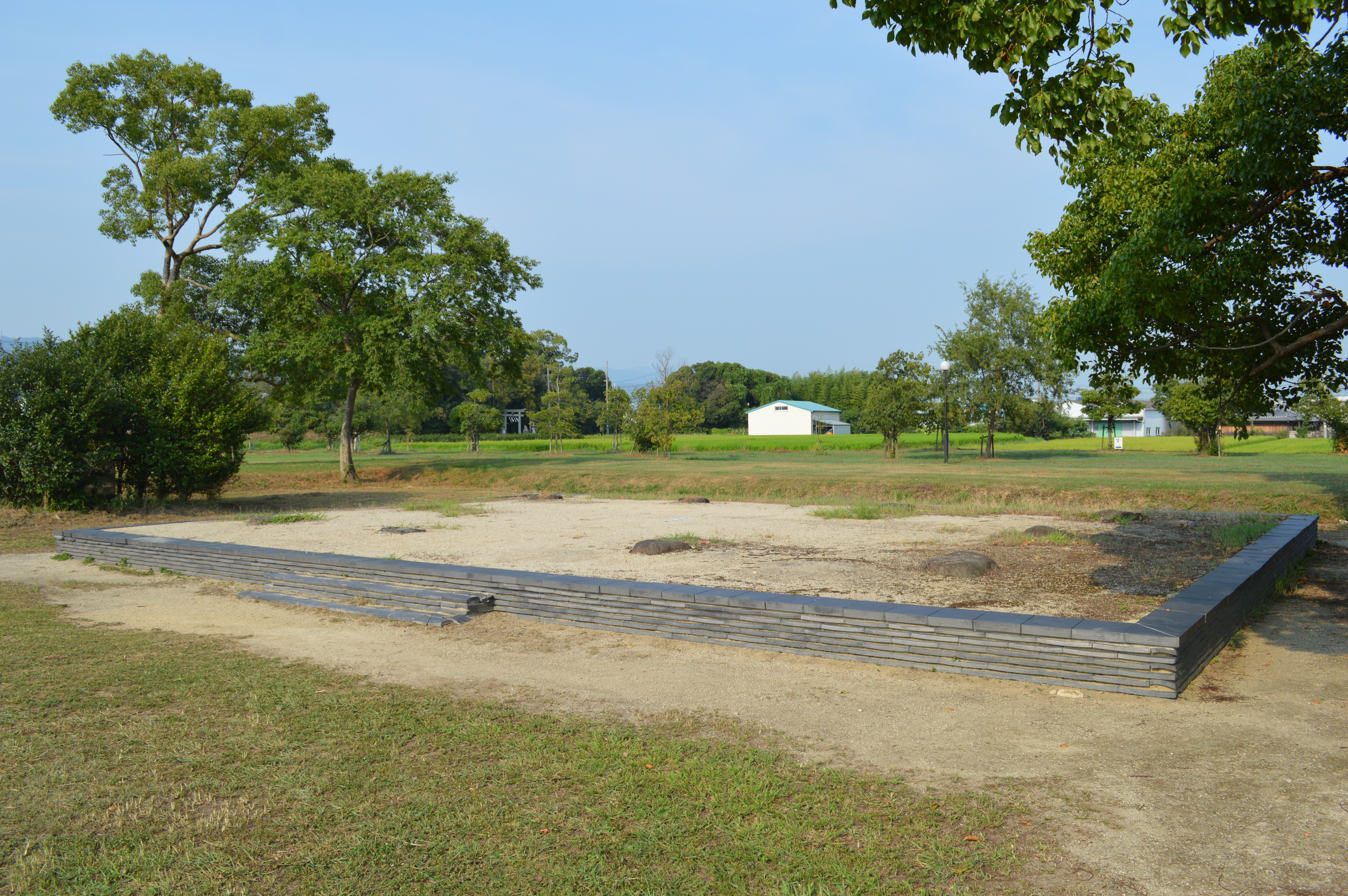
Ruins of the Kyōzō

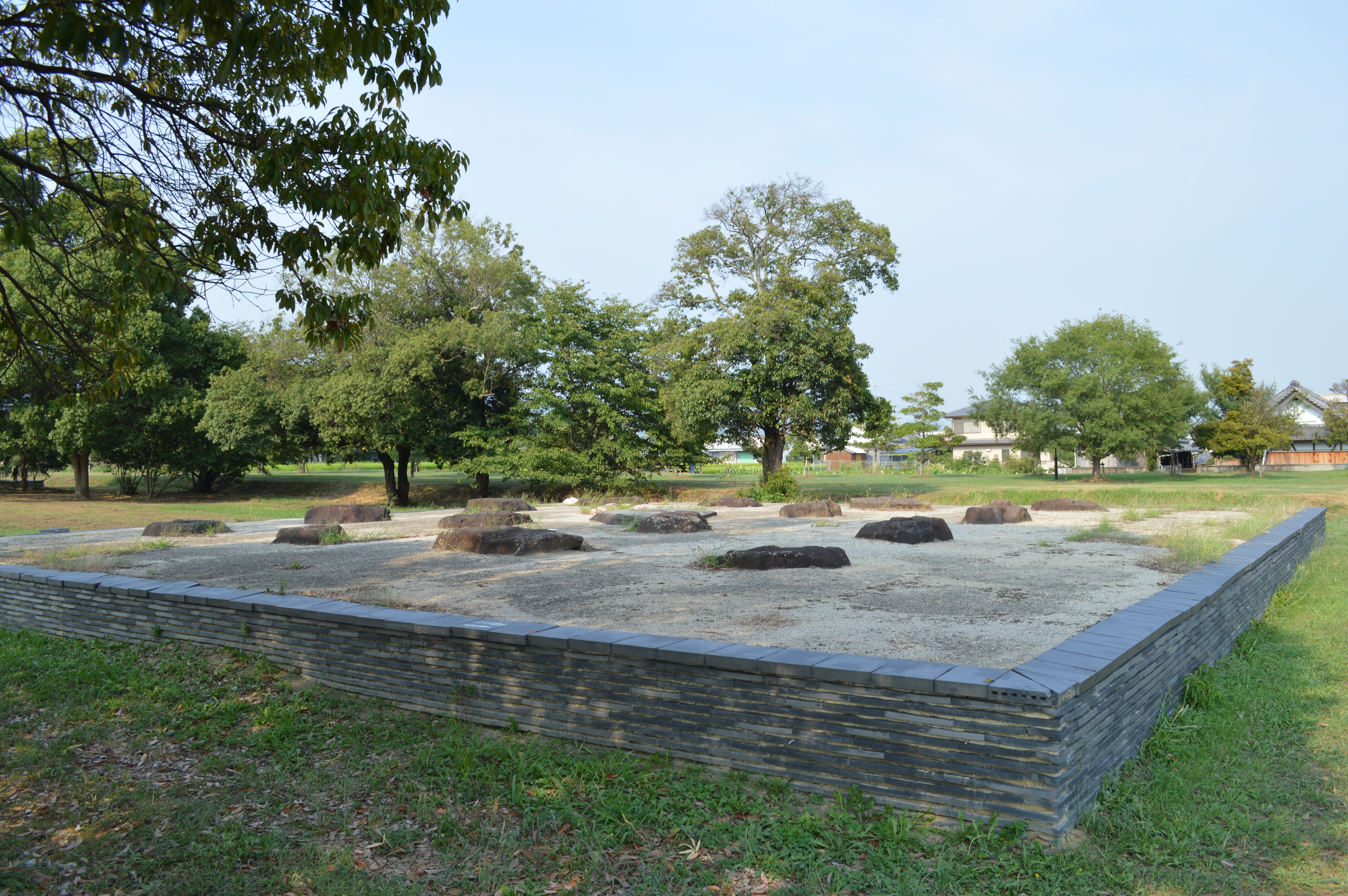
Base of the Pagoda

== See also ==
- List of Historic Sites of Japan (Wakayama)
- Nishi Kokubun pagoda site, ruins of the provincial nunnery associated with the Kii Kokubun-ji
- provincial temple
