= Hoshiya Station =

Railway station in Wakayama, Wakayama Prefecture, Japan

Coordinates: 34.2446°N 135.2616°E

Hoshiya Station 布施屋駅
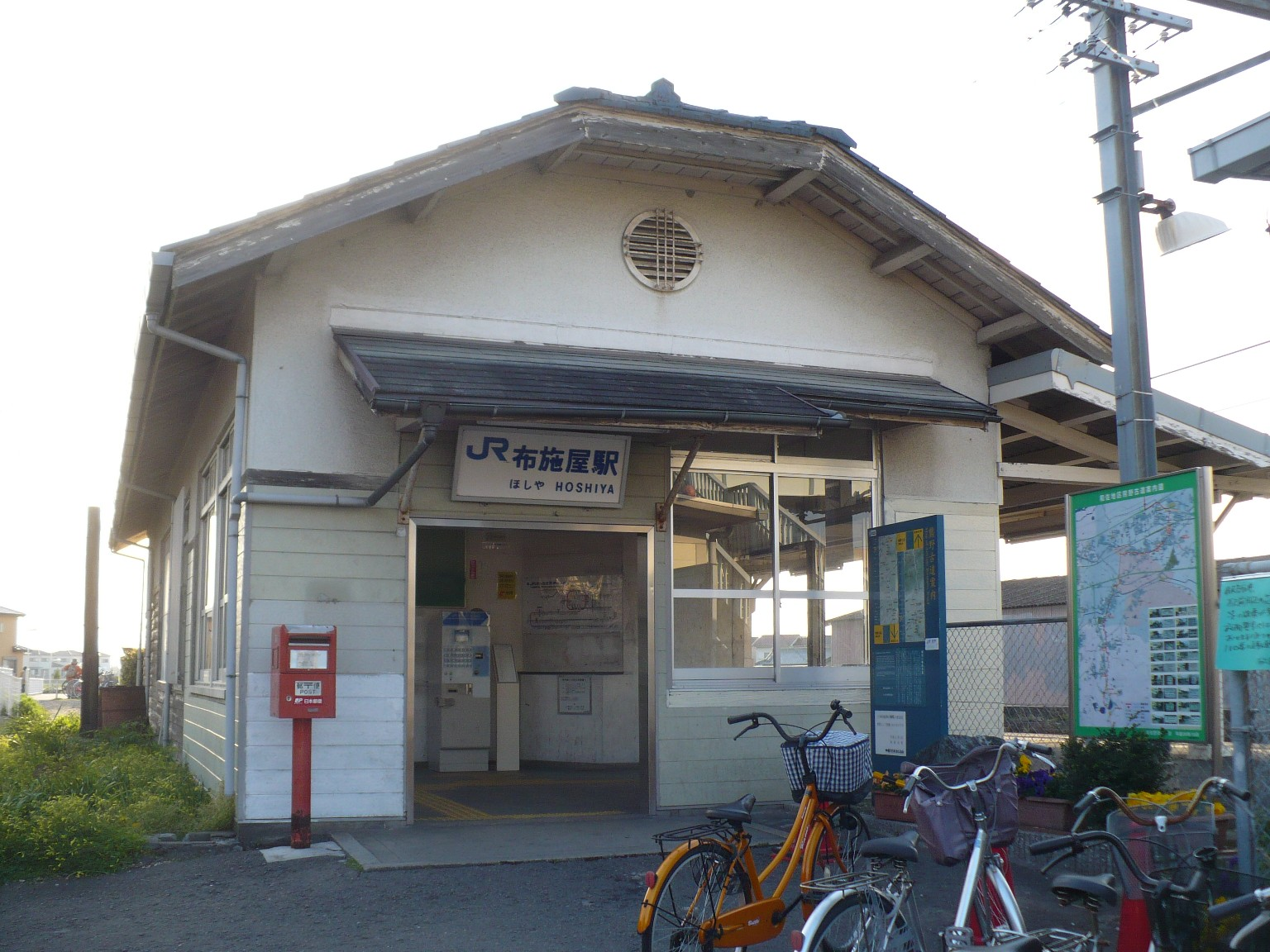
- Hoshiya Station in April 2010

General information
- Location: 621-2 Hoshiya, Wakayama-shi, Wakayama-ken 649-6321; Japan
- Owner: West Japan Railway Company
- Operator: West Japan Railway Company
- Line: T Wakayama Line
- Distance: 79.9 km (49.6 miles) from Ōji
- Platforms: 2 side platforms
- Tracks: 2
- Train operators: West Japan Railway Company

Other information
- Status: Unstaffed
- Website: Official website

History
- Opened: 3 May 1899

Passengers
- FY2019: 352 daily
Services
| Preceding station | JR-West | Following station |
Wakayama Line
Rapid Service: Does not stop at this station
| Kii-Ogura | Local | Senda |
Location
- Location within Wakayama Prefecture Location within Japan

Hoshiya Station (布施屋駅, Hoshiya-eki) is a passenger railway station in located in the city of Wakayama, Wakayama Prefecture, Japan, operated by West Japan Railway Company (JR West).

== Lines ==
Hoshiya Station is served by the Wakayama Line, and is located 79.9 kilometers from the terminus of the line at Ōji Station.

== Station layout ==
The station consists of two opposed side platforms connected by an open footbridge. The station is unattended.

=== Platforms ===
| 1 | ■ T Wakayama Line | for Wakayama |
| 2 | ■ T Wakayama Line | for Kokawa and Hashimoto |

== Adjacent stations ==
| « | Service | » |
Wakayama Line
Rapid Service: Does not stop at this station
| Kii-Ogura | Local | Senda |

== History ==
Hoshiya Station opened on May 3, 1899 as a temporary stop on the Kiwa Railway and raised to full passenger station on October 1. The line was sold to the Kansai Railway in 1904, which was subsequently nationalized in 1907. With the privatization of the Japan National Railways (JNR) on April 1, 1987, the station came under the aegis of the West Japan Railway Company.

== Passenger statistics ==
In fiscal 2019, the station was used by an average of 352 passengers daily (boarding passengers only).

== Surrounding area ==
- Wakayama City Takazumi Junior High School
- JR Freight Wakayama Off Rail Station
- Hoshiya Station Square Park

== See also ==
- List of railway stations in Japan
