= Funato Station =

Railway station in Iwade, Wakayama Prefecture, Japan

Funato Station 船戸駅
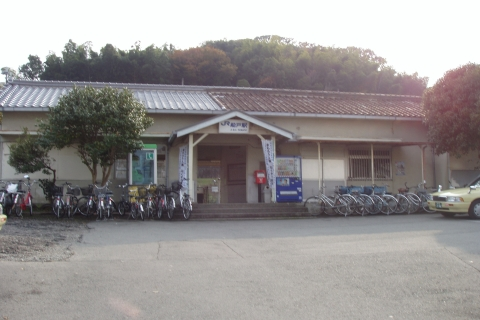
- Funato Station

General information
- Location: 204-1, Funato, Iwade-shi, Wakayama-ken 649-6225; Japan
- Coordinates: 34°14′55″N 135°18′42″E
- Owner: West Japan Railway Company
- Operator: West Japan Railway Company
- Line: T Wakayama Line
- Distance: 75.3 km (46.8 miles) from Ōji
- Platforms: 2 side platforms
- Tracks: 2
- Train operators: West Japan Railway Company

Other information
- Status: Unstaffed
- Website: Official website

History
- Opened: 1 January 1899

Passengers
- FY2019: 256 daily
Services
| Preceding station | JR-West | Following station |
Wakayama Line
Rapid Service: Does not stop at this station
| Iwade | Local | Kii-Ogura |
Location
- Location within Wakayama Prefecture Location within Japan

Funato Station (船戸駅, Funato-eki) is a passenger railway station in located in the city of Iwade, Wakayama Prefecture, Japan, operated by West Japan Railway Company (JR West).

== Lines ==
Funato Station is served by the Wakayama Line, and is located 75.3 kilometers from the terminus of the line at Ōji Station.

== Station layout ==
The station consists of two opposed side platforms connected by an open footbridge. The station is unattended.

=== Platforms ===
| 1 | ■ T Wakayama Line | for Kokawa and Hashimoto |
| 2 | ■ T Wakayama Line | for Wakayama |

== Adjacent stations ==
| « | Service | » |
Wakayama Line
Rapid Service: Does not stop at this station
| Iwade | Local | Kii-Ogura |

== History ==
Funato Station opened on January 1,1899 on the Kiwa Railway. The line was sold to the Kansai Railway in 1904, which was subsequently nationalized in 1907. With the privatization of the Japan National Railways (JNR) on April 1, 1987, the station came under the aegis of the West Japan Railway Company.

== Passenger statistics ==
In fiscal 2019, the station was used by an average of 256 passengers daily (boarding passengers only).

== Surrounding Area ==
- Omiya Shrine
- Iwade City Iwade Elementary School
- old Yamato Kaido
- Funatoyama Kofun

== See also ==
- List of railway stations in Japan
