= Kokawa-dera =

Buddhist temple in Kinokawa, Wakayama, Japan

- 粉河寺
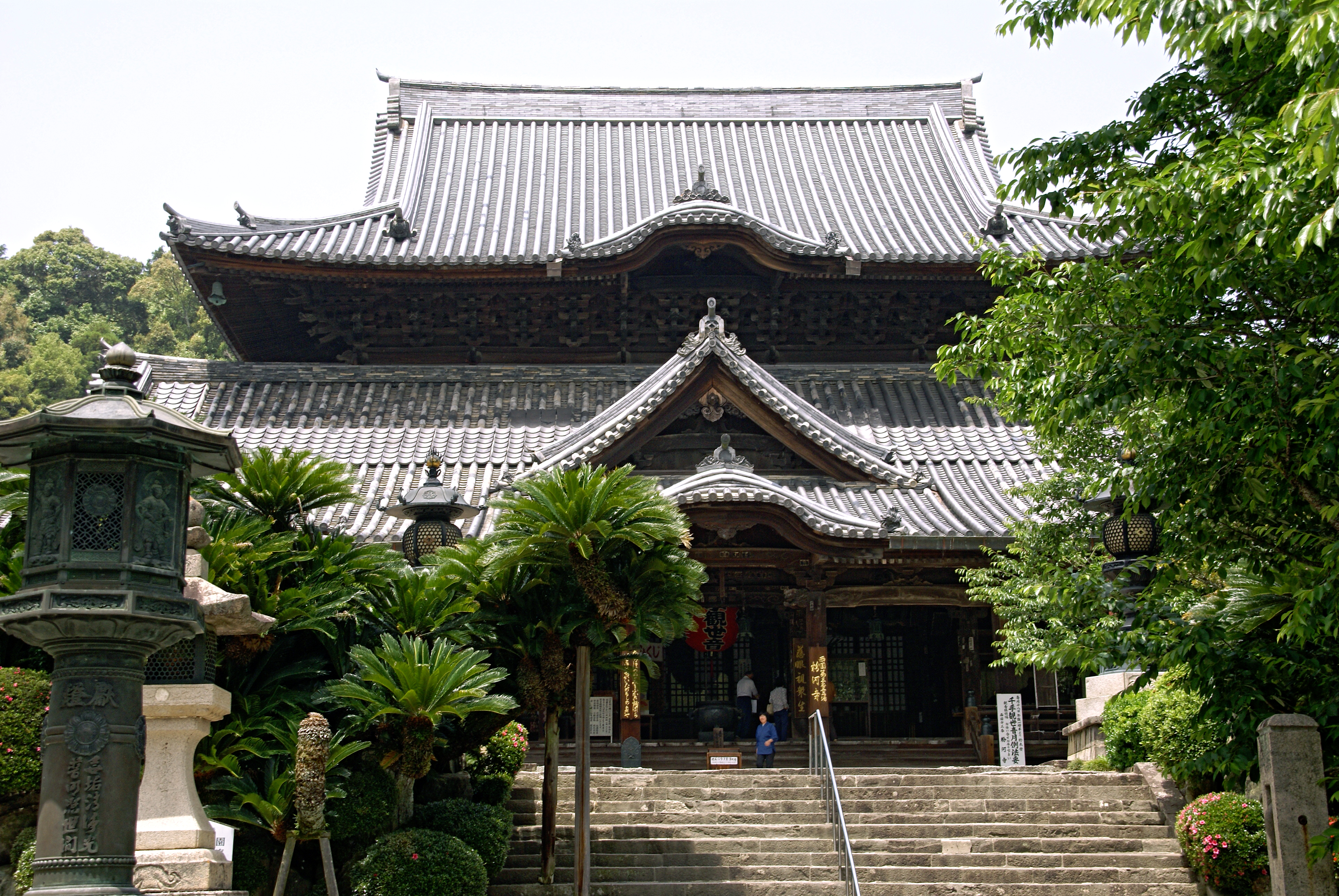
- Kokawa-dera Hondo

- Location within Wakayama Prefecture Location within Japan

Religion
- Affiliation: Buddhist
- Deity: Senjū Kannon
- Rite: Tendai-affiliated
- Status: functional

Location
- Location: 2787 Kokawa, Kinokawa-shi, Wakayama-ken
- Interactive map of Kokawa-dera
- Coordinates: 34°16′51.46″N 135°24′21.27″E

Architecture
- Founder: c. Otomo Kōshikō
- Completed: c.770

Website
- Official website
- National Treasure National Important Cultural Property National Place of Scenic Beauty

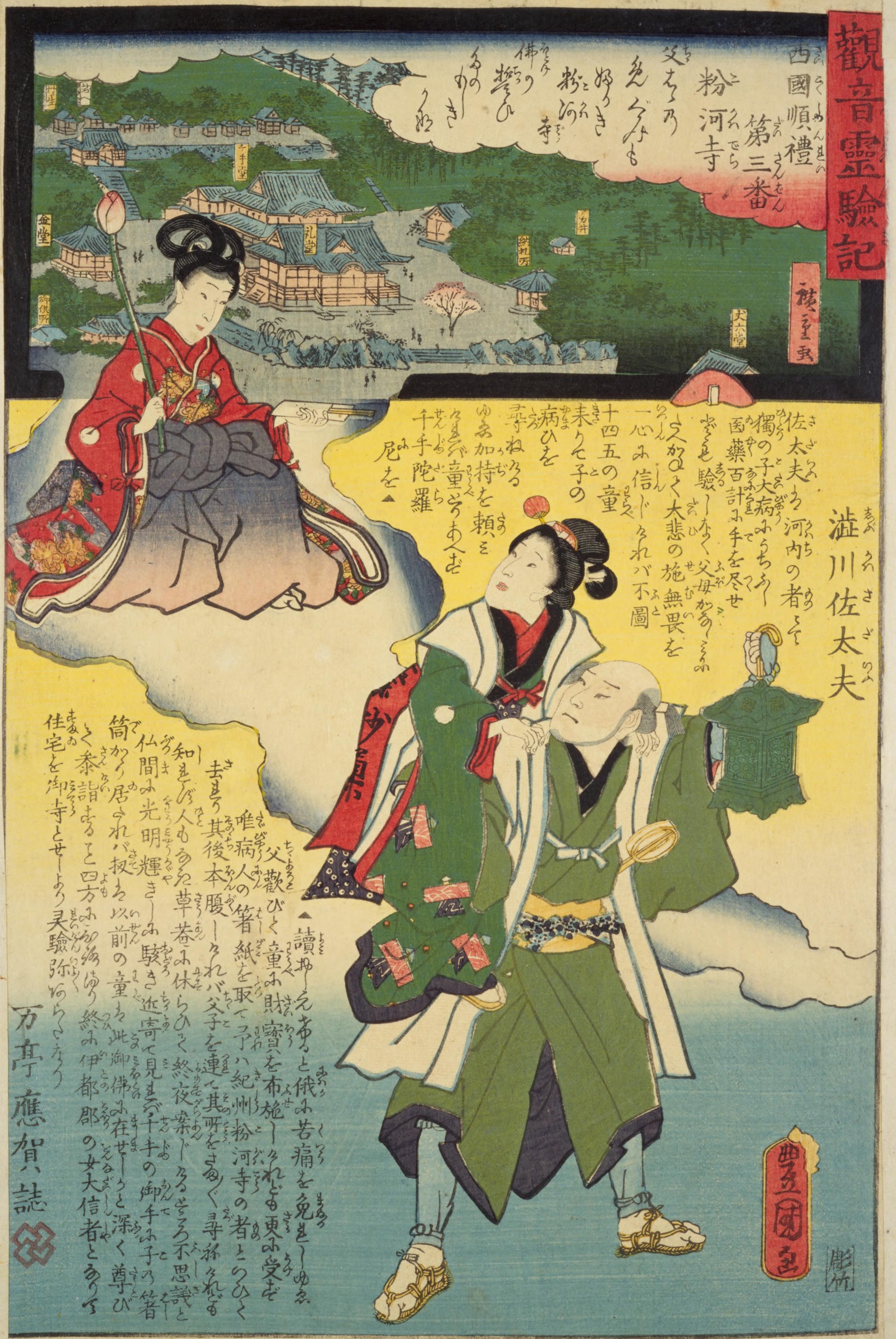
from the picture album "Kannon Reigen ki"

Kokawa-dera (粉河寺) is a Buddhist temple located in the Kokawa neighborhood of the city of Kinokawa, Wakayama Prefecture Japan. It belongs to the Tendai sect of Japanese Buddhism and its honzon (primary image) is an absolute hibutsu (secret/hidden) statue of Senjū Kannon Bosatsu, which has never been displayed to the public. In Japanese Buddhist temples, if the principal image is a secret image, a substitute statue called an "omaetachi" is often placed in front of the principal image's altar, but at Kokawa-dera, the "omaetachi" statue is also a secret image. The principal image is said to be buried in a container underground beneath the main hall to prevent fires. The "omaetachi" statue is only opened once a year on December 31 for cleaning by monks connected with the temple - lay people have no opportunity to view it. The temple's full name is Kazaragi-san Kokawa-dera (風猛山 粉河寺) . The temple is the 3rd stop on the 33 temple Saigoku Kannon Pilgrimage route.

== History ==
Details surrounding the founding of this temple are uncertain. According to the "Kokawa-dera Engi" documents, one day in the first year of the Hōki era (770), Otomo Kōshikō, a hunter from Kii Province, discovered a mysterious light emanating from a spot in the mountains and built a small hermitage there. This is said to be the beginning of Kokawa-dera. Some time after that, a young ascetic visited Kōshikō's home and asked to stay overnight. As a token of gratitude for the lodging, the boy spent seven days carving a statue of the Juichimen Kannon. On the morning of the eighth day, Kōshikō found that the boy was gone, leaving behind only a golden statue of the Jūchimen Kannon. Kōshikō reportedly stopped killing and began to worship Kannon.

A second story in the "Kokawa-dera Engi" tells that the daughter of a wealthy man named Satafu in Kawachi Province was seriously ill and had no idea how long she would live. A young ascetic appeared out of nowhere and prayed to the Jūichimen Kannon, and the daughter's illness was completely cured. The delighted man offered his treasures as a token of gratitude, but the ascetic refused. Instead, he took only the girl's sash and scarlet hakama, and departed, saying, "I'm in Naka County, Kii Province." The wealthy man and his family visited Naka County and found a Jūichimen Kannon statue standing in a small hermitage, with the girl's sash and scarlet hakama in the Kannon's hands. Upon realizing that the ascetic had been an incarnation of Kannon, the family immediately entered holy orders and dedicated themselves to the prosperity of Kokawa-ji.

While these legends are unsupported by a historical documentation, it is certain that Kokawa-ji flourished during the Heian period under the patronage of the imperial court and aristocracy. Sei Shōnagon's "Pillow Book," chapter 194, reads, "The temples are Tsubosaka, Kasagi, Hōrin, Kōyasan, Ishiyama, Kokawa, and Shiga," while the 12th century Ryōjin Hishō reads, "Temples where Kannon signs are seen: Kiyomizu, Ishiyama, Hase-no-Miyama, Kokawa (rest omitted)." References to Kokawa-dera in Saigyō's "Sankashu" and the fictional stories "Utsubo Monogatari" and "Sagomo Monogatari" indicate that it was well known as a Kannon sacred site by the mid-Heian period, in the 10th century at the latest. In the late Heian period, it flourished as one of the temples on the pilgrimage to the Thirty-three Kannon Temples of the Western Provinces, which began around that time.

In the Kamakura period, as a Tendai sect temple, it had seven halls, 550 sub-temples, a large number of warrior monks, and vast shōen estates with a total landholding of 40,000 koku, making it a large temple comparable to Negoro-ji and Kongōbu-ji.

In 1573, during the Sengoku period, Saruokayama Castle was built on Mount Akihacto, to the south of the temple grounds, to defend it. However, in 1585, the temple was attacked by Toyotomi Hideyoshi during his conquest of Kii Province. Despite resisting alongside Negoro-ji, the entire mountain was burned down and Saruokayama Castle also fell. The Kokawa-dera Engi emaki scroll was also destroyed during the fire.

The temple was eventually rebuilt; however in 1713, a major fire destroyed most of the buildings, leaving only the main gate. Most of the current temple buildings were rebuilt after that. On September 21, 1934, the Muroto Typhoon caused heavy rains that knocked down many trees and crushed the bell tower. After the Pacific War, the temple declared its independence from the Tendai sect and became the head temple of its own Kokawa Kannon sect.

== Images of the temple ==
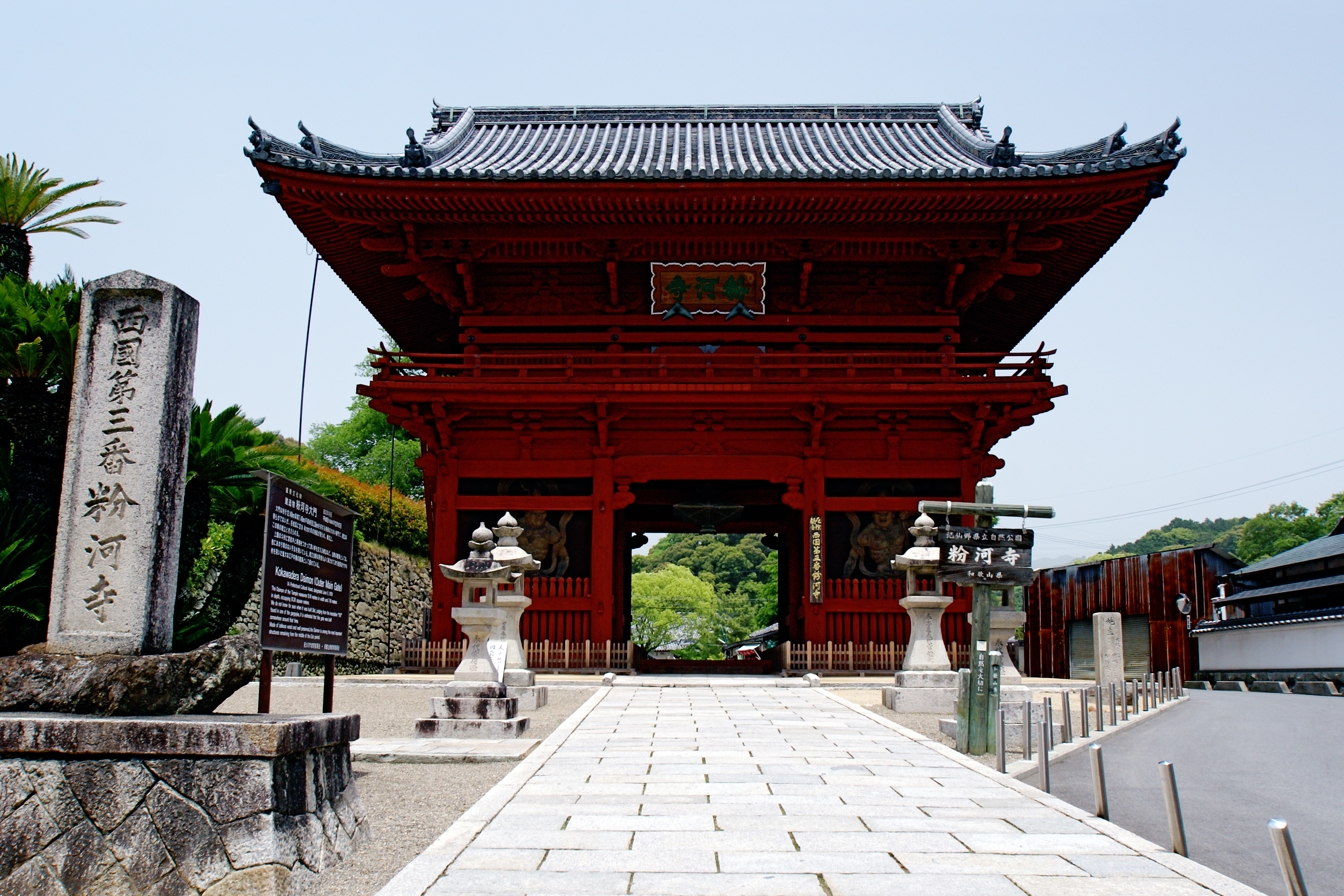
Daimon

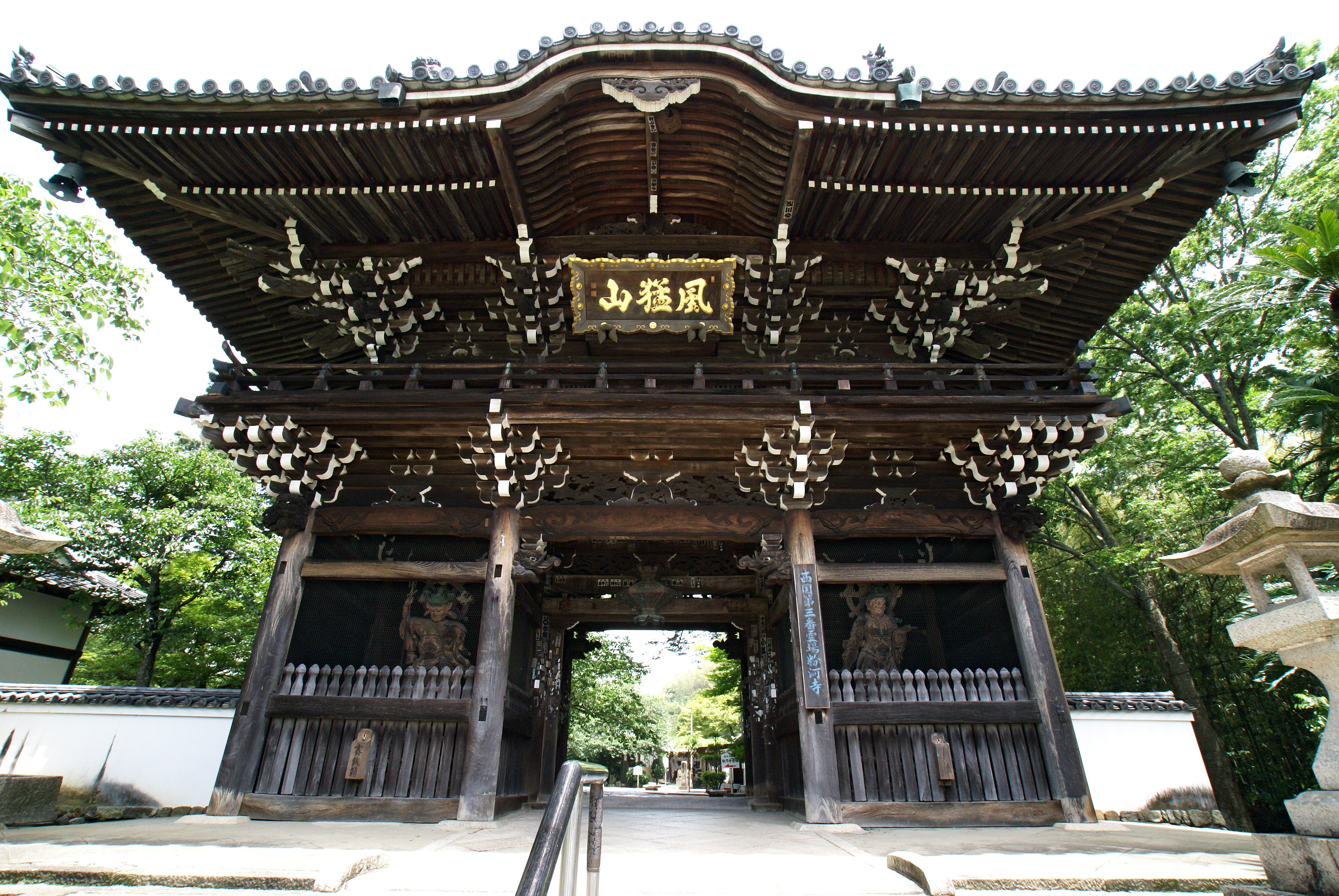
Middle Gate

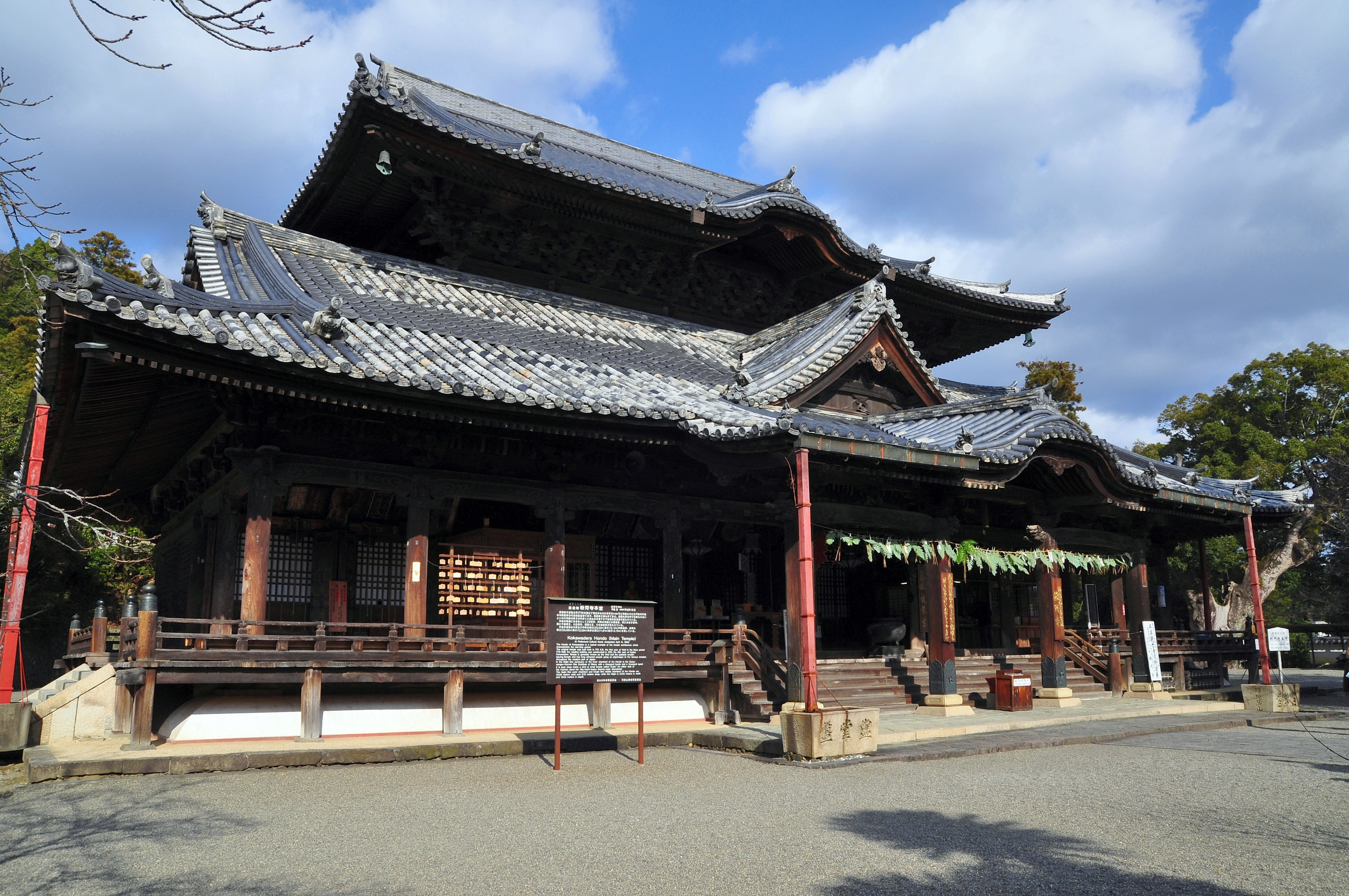
Hondō

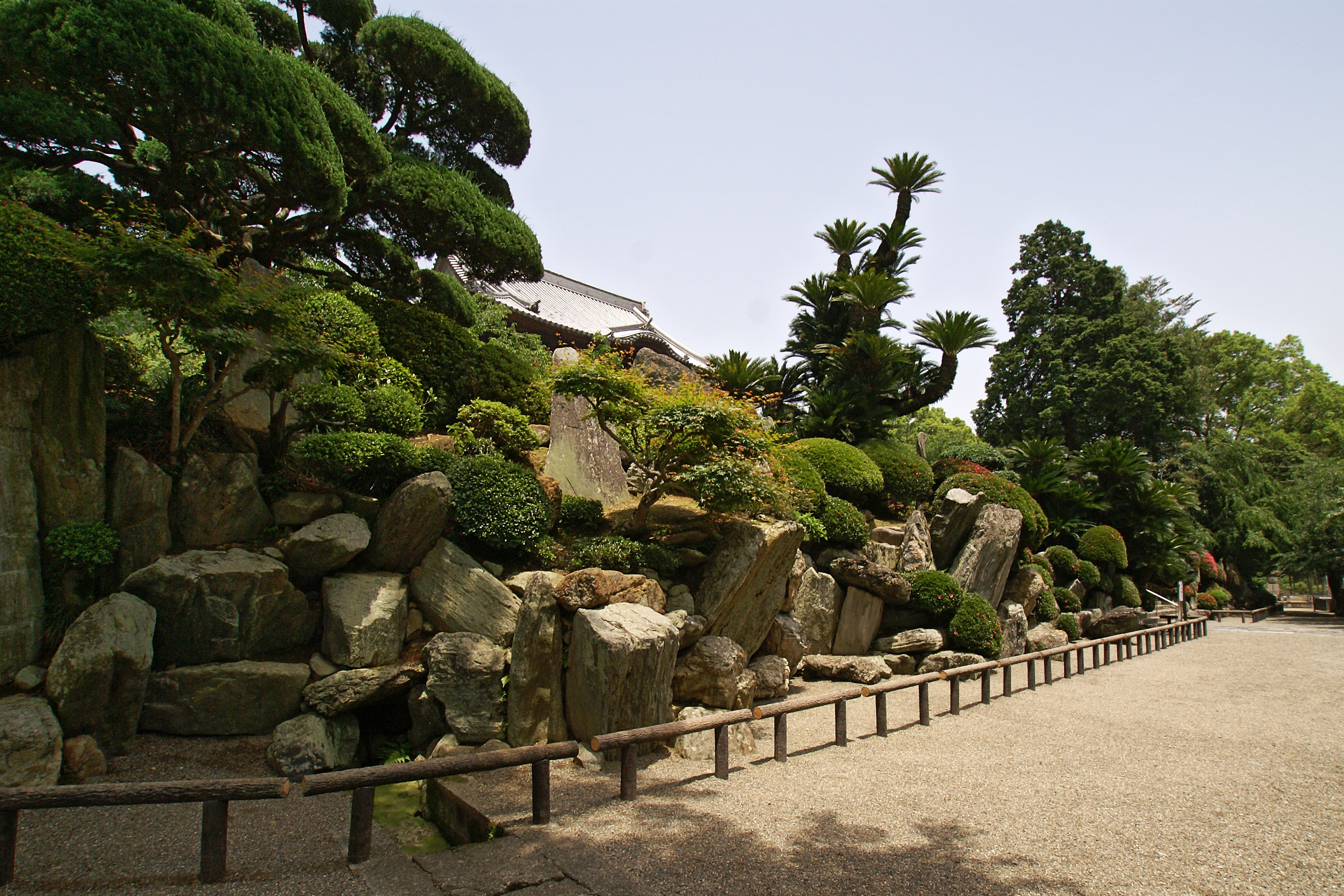
Gardens

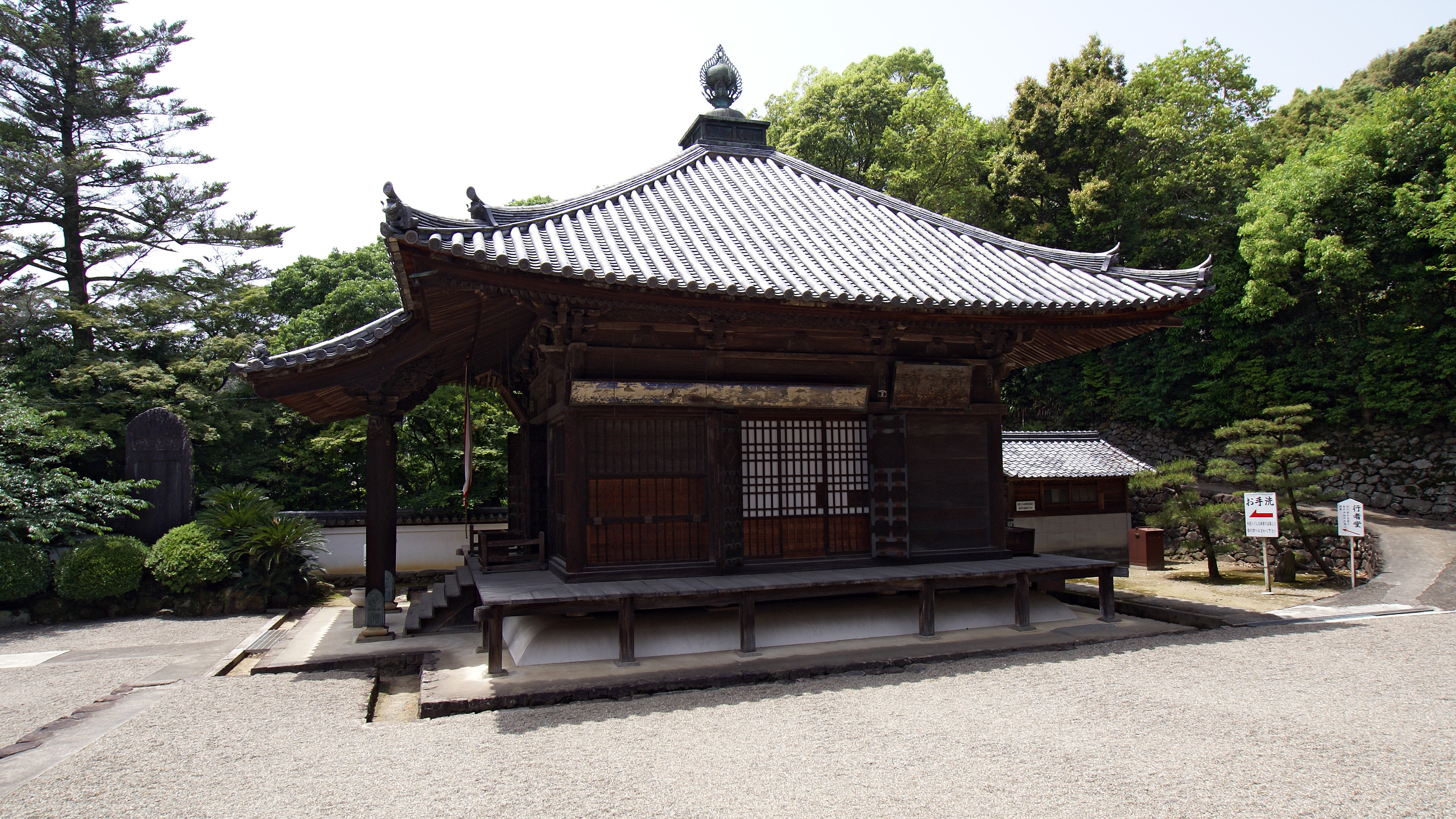
Senjū-dō

== Access ==
The temple is approximately a ten-minute walk from Kokawa Station on the JR West Wakayama Line.

== Cultural Properties ==
=== National Treasure ===
- Colored Paper emaki of the Kokawa-dera Legend (紙本著色粉河寺縁起絵巻 1巻（絵画）), Kamakura period; now at Kyoto National Museum

=== National Important Cultural Properties ===
- Hondō (本堂 附：指図3枚および文書1紙), Edo period (1713);
- Senjū-dō (千手堂), Edo period (1760);
- Nakamon (中門), Edo period (1832);
- Daimon (大門), Edo period (1754);

=== Wakayama Prefecture Designated Tangible Cultural Properties ===
- Danan-dō (童男堂), Edo period (1679)
- Daimon Bridge Balustrade with Jeweled Ornaments (大門橋高欄宝珠), Azuchi-Momoyama period (1605) <"Bunka3"/>

=== Kinokawa City Designated Tangible Cultural Properties ===
- Bronze statue of seated Amida Nyorai (阿弥陀如来像), Edo period (1862); Donated by Tokugawa Shigenori, the 8th daimyō of Kishū Domain
- Stone statue of standing Jizō Bosatsu (石造地蔵菩薩立像),
- Kokawa-dera Ishi-no-ma-no-zu (粉河寺諸伽藍石之間之図),
- Washbasin (lotus leaf bowl) (御池坊庭園), Edo period (1775)

=== Kinokawa City Designated Place of Scenic Beauty ===
- 'Oikebo Garden (盥漱盤（荷葉鉢),

=== National Place of Scenic Beauty ===
- Kokawa-dera Gardens (粉河寺庭園), designated in 1970

== See also ==
- List of National Treasures of Japan (paintings)
- List of Places of Scenic Beauty of Japan (Wakayama)
