= Iwade, Wakayama =

Iwade 岩出市
- City
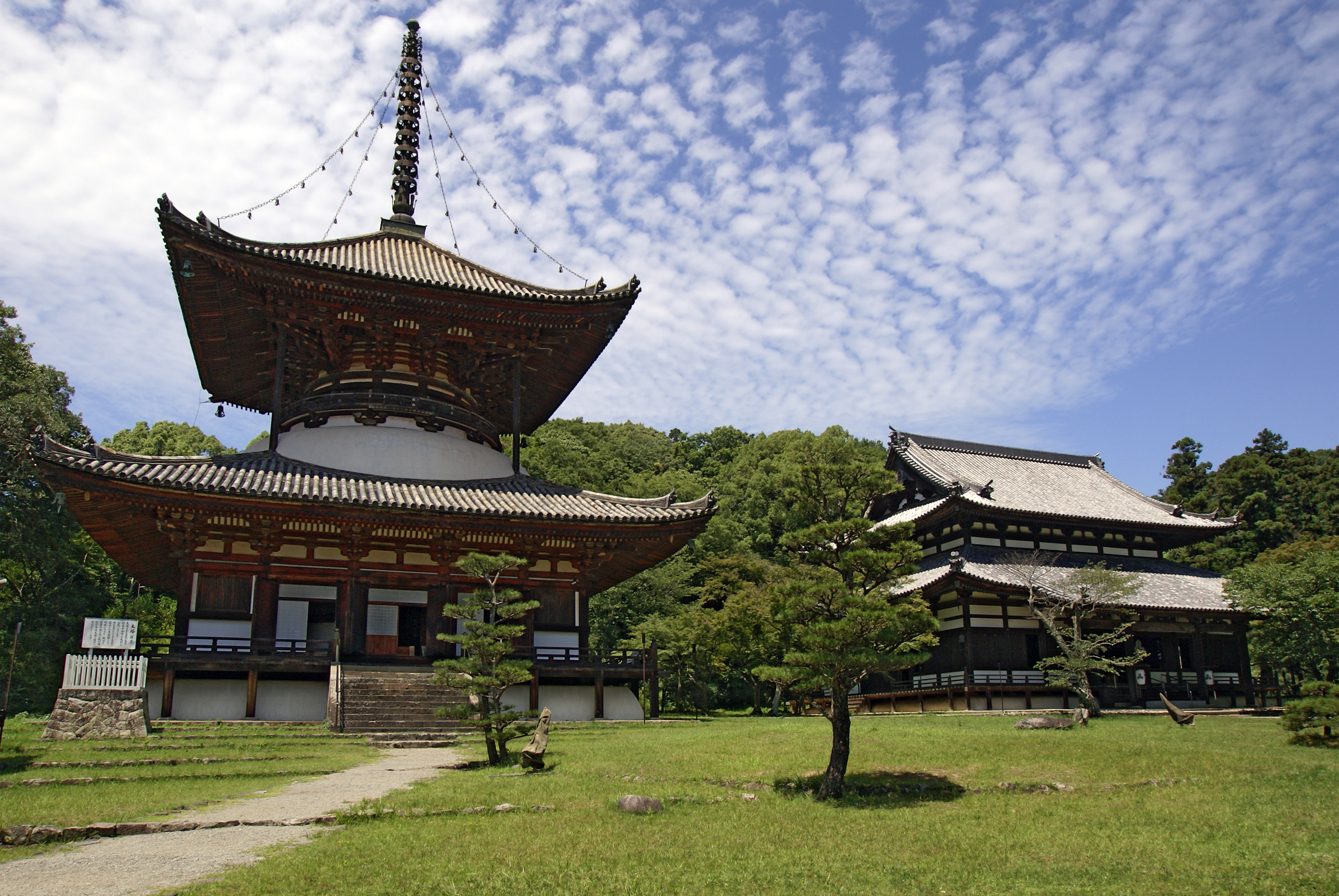
- Negoro Temple in Iwade

- Flag Emblem

- Location of Iwade in Wakayama Prefecture

- Location in Japan
- Coordinates: 34°15′N 135°19′E
- Country: Japan
- Region: Kansai
- Prefecture: Wakayama

Government
  - Mayor: Masayuki Nakashiba (since October 1996)

Area
  - Total: 38.51 km^{2} (14.87 sq mi)

Population (February 2021)
  - Total: 53,280
  - Density: 1,384/km^{2} (3,583/sq mi)
- Time zone: UTC+09:00 (JST)
- City hall address: 209 Nishino, Iwade-shi, Wakayama-ken 649-6292
- Website: Official website
- Symbols
- Bird: Cettia diphone
- Flower: Cherry blossom
- Tree: Quecus phillyraeoides (Ubamekashi in Japanese)

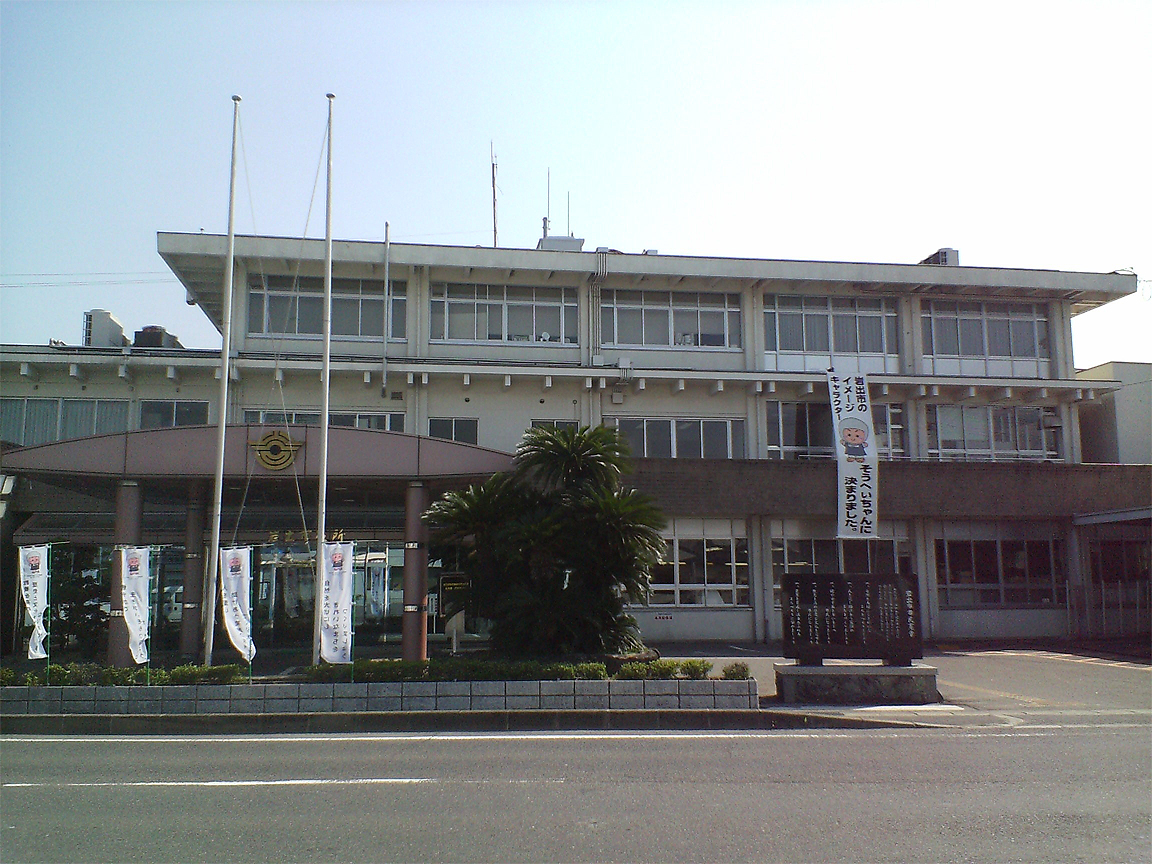
Iwade city hall

Iwade (岩出市, Iwade-shi; Japanese pronunciation: [ì.β̞ä́.dé̞(.ɕì)]) is a city located in Wakayama Prefecture, Japan. As of 1 November 2021, the city had an estimated population of 54,138 in 23906 households and a population density of 1400 persons per km^{2}. The total area of the city is 38.51 square kilometres (14.87 sq mi).

== Geography ==
Iwade is located on the northern border of Wakayama Prefecture with Osaka Prefecture. The Kinokawa River flows along the southern border of Iwade.

=== Neighboring municipalities ===
Osaka Prefecture

- Hannan
- Sennan

Wakayama Prefecture

- Kinokawa
- Wakayama (city)

== Climate ==
Iwade has a Humid subtropical climate (Köppen Cfa) characterized by warm summers and cool winters with light to no snowfall. The average annual temperature in Iwade is 15.1 °C. The average annual rainfall is 1713 mm with September as the wettest month. The temperatures are highest on average in August, at around 26.5 °C, and lowest in January, at around 4.4 °C.

== Demographics ==
Per Japanese census data, the population of Iwade has increased rapidly over the past 60 years.

Historical population
Year	Pop.	±%
1960	12,810	—
1970	15,980	+24.7%
1980	24,125	+51.0%
1990	32,846	+36.1%
2000	48,156	+46.6%
2010	52,890	+9.8%

== History ==
The area of the modern city of Iwade was within ancient Kii Province. Negoroji temple was founded in the 12th century. After the Meiji restoration, the area became part of Naga District, Wakayama, and the village of Iwade was established with the creation of the modern municipalities system on April 1, 1889. Iwade was promoted to town status on August 1, 1908. On September 30, 1956 Yade annexed the neighboring villages of Yamazaki, Negoro and Kamiiwade. The five towns in Naga District other than Iwade merged on November 7, 2005 to become the city of Kinokawa. However, as the town had a population of more than 50,000 people as of the 2005 census Iwade fulfilled the requirements to gain city status by both the ordinance of Wakayama Prefecture and Local Government Law. At the request of residents, Iwade decided to gain city status alone, which was attained on April 1, 2006

== Government ==
Iwade has a mayor-council form of government with a directly elected mayor and a unicameral city council of 14 members. Iwade contributes two members to the Wakayama Prefectural Assembly. In terms of national politics, the city is part of Wakayama 2nd district of the lower house of the Diet of Japan.

== Economy ==
Iwade has a mixed economy of light manufacturing, logistics, and agriculture. Due to its proximity to the city of Wakayama, it is increasingly becoming a bedroom community.

== Education ==
Iwade has six public elementary schools and two public middle schools operated by the city government and one public high school operated by the Wakayama Prefectural Department of Education.

== Transportation ==
=== Railway ===
JR West – Wakayama Line

- Funato - Iwade

=== Highway ===
- Keinawa Expressway
- National Route 24

== Local attractions ==
- Negoroji temple
- Nishi Kokubun pagoda site
- Wakayama Prefecture Botanical Park
