= Senda Station =

Railway station in Wakayama, Wakayama Prefecture, Japan

Senda Station 千旦駅
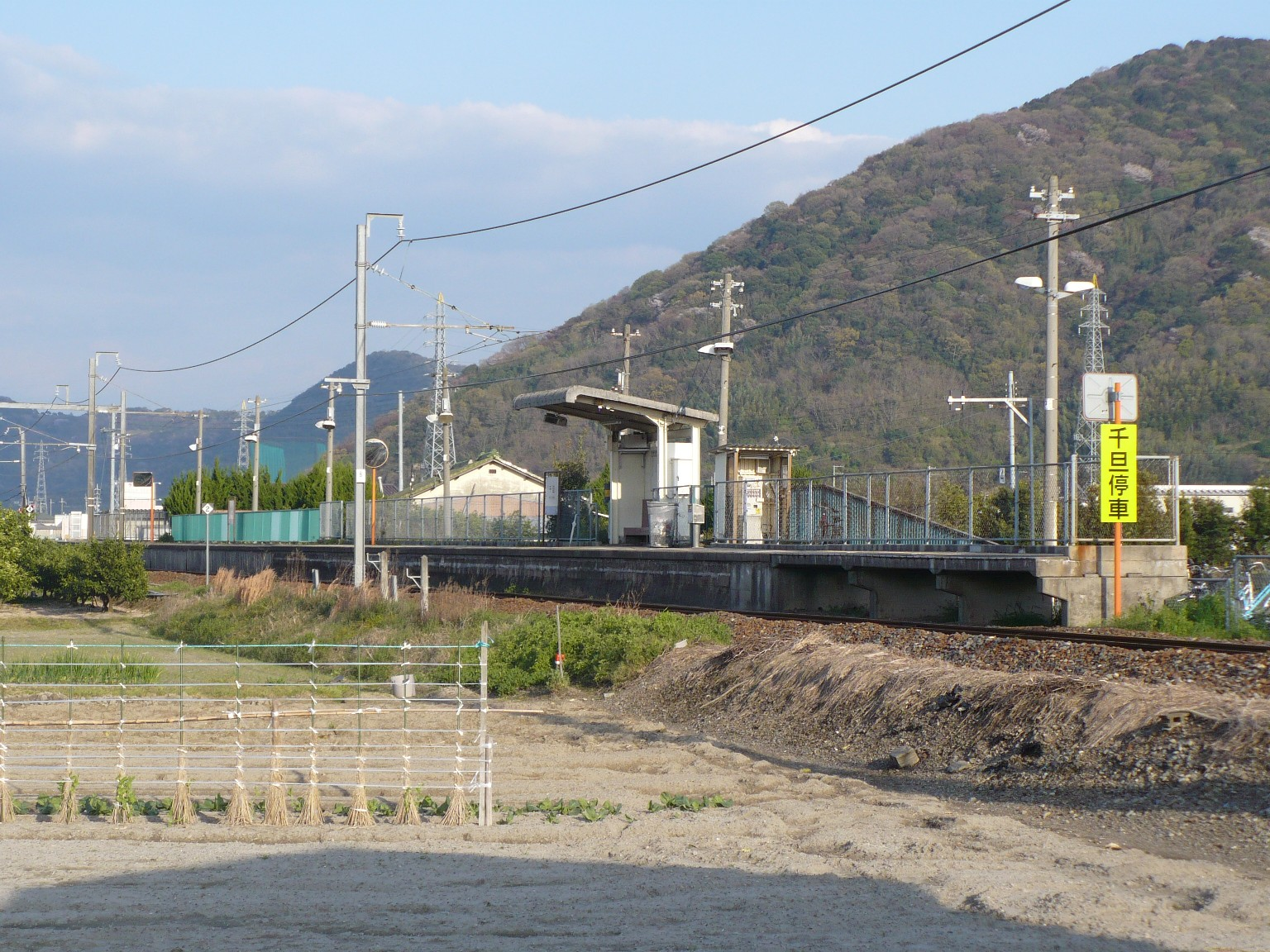
- Senda Station, April 2010

General information
- Location: Inokuchi, Wakayama-shi, Wakayama-ken 649-6323; Japan
- Coordinates: 34.2418°N 135.2455°E
- Owner: West Japan Railway Company
- Operator: West Japan Railway Company
- Line: T Wakayama Line
- Distance: 81.4 km (50.6 miles) from Ōji
- Platforms: 1 side platform
- Tracks: 1
- Train operators: West Japan Railway Company

Other information
- Status: Unstaffed
- Website: Official website

History
- Opened: 1 October 1952

Passengers
- FY2019: 187 daily
Services
Preceding station	JR-West	Following station
Wakayama Line
Rapid Service: Does not stop at this station
Hoshiya	Local	Tainose
Location
- Location within Wakayama Prefecture Location within Japan

Senda Station (千旦駅, Senda-eki) is a passenger railway station in located in the city of Wakayama, Wakayama Prefecture, Japan, operated by West Japan Railway Company (JR West).

== Lines ==
Senda Station is served by the Wakayama Line, and is located 81.4 kilometers from the terminus of the line at Ōji Station.

== Station layout ==
The station consists of one side platform serving a single bi-directional track. There is no station building, but only a shelter on the platform, and the station is unattended.

== Adjacent stations ==
«	Service	»
Wakayama Line
Rapid Service: Does not stop at this station
Hoshiya	Local	Tainose

== History ==
Senda Station opened on October 1, 1952. With the privatization of the Japan National Railways (JNR) on April 1, 1987, the station came under the aegis of the West Japan Railway Company.

== Passenger statistics ==
In fiscal 2019, the station was used by an average of 187 passengers daily (boarding passengers only).

== Surrounding Area ==
The station is located in a rural area surrounded by fields.

== See also ==
- List of railway stations in Japan
