= Shimoisaka Station =

Railway station in Kinokawa, Wakayama Prefecture, Japan

Shimoisaka Station 下井阪駅
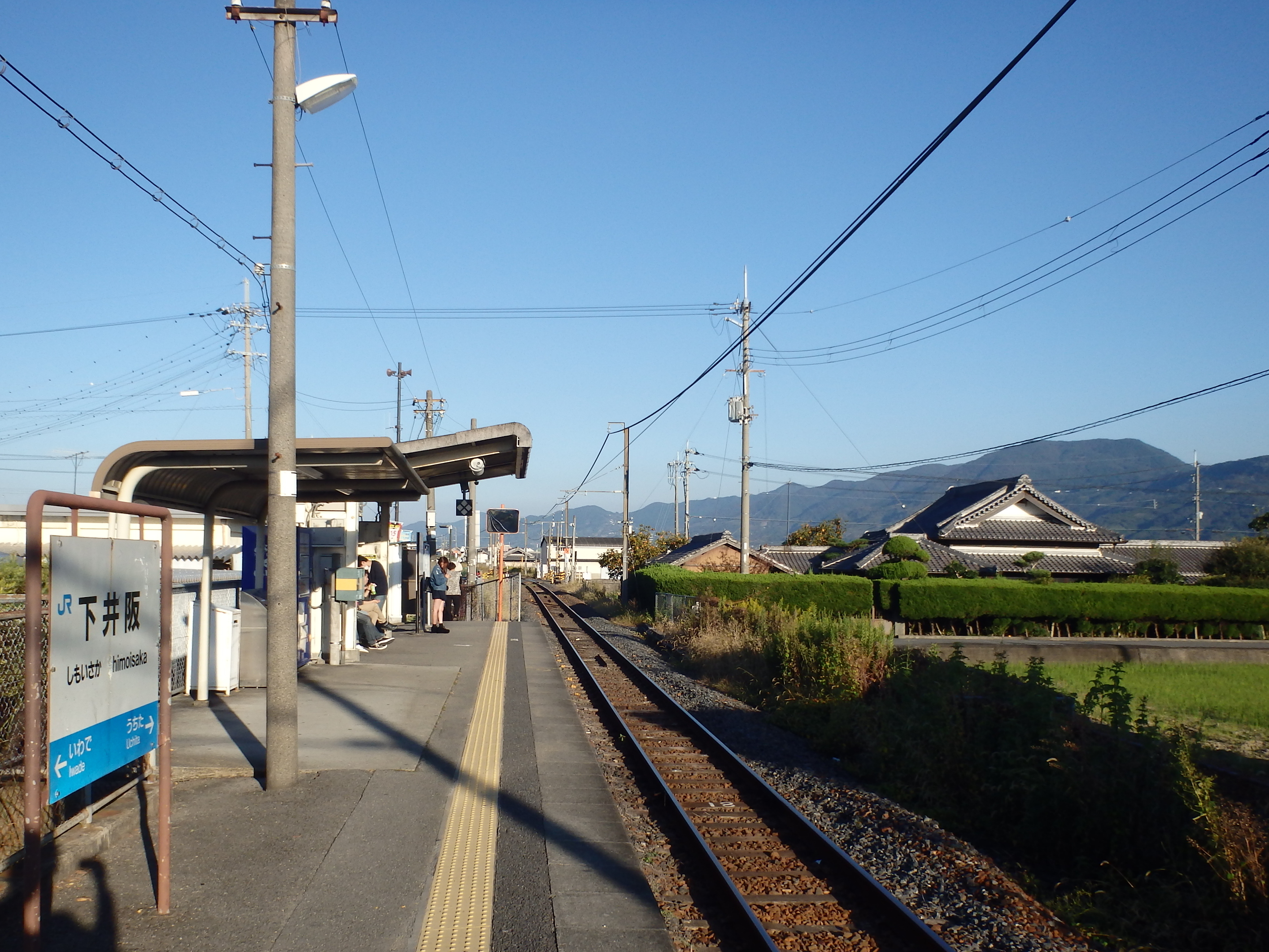
- Shimoisaka Station, October 2015

General information
- Location: 551-1 Shimoisaka-chō Imou, Kinokawa-shi, Wakayama-ken 649-6426; Japan
- Coordinates: 34.2622°N 135.3403°E
- System: JR-West commuter rail station
- Owner: West Japan Railway Company
- Operator: West Japan Railway Company
- Line: T Wakayama Line
- Distance: 72.0 km (44.7 miles) from Ōji
- Platforms: 1 side platform
- Tracks: 1
- Train operators: West Japan Railway Company

Other information
- Status: Unstaffed
- Website: Official website

History
- Opened: 15 July 1938

Passengers
- FY2019: 433 daily
Services
Preceding station	JR-West	Following station
Wakayama Line
Rapid Service: Does not stop at this station
Uchita	Local	Iwade
Location
- Location within Wakayama Prefecture Location within Japan

Shimoisaka Station (下井阪駅, Shimoisaka-eki) is a passenger railway station in located in the city of Kinokawa, Wakayama Prefecture, Japan, operated by West Japan Railway Company (JR West).

== Lines ==
Shimoisaka Station is served by the Wakayama Line, and is located 72.0 kilometers from the terminus of the line at Ōji Station.

== Station layout ==
The station consists of one side platform serving a single bi-directional track. There is no station building, but only a weather shelter on the platform. The station is unattended.

== Adjacent stations ==
«	Service	»
Wakayama Line
Rapid Service: Does not stop at this station
Uchita	Local	Iwade

== History ==
Shimoisaka Station opened on July 15, 1938. With the privatization of the Japan National Railways (JNR) on April 1, 1987, the station came under the aegis of the West Japan Railway Company.

== Passenger statistics ==
In fiscal 2019, the station was used by an average of 433 passengers daily (boarding passengers only).

== Surrounding Area ==
- Kinki University Wakayama Campus (Faculty of Biophysical Engineering)
- Kii Kokubun-ji ruins

== See also ==
- List of railway stations in Japan
