= Uchita Station =

Railway station in Kinokawa, Wakayama Prefecture, Japan

Uchita Station 打田駅
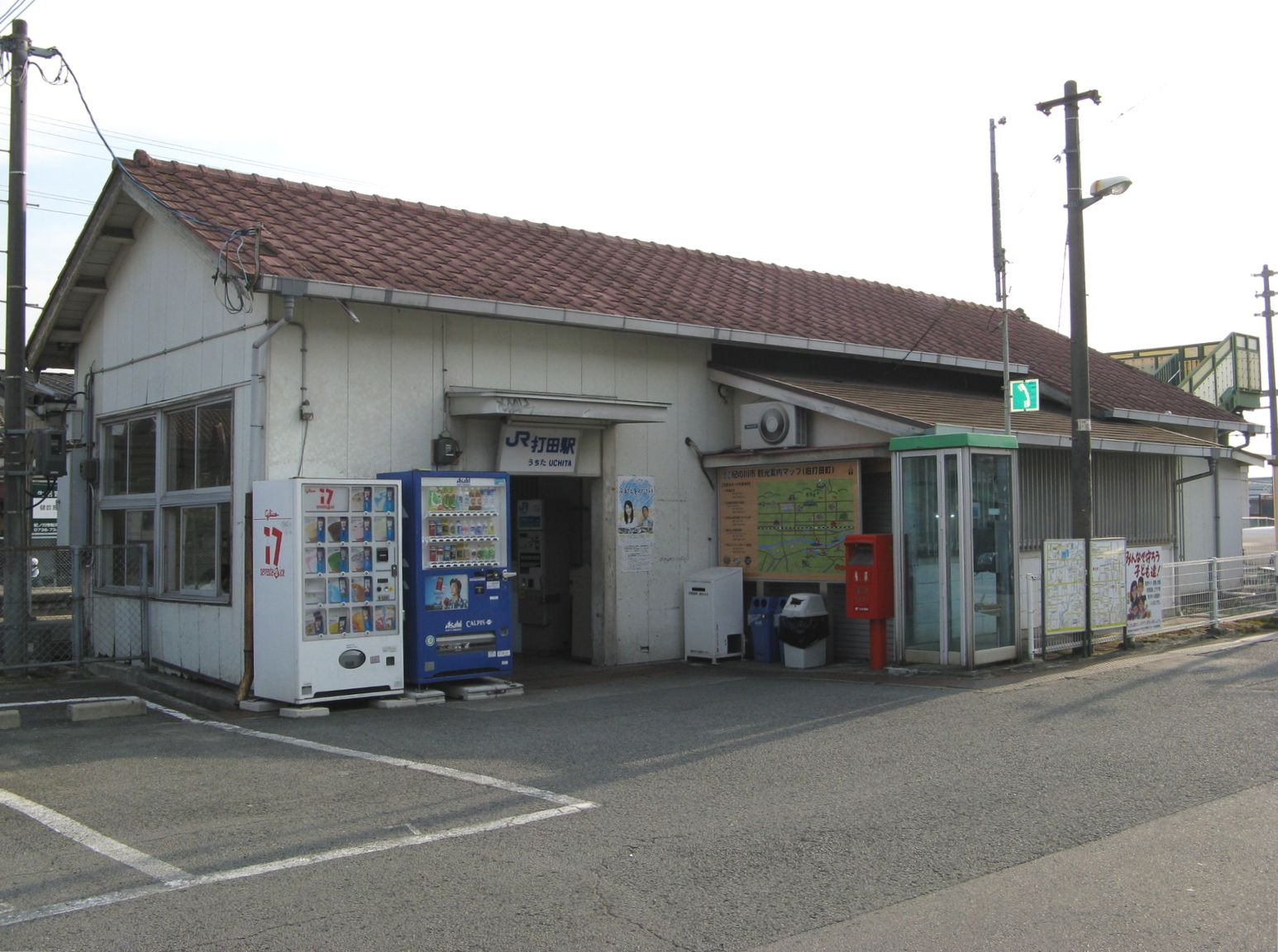
- Uchita Station, September 2008

General information
- Location: 1241-2, Uchita-chō, Kinokawa-shi, Wakayama-ken 649-6414; Japan
- Coordinates: 34.2658°N 135.3641°E
- Owner: West Japan Railway Company
- Operator: West Japan Railway Company
- Line: T Wakayama Line
- Distance: 69.8 km (43.4 miles) from Ōji
- Platforms: 2 side platforms
- Tracks: 2
- Train operators: West Japan Railway Company

Other information
- Status: Staffed
- Website: Official website

History
- Opened: 24 August 1900

Passengers
- FY2019: 589 daily
Services
Preceding station	JR-West	Following station
Wakayama Line
Kokawa	Rapid Service	Iwade
Kii-Nagata	Local	Shimoisaka
Location
- Location within Wakayama Prefecture Location within Japan

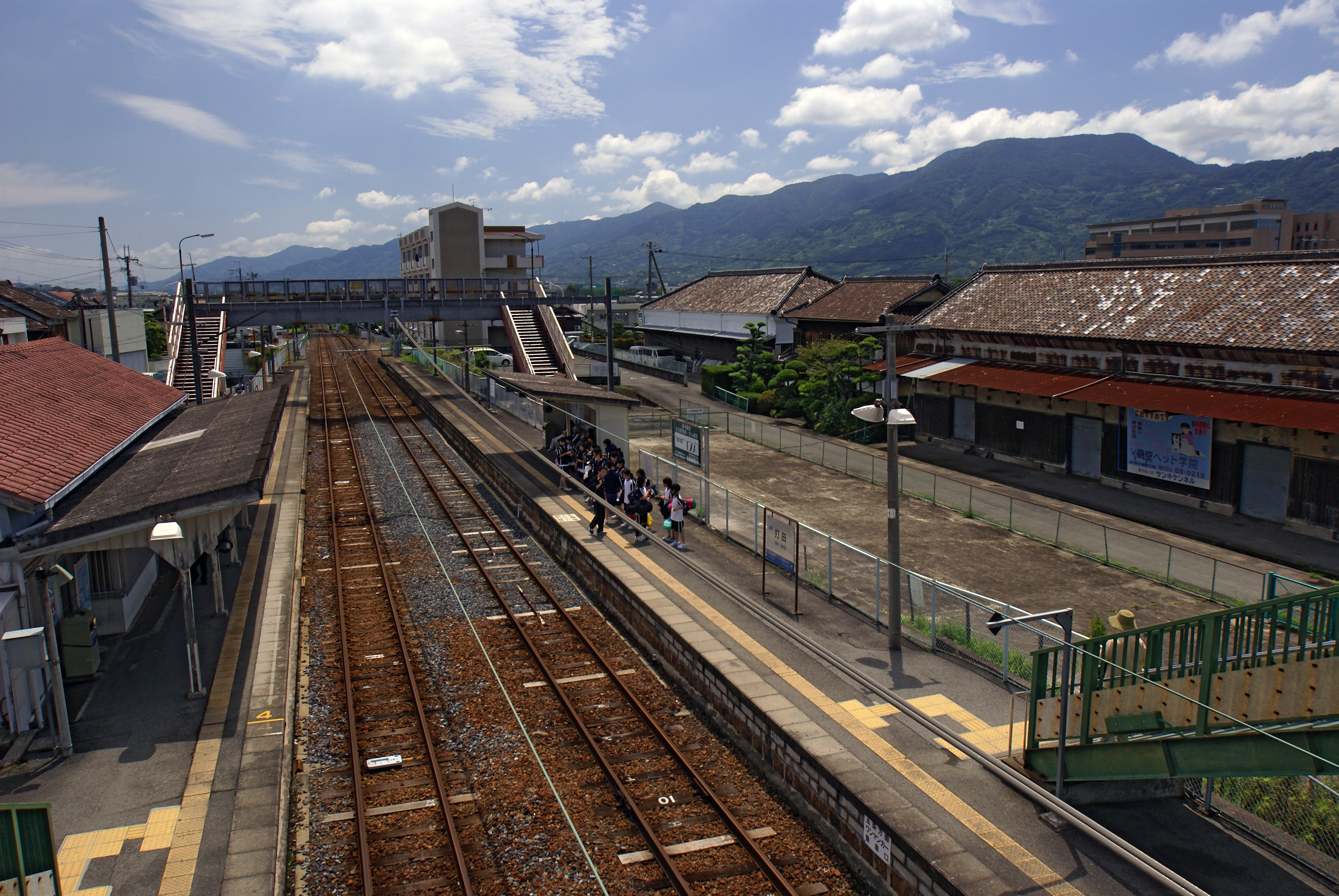
Uchita Station platform, June 2007

Uchita Station (打田駅, Uchita-eki) is a passenger railway station in located in the city of Kinokawa, Wakayama Prefecture, Japan, operated by West Japan Railway Company (JR West).

== Lines ==
Uchita Station is served by the Wakayama Line, and is located 69.8 kilometers from the terminus of the line at Ōji Station.

== Station layout ==
The station consists of two opposed side platforms connected to the station building by a footbridge. The station is unattended.

=== Platforms ===
1	■ T Wakayama Line	for Kokawa and Hashimoto
2	■ T Wakayama Line	for Wakayama

== Adjacent stations ==
«	Service	»
Wakayama Line
Kokawa	Rapid Service	Iwade
Kii-Nagata	Local	Shimoisaka

== History ==
Uchita Station opened on August 24, 1900 on the Kiwa Railway. The line was sold to the Kansai Railway in 1904, which was subsequently nationalized in 1907. With the privatization of the Japan National Railways (JNR) on April 1, 1987, the station came under the aegis of the West Japan Railway Company.

== Passenger statistics ==
In fiscal 2019, the station was used by an average of 589 passengers daily (boarding passengers only).

== Surrounding Area ==
- Kinokawa City Hall (former Uchita Town Hall)
- Kinokawa City Uchida Junior High School

== See also ==
- List of railway stations in Japan
