= Kii-Nagata Station =

Railway station in Kinokawa, Wakayama Prefecture, Japan

Kii-Nagata Station 紀伊長田駅
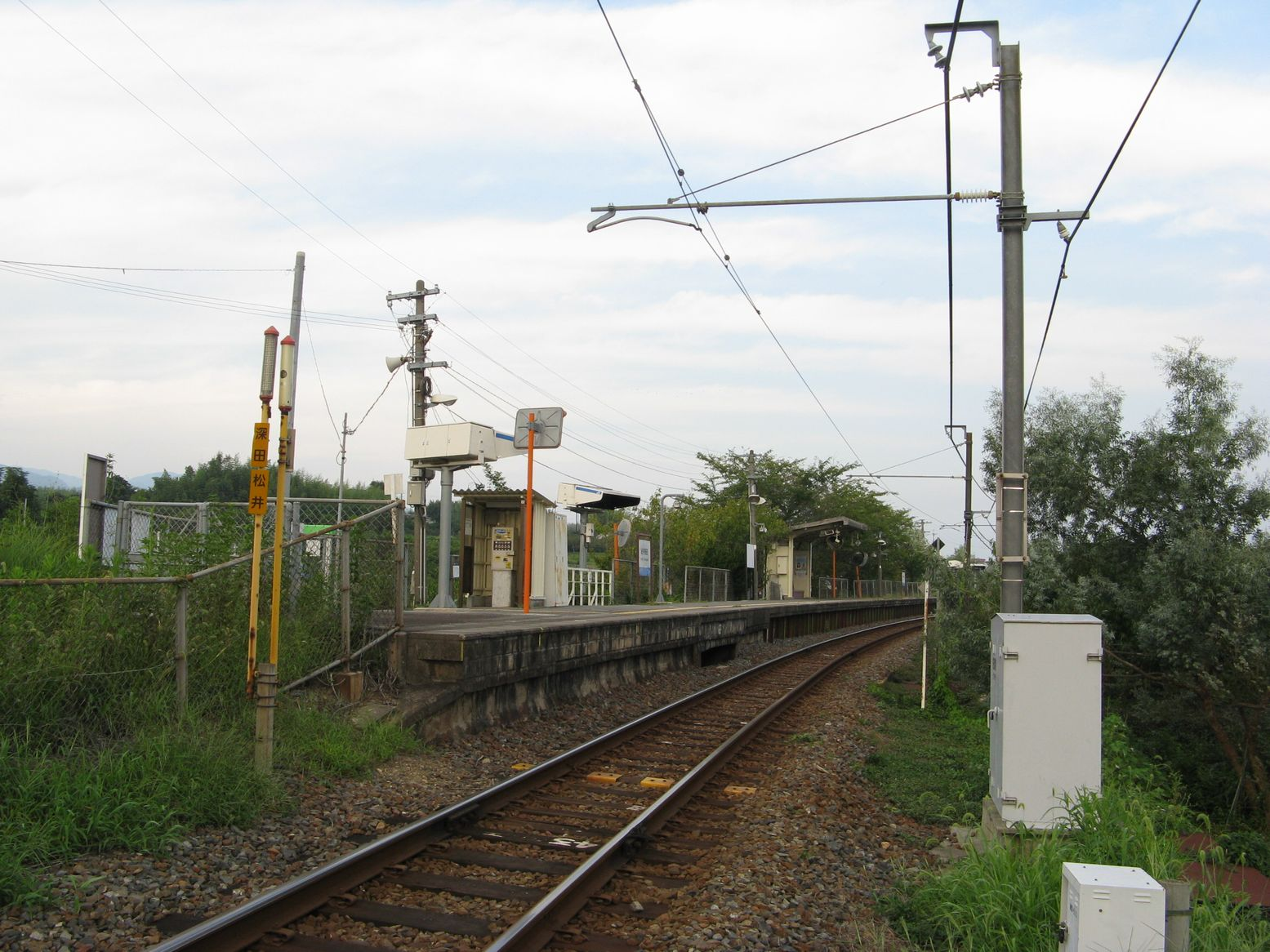
- Kii-Nagata Station, September 2008

General information
- Location: 551-1 Shimoisaka-chō Imou, Kinokawa-shi, Wakayama-ken 649-6426; Japan
- Coordinates: 34.2681°N 135.3916°E
- System: JR-West commuter rail station
- Owner: West Japan Railway Company
- Operator: West Japan Railway Company
- Line: T Wakayama Line
- Distance: 67.20 km (41.76 miles) from Ōji
- Platforms: 1 side platform
- Tracks: 1
- Train operators: West Japan Railway Company

Other information
- Status: Unstaffed
- Website: Official website

History
- Opened: 7 March 1903

Passengers
- FY2019: 100 daily
Services
Preceding station	JR-West	Following station
Wakayama Line
Rapid Service: Does not stop at this station
Kokawa	Local	Uchita
Location
- Location within Wakayama Prefecture Location within Japan

Kii-Nagata Station (紀伊長田駅, Kii-Nagata-eki) is a passenger railway station located in the city of Kinokawa, Wakayama Prefecture, Japan, operated by the West Japan Railway Company (JR West).

== Lines ==
Kii-Nagata Station is served by the Wakayama Line, and is located 67.2 kilometers from the terminus of the line at Ōji Station.

== Station layout ==
The station consists of one side platform serving a single bi-directional track. There is no station building, but only a weather shelter on the platform. The station is unattended.

== Adjacent stations ==
«	Service	»
Wakayama Line
Rapid Service: Does not stop at this station
Kokawa	Local	Uchita

== History ==
Kii-Nagata Station opened on March 7, 1903 as the Nagata Temporary Stop (長田臨時停車場, Nagata rinji teishaba) on the Kiwa Railway. The line was sold to the Kansai Railway in 1904, which was subsequently nationalized in 1907. The station was renamed to the Nagata Provisional Stop (長田仮停車場, Nagata kari teishaba) on February 22, 1908. It became a full station on July 15, 1938, but was closed from August 10, 1941 to September 23, 1952. With the privatization of the Japan National Railways (JNR) on April 1, 1987, the station came under the aegis of the West Japan Railway Company.

== Passenger statistics ==
In fiscal 2019, the station was used by an average of 100 passengers daily (boarding passengers only).

== Surrounding Area ==
- Kannon-ji (Nagata Kannon)

== See also ==
- List of railway stations in Japan
