= Wakayama Prefecture Botanical Park =

Park with botanical garden located at Wakayama, Japan

Coordinates: 34°17′09″N 135°19′38″E

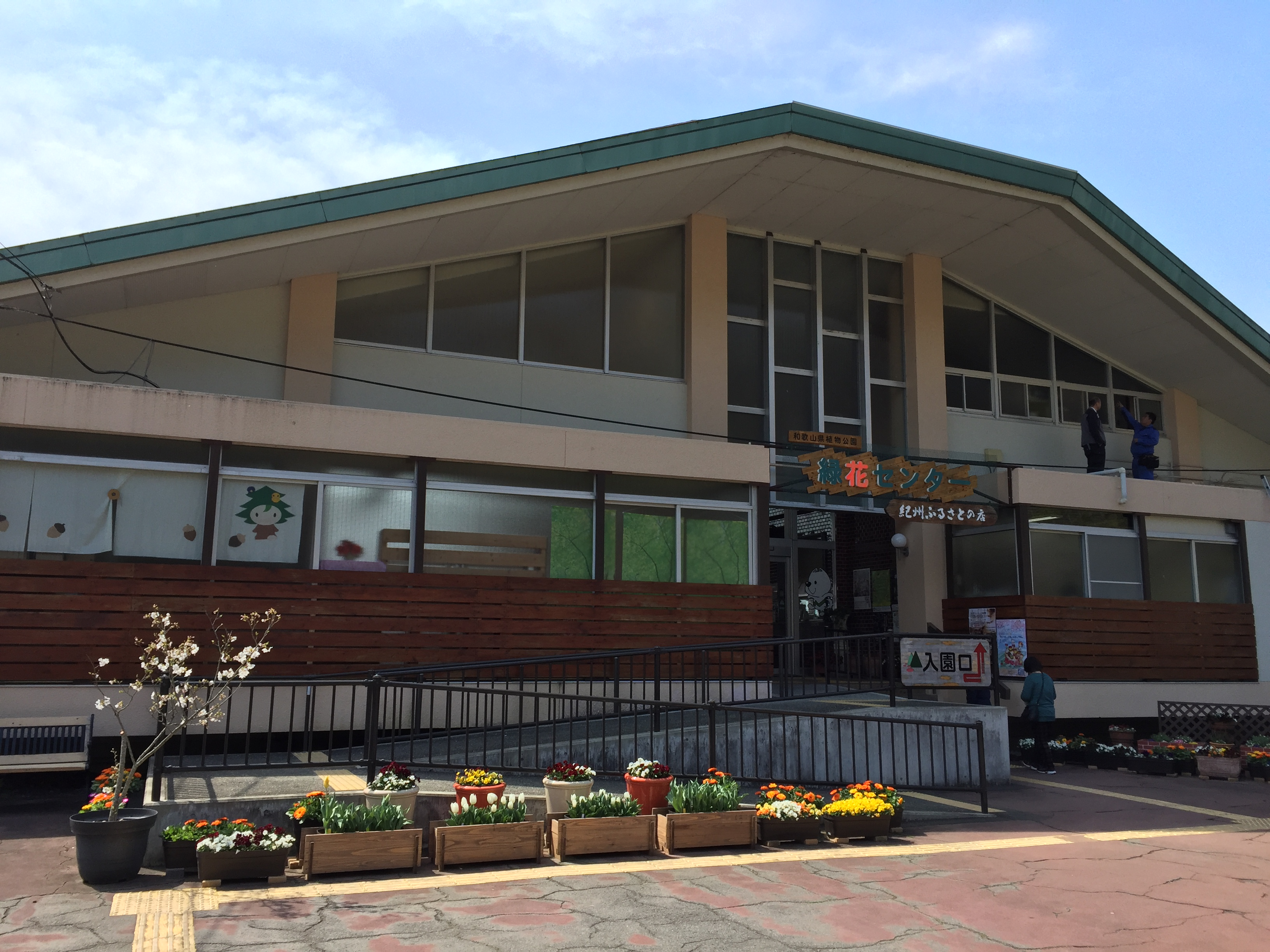
Wakayama Prefecture Botanical Park

The Wakayama Prefecture Botanical Park (和歌山県植物公園緑花センター, Wakayama-ken Shokubutsu Kōen Ryokka Sentā) is a park with botanical garden located at Higashi Sakamoto 672, Iwade, Wakayama, Japan. It is open daily except Tuesdays; an admission fee is charged.

The park contains a large tropical greenhouse (fruit trees, bougainvillea, strelitzia, etc.); additional greenhouses for begonia, cactus (about 140 species), and orchid (Cattleya, Cymbidium, and Paphiopedilum); extensive flower plantings; a lotus pond (3,000 m^{2}); and collections of camellia (2,000 m^{2}, 80 varieties), hydrangea (2,000 m^{2}, 75 varieties, including 35 Japanese varieties), medicinal plants (600 m^{2}), and plum trees (1,000 m^{2}, 33 varieties).

== See also ==
- List of botanical gardens in Japan
