= Iwade Station =

Railway station in Iwade, Wakayama Prefecture, Japan

Iwade Station 岩出駅
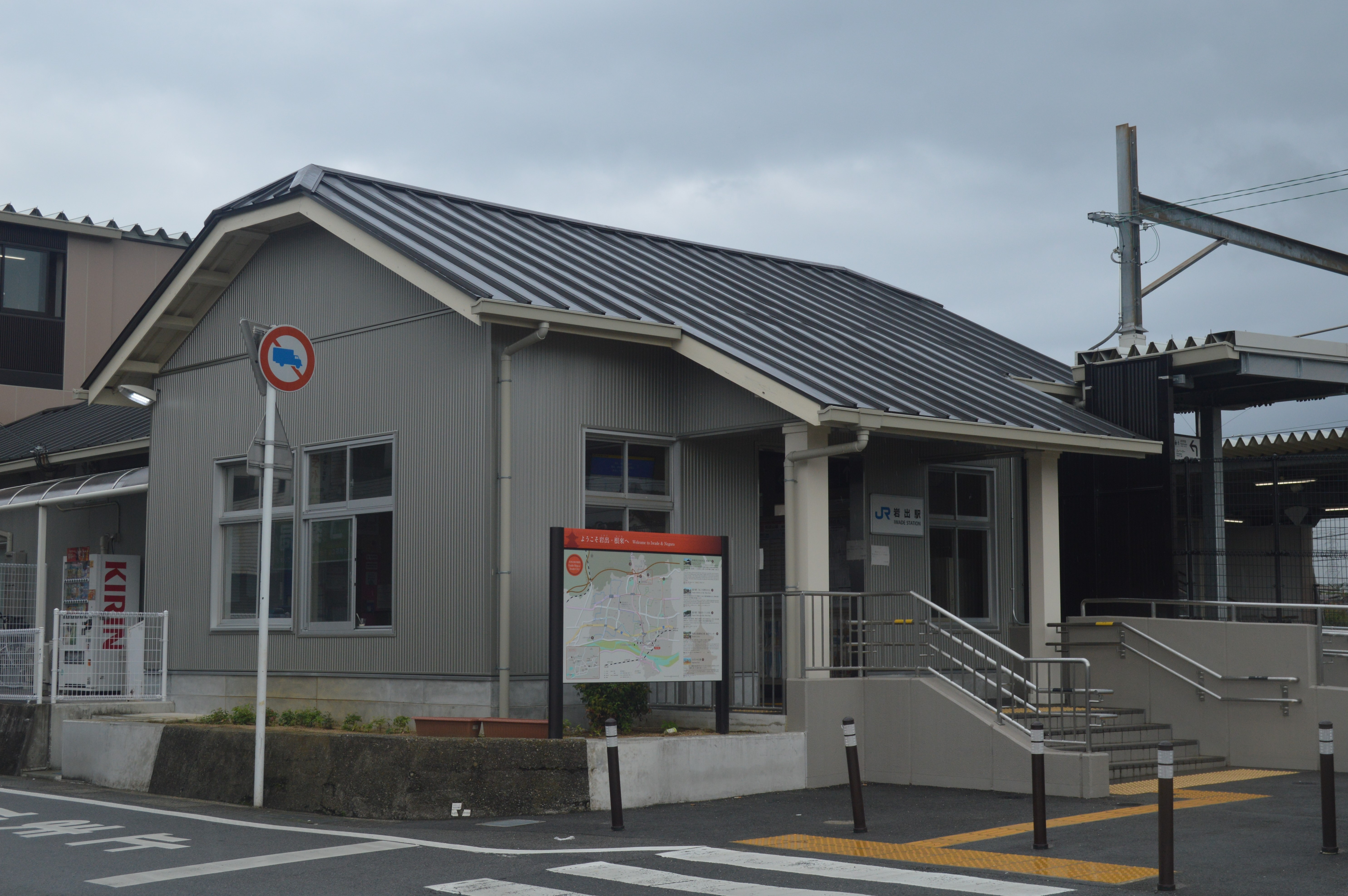
- Iwade Station, September 2021

General information
- Location: 48-2 Takatsuka, Iwade-shi, Wakayama-ken 649-6223; Japan
- Coordinates: 34.2548°N 135.3212°E
- System: JR-West commuter rail station
- Owner: West Japan Railway Company
- Operator: West Japan Railway Company
- Line: T Wakayama Line
- Distance: 74.2 km (46.1 miles) from Ōji
- Platforms: 2 side platforms
- Tracks: 2
- Train operators: West Japan Railway Company

Other information
- Status: Staffed (Midori no Madoguchi )
- Website: Official website

History
- Opened: 10 October 1901
- Former names: Ōmiya (to 1902)

Passengers
- FY2019: 1891 daily
Services
Preceding station	JR-West	Following station
Wakayama Line
Uchita	Rapid Service	Wakayama
Shimoisaka	Local	Funato
Location
- Location within Wakayama Prefecture Location within Japan

Iwade Station (岩出駅, Iwade-eki) is a passenger railway station in located in the city of Iwade, Wakayama Prefecture, Japan, operated by West Japan Railway Company (JR West).

== Lines ==
Iwade Station is served by the Wakayama Line, and is located 74.2 kilometers from the terminus of the line at Ōji Station.

== Station layout ==
The station consists of two opposed side platforms connected by a footbridge. The station has a Midori no Madoguchi staffed ticket office.

=== Platforms ===
1	■ T Wakayama Line	for Kokawa and Hashimoto
2	■ T Wakayama Line	for Wakayama

== Adjacent stations ==
«	Service	»
Wakayama Line
Uchita	Rapid Service	Wakayama
Shimoisaka	Local	Funato

== History ==
Iwade Station opened on October 10, 1901 on the Kiwa Railway as the Ōmiya Provisional Station (大宮仮停車場, Ōmiya kariteishajō). It was promoted to a full station and renamed Ōmiya Station (大宮駅, Ōmiya eki) on March 1, 1902, and renamed to its present name a month later. The line was sold to the Kansai Railway in 1904, which was subsequently nationalized in 1907. With the privatization of the Japan National Railways (JNR) on April 1, 1987, the station came under the aegis of the West Japan Railway Company.

== Passenger statistics ==
In fiscal 2019, the station was used by an average of 1891 passengers daily (boarding passengers only).

== Surrounding Area ==
- Iwade City Hall
- Ōmiya Shrine
- Wakayama Prefectural Naga High Schoole

== See also ==
- List of railway stations in Japan
