= Kii-Ogura Station =

Railway station in Wakayama, Wakayama Prefecture, Japan

Kii-Ogura Station 紀伊小倉駅
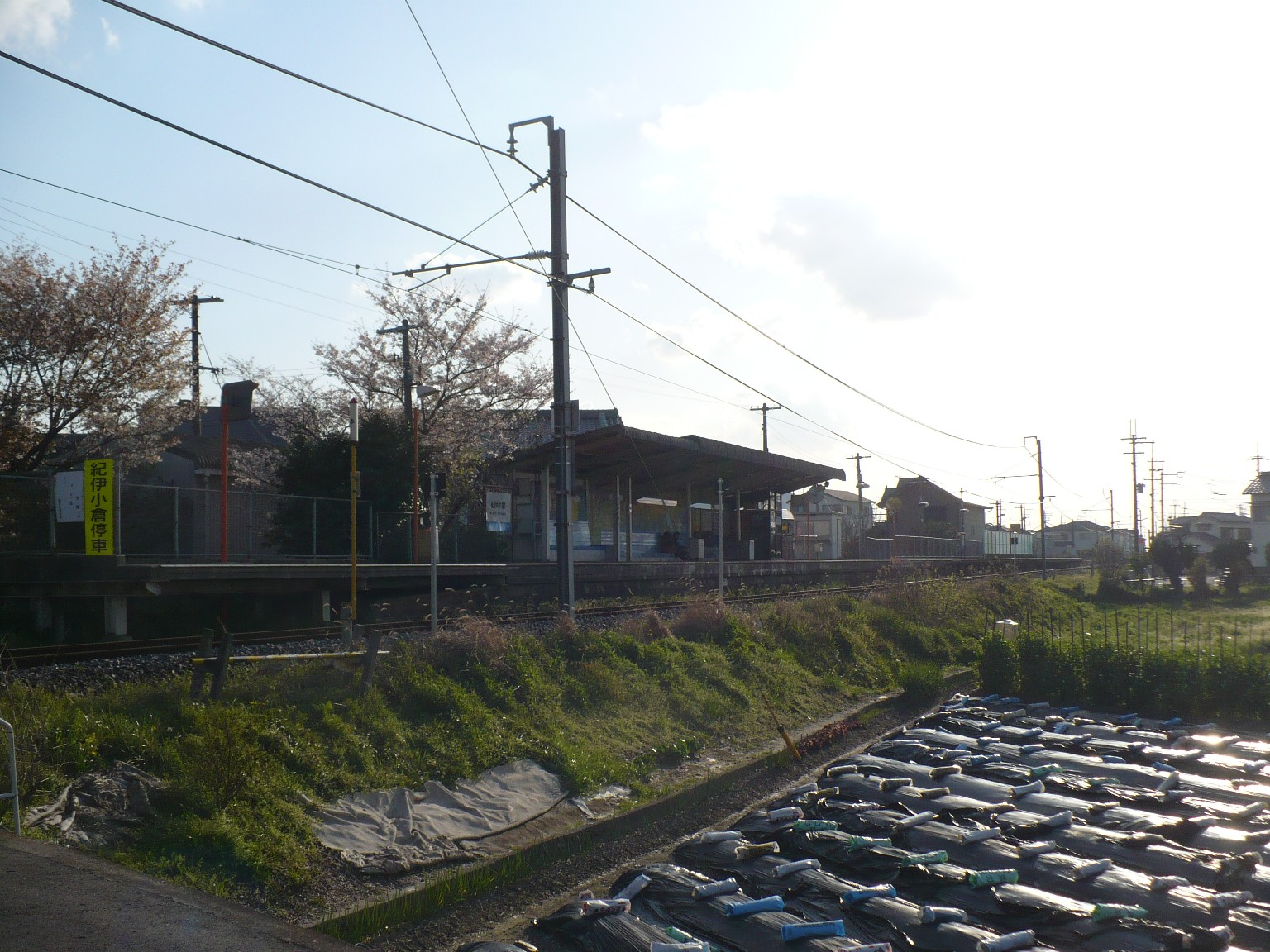
- Kii-Ogura Station platform, April 2010

General information
- Location: 482-1 Shinjo, Wakayama-shi, Wakayama-ken 649-6264; Japan
- Coordinates: 34.2464°N 135.2871°E
- Owner: West Japan Railway Company
- Operator: West Japan Railway Company
- Line: T Wakayama Line
- Distance: 77.6 km (48.2 miles) from Ōji
- Platforms: 1 side platforms
- Tracks: 1
- Train operators: West Japan Railway Company

Other information
- Status: Unstaffed
- Website: Official website

History
- Opened: 15 July 1938

Passengers
- FY2019: 614 daily
Services
Preceding station	JR-West	Following station
Wakayama Line
Rapid Service: Does not stop at this station
Funato	Local	Hoshiya
Location
- Location within Wakayama Prefecture Location within Japan

Kii-Ogura Station (紀伊小倉駅, Kii-Ogura-eki) is a passenger railway station in located in the city of Wakayama, Wakayama Prefecture, Japan, operated by West Japan Railway Company (JR West).

== Lines ==
Kii-Ogura Station is served by the Wakayama Line, and is located 77.6 kilometers from the terminus of the line at Ōji Station.

== Station layout ==
The station consists of one side platform serving a single bi-directional track. The station is unattended.

== Adjacent stations ==
«	Service	»
Wakayama Line
Rapid Service: Does not stop at this station
Funato	Local	Hoshiya

== History ==
Kii-Ogura Station opened on July 15, 1938. With the privatization of the Japan National Railways (JNR) on April 1, 1987, the station came under the aegis of the West Japan Railway Company.

== Passenger statistics ==
In fiscal 2019, the station was used by an average of 614 passengers daily (boarding passengers only).

== Surrounding Area ==
- Wakayama City Hall Ogura Branch
- Wakayama Prefectural Wakayama High School
- Wakayama City Ogura Elementary School
- Wakayama Prefectural Industrial Technology Center
- Wakayama Prefectural Wakayama Industrial Technology College

== See also ==
- List of railway stations in Japan
