= Kinokawa River =

River in Japan

Kinokawa River Kino River, Yoshino River
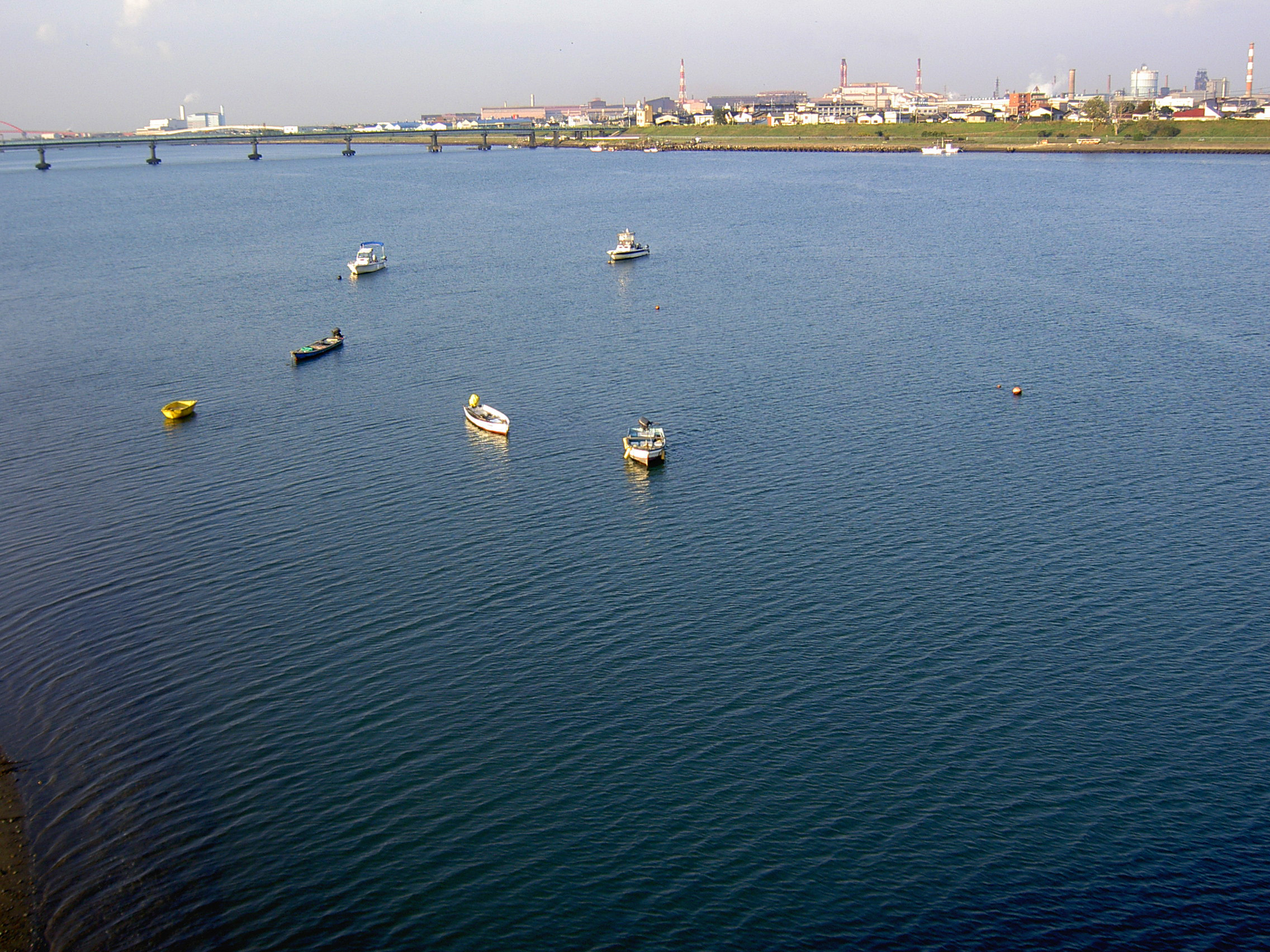
- The Kinokawa in Wakayama city.

- Location within Japan
- Native name: 紀ノ川 (Japanese); 紀の川 (Japanese); 吉野川 (Japanese)

Physical characteristics
- Source
  - location: Mount Ōdaigahara
- Mouth
  - location: Kii Channel
  - coordinates: 34.2220453°N 135.1279644°E,
  - elevation: 0 m (0 ft)
- Length: 136 km (85 mi)
- Basin size: 1,660 km^{2} (640 mi^{2})

The Kinokawa or redundantly Kinokawa River (紀ノ川 or 紀の川, Kinokawa) is a Class A river in Nara and Wakayama Prefecture in Japan. It is called Yoshino River (吉野川, Yoshinogawa) in Nara. It is 136 kilometres (85 mi) long and has a watershed of 1,660 square kilometres (640 mi^{2}).

The river flows from Mount Ōdaigahara to the west. It pours into Kii Channel at Wakayama city.

== Geography ==
The boundary between Nara prefecture and Mie prefecture is designated as the site where the river originates. The rainy season helped to create an Alluvial plain. The course of the river often changes, with frequent floods.

== Railroad ==
The JR West Wakayama Line partly runs parallel with the river.

== History ==
Abundant water was useful for human settlement.

It was an area where the Koyasan, Kokawa and Mitsui temples were strong; centralized rule was impossible, until Nobunaga Oda suppressed the Saika Ikki.

The novelist Sawako Ariyoshi titled one of her books after the river.
