= Kokawa Station =

Railway station in Kinokawa, Wakayama Prefecture, Japan

Kokawa Station 粉河駅
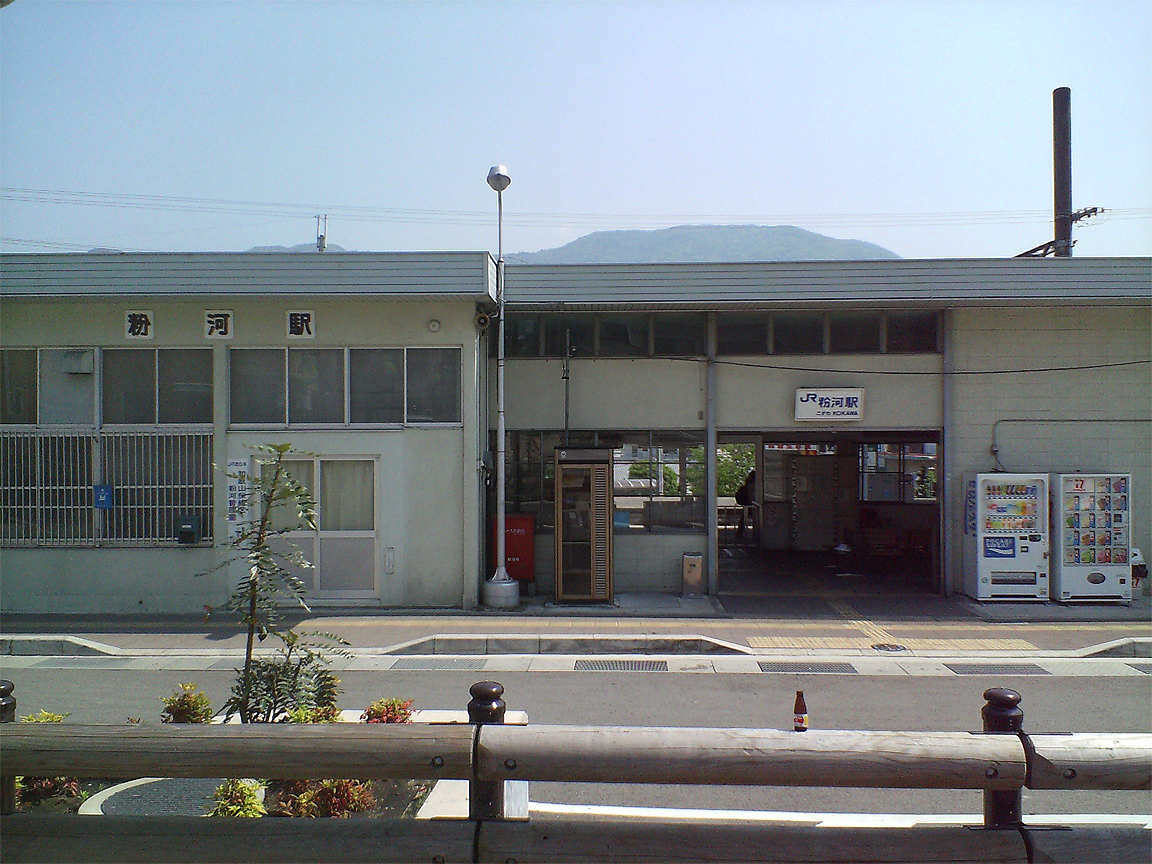
- Kokawa Station, May 2008

General information
- Location: 870 Kokawa, Kinokawa-shi, Wakayama-ken 649-6531; Japan
- Coordinates: 34.2710°N 135.4042°E
- Owner: West Japan Railway Company
- Operator: West Japan Railway Company
- Line: T Wakayama Line
- Distance: 66.0 km (41.0 miles) from Ōji
- Platforms: 1 side + 1 island platforms
- Tracks: 3
- Train operators: West Japan Railway Company

Other information
- Status: Unstaffed station (automatic ticket vending machine installed)
- Website: Official website

History
- Opened: 25 November 1900

Passengers
- FY2019: 976 daily
Services
Preceding station	JR-West	Following station
Wakayama Line
Nate	Rapid Service	Uchita
Nate	Local	Kii-Nagata
Location
- Location within Wakayama Prefecture Location within Japan

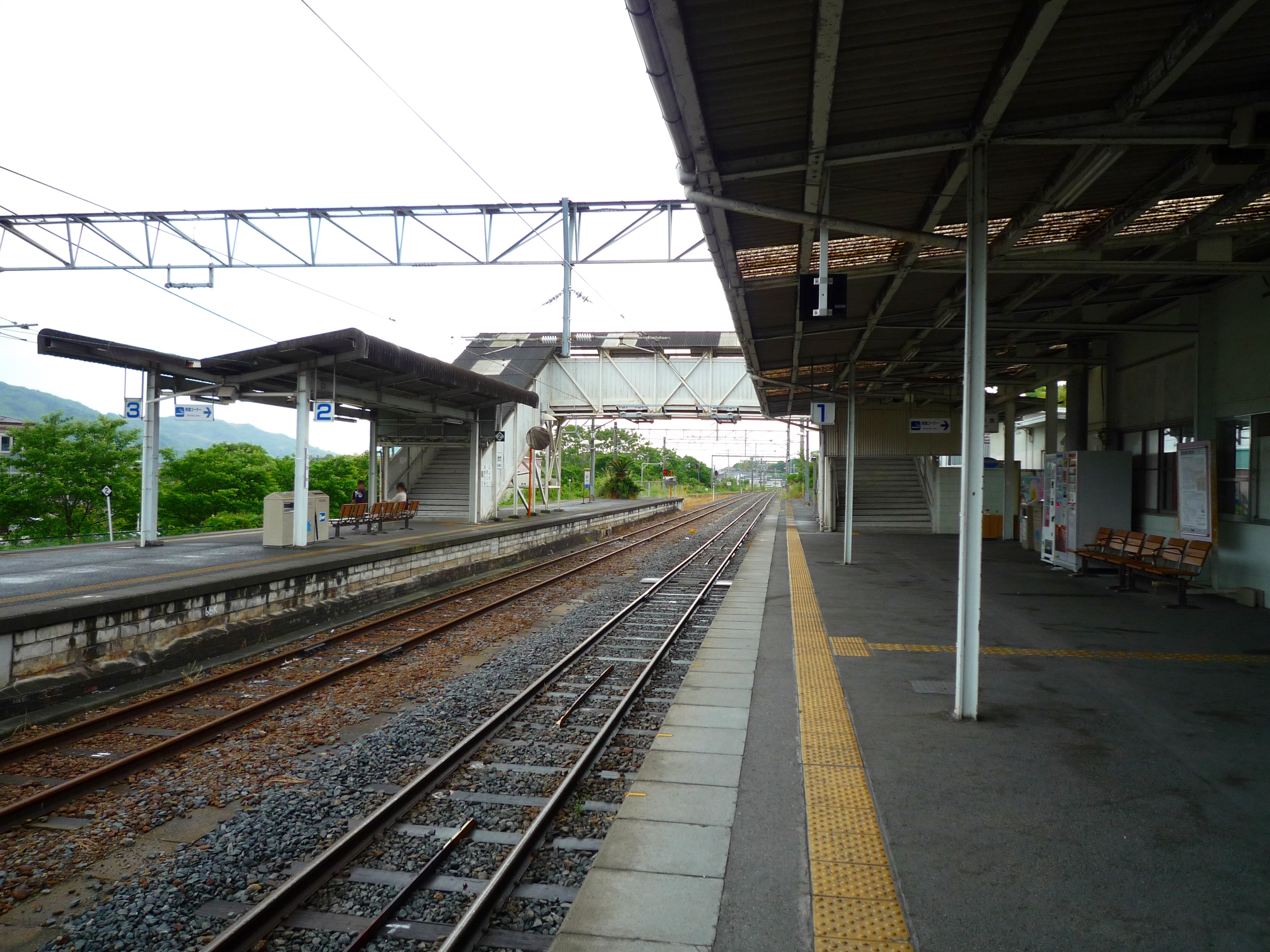
Platform

Kokawa Station (粉河駅, Kokawa-eki) is a passenger railway station in located in the city of Kinokawa, Wakayama Prefecture, Japan, operated by West Japan Railway Company (JR West).

== Lines ==
Kokawa Station is served by the Wakayama Line, and is located 66.0 kilometers from the terminus of the line at Ōji Station.

== Station layout ==
The station consists of one island platform and one side platforms connected to the station building by a footbridge. The station is unstaffed, but has automatic ticket vending machines.

=== Platforms ===
1	■ T Wakayama Line	for Hashimoto and Gojō
2	■ T Wakayama Line	for Hashimoto and Gojō for Wakayama
3	■ T Wakayama Line	for Wakayama

== Adjacent stations ==
«	Service	»
Wakayama Line
Nate	Rapid Service	Uchita
Nate	Local	Kii-Nagata

== History ==
Kokawa Station opened on November 25, 1900 on the Kiwa Railway. The line was sold to the Kansai Railway in 1904, which was subsequently nationalized in 1907. With the privatization of the Japan National Railways (JNR) on April 1, 1987, the station came under the aegis of the West Japan Railway Company.

== Passenger statistics ==
In fiscal 2019, the station was used by an average of 976 passengers daily (boarding passengers only).

== Surrounding Area ==
- Kokawa-dera temple (No.3 on the Saigoku Kannon Pilgrimage)
- Kinokawa City Hall Kokawa Branch (formerly Kokawa Town Hall)
- Wakayama Prefectural Kokawa High School
- Kinokawa Municipal Kokawa Junior High School

== See also ==
- List of railway stations in Japan
