= Wakayama Line =

Railway line in Japan

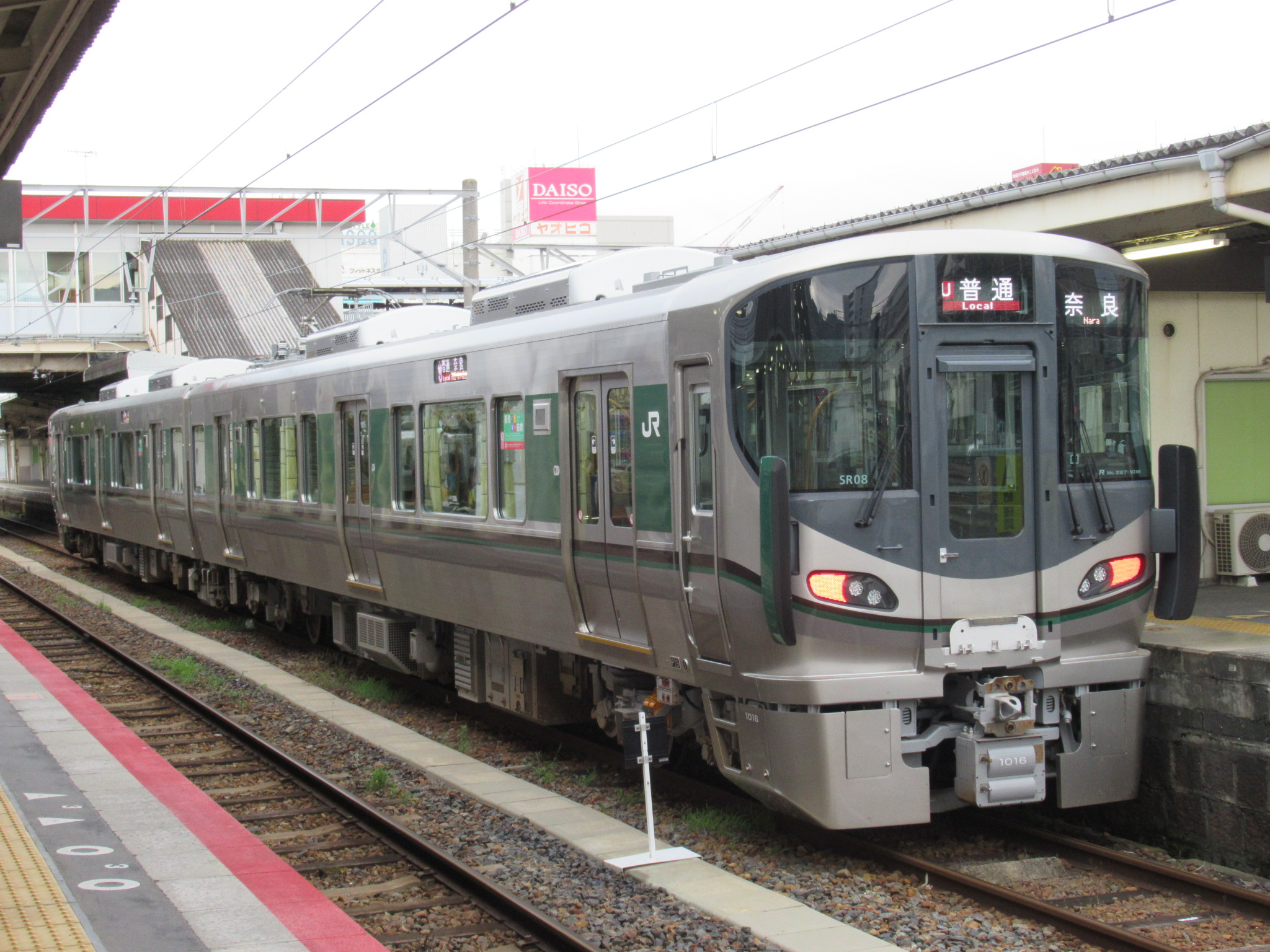
- 227-1000 series at Ōji Station

Overview
- Locale: Nara, Wakayama prefectures
- Termini: Ōji; Wakayama
- Stations: 36

Service
- Type: Heavy rail
- Operator(s): JR West
- Rolling stock: 201 series, 221 series, 227-1000 series EMUs

History
- Opened: 1896; 130 years ago

Technical
- Line length: 87.5 km (54.4 mi)
- Number of tracks: Fully single-track
- Track gauge: 1,067 mm (3 ft 6 in)
- Electrification: 1,500 V DC (overhead catenary)
- Operating speed: 85 km/h (53 mph)
- Signalling: Automatic closed block
- Train protection system: ATS-SW

The Wakayama Line (和歌山線, Wakayama-sen) is a railway line that links Nara Prefecture to Wakayama Prefecture, both in the Kansai region of Japan, operated by West Japan Railway Company (JR West). It connects Ōji Station on the Yamatoji Line to Wakayama Station on the Hanwa Line and Kisei Main Line, with through train service to JR Namba via the Yamatoji Line and to Nara via the Sakurai Line.

== Stations ==
Station	Japanese	Distance (km)	Rapid (orange)	Transfers	Location	
Ōji	王寺	0.0		Q Yamatoji Line (Q31); G Kintetsu Ikoma Line (G28); I Kintetsu Tawaramoto Line (I43:Shin-Ōji)	Oji, Kitakatsuragi District	Nara
Hatakeda	畠田	2.6			Oji, Kitakatsuragi District	Nara
Shizumi	志都美	4.5			Kashiba	Nara
Kashiba	香芝	6.6		D Kintetsu Osaka Line (D22:Kintetsu Shimoda)	Kashiba	Nara
JR Goidō	JR五位堂	8.7			Kashiba	Nara
Takada	高田	11.5		U Man-yō Mahoroba Line (Sakurai Line); D Kintetsu Osaka Line (D25:Yamato-Takada)	Yamatotakada	Nara
Yamato-Shinjō	大和新庄	14.9			Katsuragi	Nara
Gose	御所	17.6		P Kintetsu Gose Line (P26: Kintetsu Gose)	Gose	Nara
Tamade	玉手	19.4			Gose	Nara
Wakigami	掖上	20.9			Gose	Nara
Yoshinoguchi	吉野口	24.9		F Kintetsu Yoshino Line (F48)	Gose	Nara
Kitauchi	北宇智	31.5			Gojō	Nara
Gojō	五条	35.4	●		Gojō	Nara
Yamato-Futami	大和二見	37.1	●		Gojō	Nara
Suda	隅田	41.1	●		Hashimoto	Wakayama
Shimohyōgo	下兵庫	43.2	●		Hashimoto	Wakayama
Hashimoto	橋本	45.1	●	Nankai Koya Line (NK77)	Hashimoto	Wakayama
Kii-Yamada	紀伊山田	48.0	●		Hashimoto	Wakayama
Kōyaguchi	高野口	50.6	●		Hashimoto	Wakayama
Nakaiburi	中飯降	53.0	●		Katsuragi, Ito District	Wakayama
Myōji	妙寺	54.6	●		Katsuragi, Ito District	Wakayama
Ōtani	大谷	56.7	●		Katsuragi, Ito District	Wakayama
Kaseda	笠田	58.2	●		Katsuragi, Ito District	Wakayama
Nishi-Kaseda	西笠田	61.3	●		Katsuragi, Ito District	Wakayama
Nate	名手	63.2	●		Kinokawa	Wakayama
Kokawa	粉河	66.0	●		Kinokawa	Wakayama
Kii-Nagata	紀伊長田	67.2	｜		Kinokawa	Wakayama
Uchita	打田	69.8	●		Kinokawa	Wakayama
Shimoisaka	下井阪	72.0	｜		Kinokawa	Wakayama
Iwade	岩出	74.2	●		Iwade	Wakayama
Funato	船戸	75.3	｜		Iwade	Wakayama
Kii-Ogura	紀伊小倉	77.6	｜		Wakayama	Wakayama
Hoshiya	布施屋	79.9	｜		Wakayama	Wakayama
Senda	千旦	81.4	｜		Wakayama	Wakayama
Tainose	田井ノ瀬	82.9	｜		Wakayama	Wakayama
Wakayama	和歌山	87.5	●	R Hanwa Line (R54); W Kinokuni Line; Wakayama Electric Railway Kishigawa Line (01)	Wakayama	Wakayama

== Rolling stock ==
- 227 series (from Spring 2019, with through services to the Sakurai Line)
- 221 series (only through rapid services to JR Namba via the Yamatoji Line)

=== Former rolling stocks ===
- 103 series (until 2018)
- 105 series (until 2020)
- 117 series (until 2020)
- 201 series ( some through rapid services to JR Namba via the Yamatoji Line until 2025)

== History ==
The section between Oji and Takada was opened in 1891 by the Osaka Railway. The Minami Kazu Railway opened the Takada to Yoshinoguchi section in 1896, and extended the line to Gojo in 1898. The same year the Kiwa Railway opened the Gojo-to-Hashimoto section, extending it to Wakayama in 1900, the year the Osaka Railway merged with the Kansai Railway.

The line was electrified in 1980.

== See also ==
- List of railway lines in Japan
