= 221 series =

Japanese train type

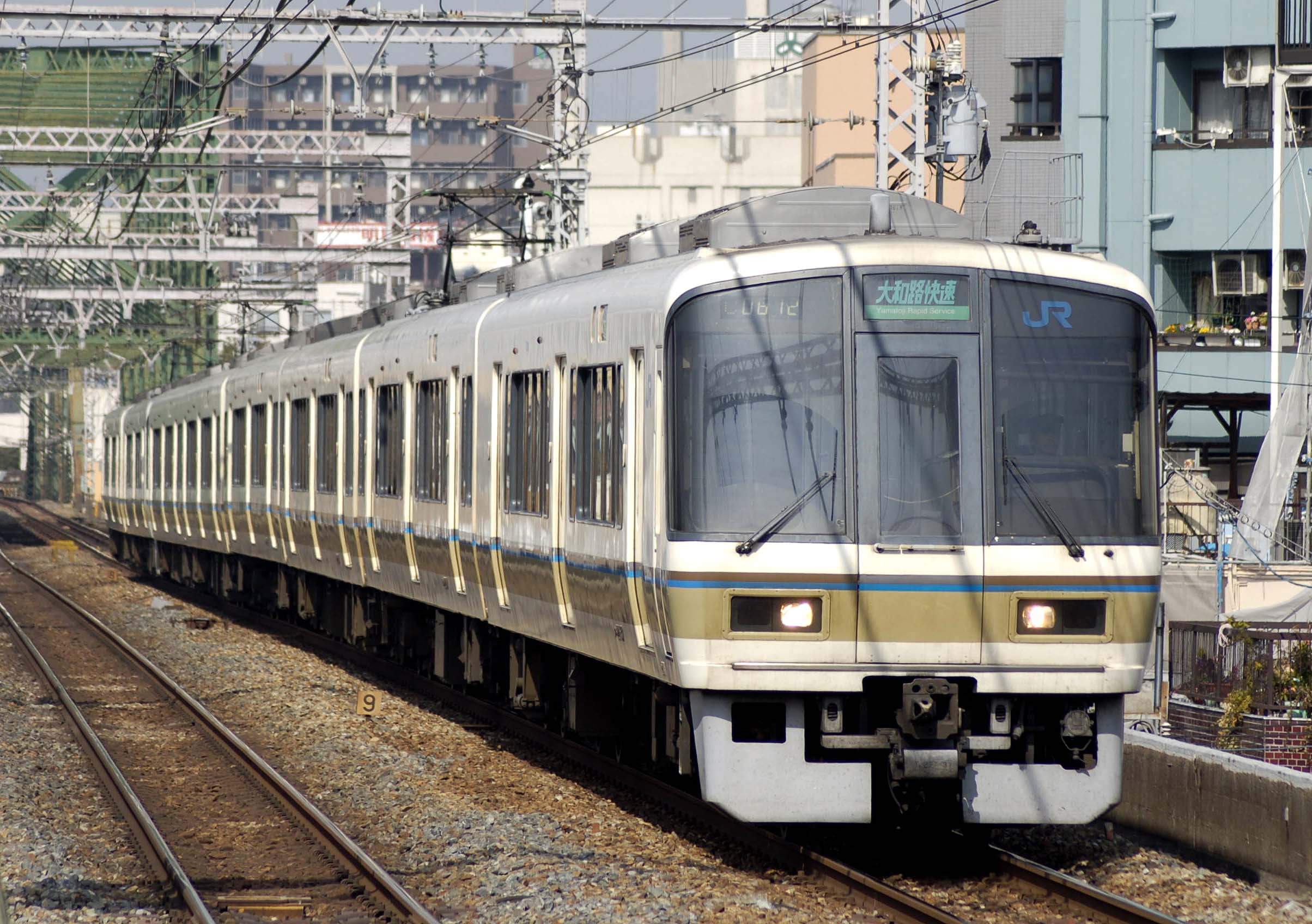
- A 221 series formation in March 2008
- Manufacturers: JR-West Gotō Works; JR-West Takatori Works; Hitachi; Kawasaki Heavy Industries; Kinki Sharyo
- Built at: Kobe, Yonago, Kudamatsu, Higashiōsaka
- Family name: Amenity Liner
- Replaced: 113 series, 117 series, 201 series
- Constructed: 1989–1992
- Entered service: 6 March 1989
- Refurbished: 2012–2020
- Number built: 474 vehicles
- Number in service: 474 vehicles
- Formation: 2/4/6/8 cars per trainset
- Operator: JR-West
- Depots: Aboshi, Nara, Kyoto
- Lines served: A Tōkaidō Main Line; A Sanyō Main Line; A Hokuriku Main Line; A Akō Line; B Kosei Line; J Bantan Line; E San'in Main Line; O Osaka Loop Line; F Osaka Higashi Line; D Nara Line; Q Yamatoji Line; T Wakayama Line; U Sakurai Line

Specifications
- Car body construction: Steel
- Car length: 20,000 mm (65 ft 7 in)
- Width: 2,950 mm (9 ft 8 in)
- Doors: 3 pairs per side
- Maximum speed: 120 km/h (75 mph)
- Traction system: Resistor control + field system superimposed field excitation control
- Traction motors: WMT61S; WMT64S
- Electric system: 1,500 V DC overhead line
- Current collection: WPS27 scissors-type pantograph
- Braking systems: Regenerative brake, electronically controlled pneumatic brakes, snow-resistant brake
- Safety systems: ATS-P, ATS-SW
- Coupling system: Shibata-Type
- Multiple working: 223/225 series
- Track gauge: 1,067 mm (3 ft 6 in)

The 221 series (221系, 221-kei) is a suburban electric multiple unit (EMU) train type operated by West Japan Railway Company (JR-West) in the Kansai Region of Japan since March 1989.

== Operations ==
- Tōkaidō Main Line (Biwako Line, JR Kyoto Line, JR Kobe Line) (Maibara - Kōbe, until 2023)
- Sanyō Main Line (JR Kobe Line) (Kōbe - Kamigōri, until 2023)
- Hokuriku Main Line (Biwako Line) (Nagahama - Maibara, until 2023)
- Kosei Line (Yamashina - Ōmi-Imazu)
- Osaka Loop Line (only on Rapid service, Regional Rapid service and Local train)
- Osaka Higashi Line (from 12 March 2022)
- Kansai Main Line (Yamatoji Line) (Kamo - JR Namba)
- Nara Line
- Sakurai Line (Manyō-Mahoroba Line)
- Wakayama Line (Ōji - Gojō)
- Akō Line (Aioi - Banshū-Akō, until 2023)
- Sanin Main Line (Sagano Line) (Kyoto - Fukuchiyama)
- Bantan Line (Himeji - Teramae, until 2023)

== Formations ==
As of 1 October 2012, the fleet consisted of 474 vehicles, formed as 2-, 4-, 6-, and 8-car sets, based at Kyoto, Nara, and Aboshi depots.

=== Aboshi Depot ===
==== 8-car sets (A prefix) ====
Car No.	1	2	3	4	5	6	7	8
Designation	Tc	T'	M1	T'	M1	T	M'	Mc
Numbering	KuHa 221	SaHa 220	MoHa 220	SaHa 220	MoHa 220	SaHa 221	MoHa 221	KuMoHa 221

==== 6-car sets (B prefix) ====
Car No.	1	2	3	4	5	6
Designation	Tc	T'	M1	T	M'	Mc
Numbering	KuHa 221	SaHa 220	MoHa 220	SaHa 221	MoHa 221	KuMoHa 221

==== 4-car sets (C prefix) ====
Car No.	1	2	3	4
Designation	Tc	T	M'	Mc
Numbering	KuHa 221	SaHa 221	MoHa 221	KuMoHa 221

=== Nara Depot ===
==== 8-car sets (NB prefix) ====
Car No.	1	2	3	4	5	6	7	8
Designation	Tc	T'	M1	T'	M1	T	M'	Mc
Numbering	KuHa 221	SaHa 220	MoHa 220	SaHa 220	MoHa 220	SaHa 221	MoHa 221	KuMoHa 221

==== 6-car sets (NC prefix) ====
Car No.	1	2	3	4	5	6
Designation	Tc	T'	M1	T	M'	Mc
Numbering	KuHa 221	SaHa 220	MoHa 220	SaHa 221	MoHa 221	KuMoHa 221

==== 4-car sets (NA prefix) ====
Car No.	1	2	3	4
Designation	Tc	T	M'	Mc
Numbering	KuHa 221	SaHa 221	MoHa 221	KuMoHa 221
Designation	Tc'	M1	T	Mc1
Numbering	KuHa 220	MoHa 220	SaHa 220	KuMoHa 220

==== 2-car sets ====
Car No.	1	2
Designation	Tc'	Mc1
Numbering	KuHa 220	KuMoHa 220

=== Kyoto Depot ===
==== 4-car sets (K prefix) ====
Car No.	1	2	3	4
Designation	Tc	T	M'	Mc
Numbering	KuHa 221	SaHa 221	MoHa 221	KuMoHa 221

The KuMoHa 221 cars in some formations are equipped with a second de-icing pantograph.

== Interior ==
Seating is arranged as 2+2 abreast transverse flip-over seats.

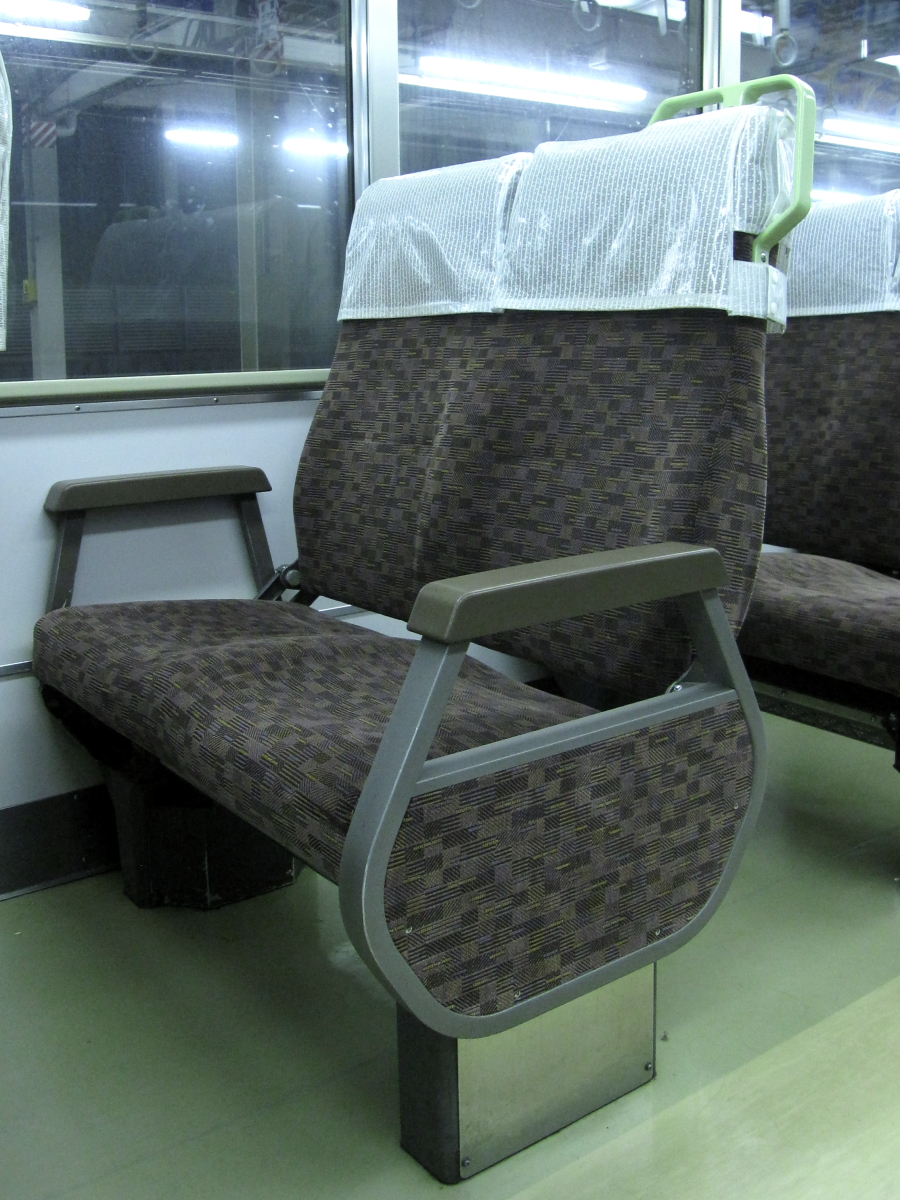
The seat in a 221 series train

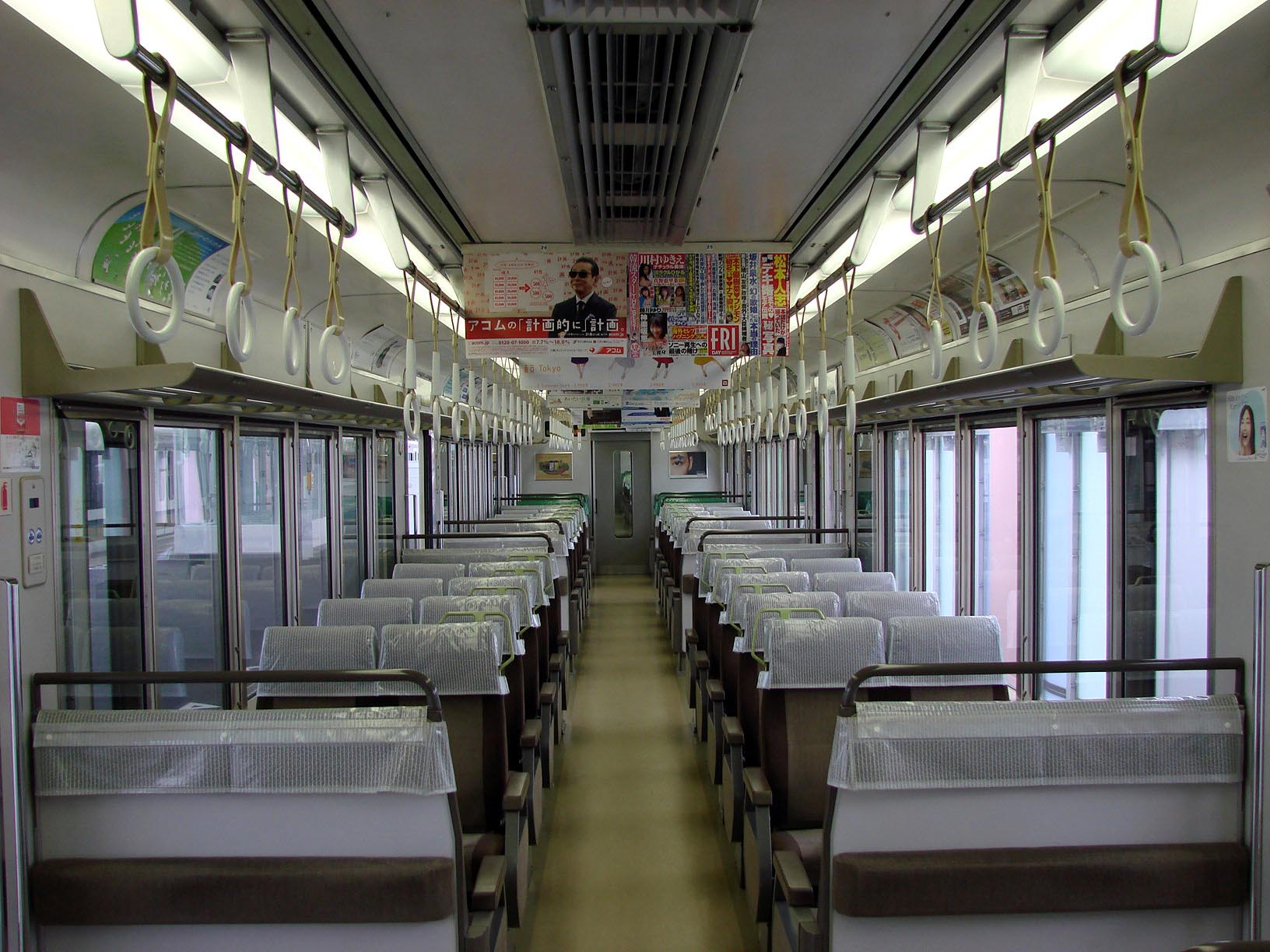
Original interior style in May 2009

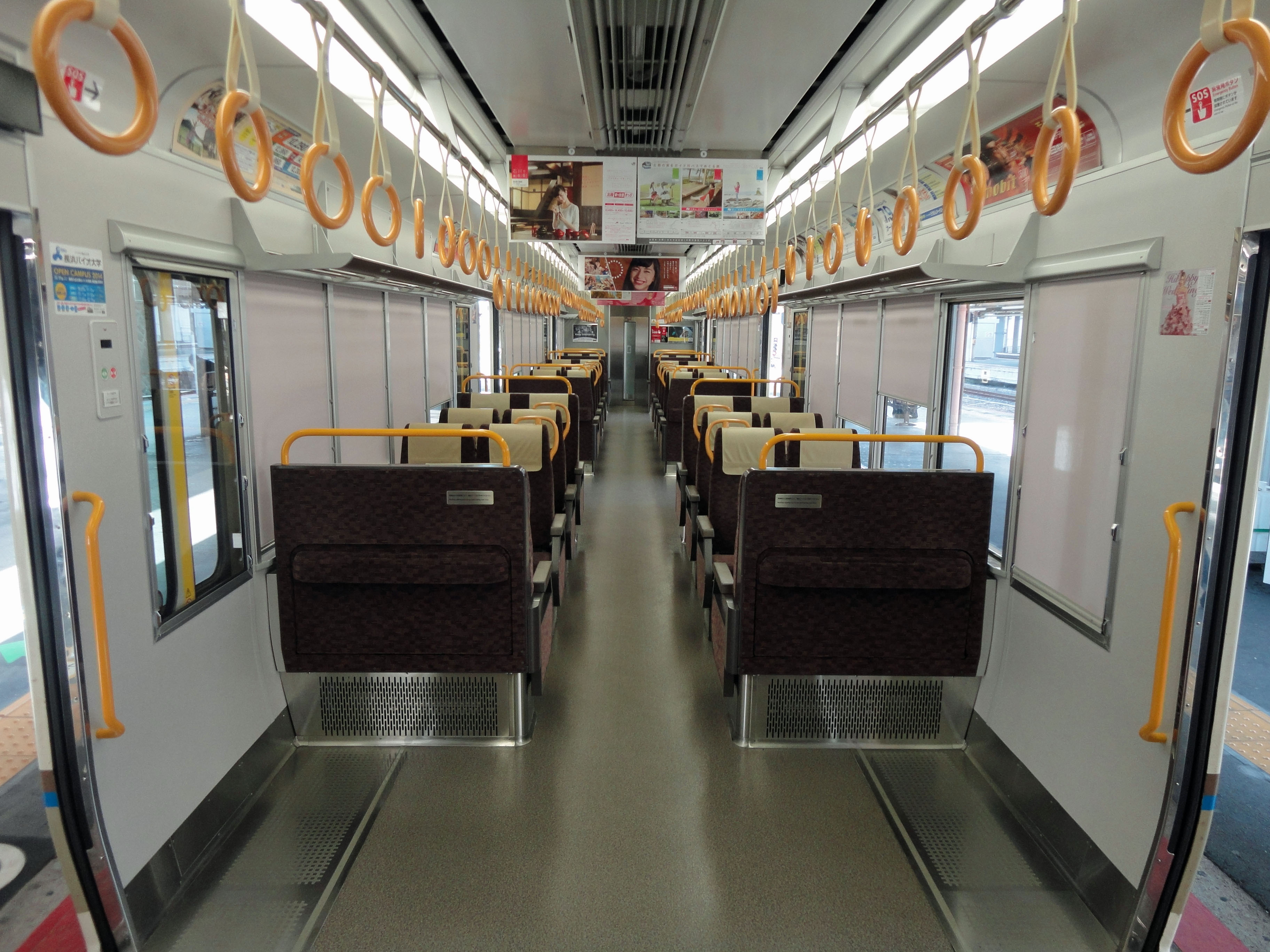
Interior of a refurbished train

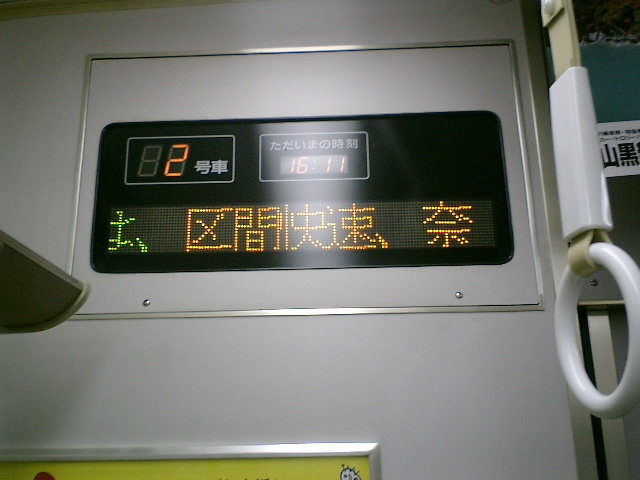
Original LED passenger information display in September 2005

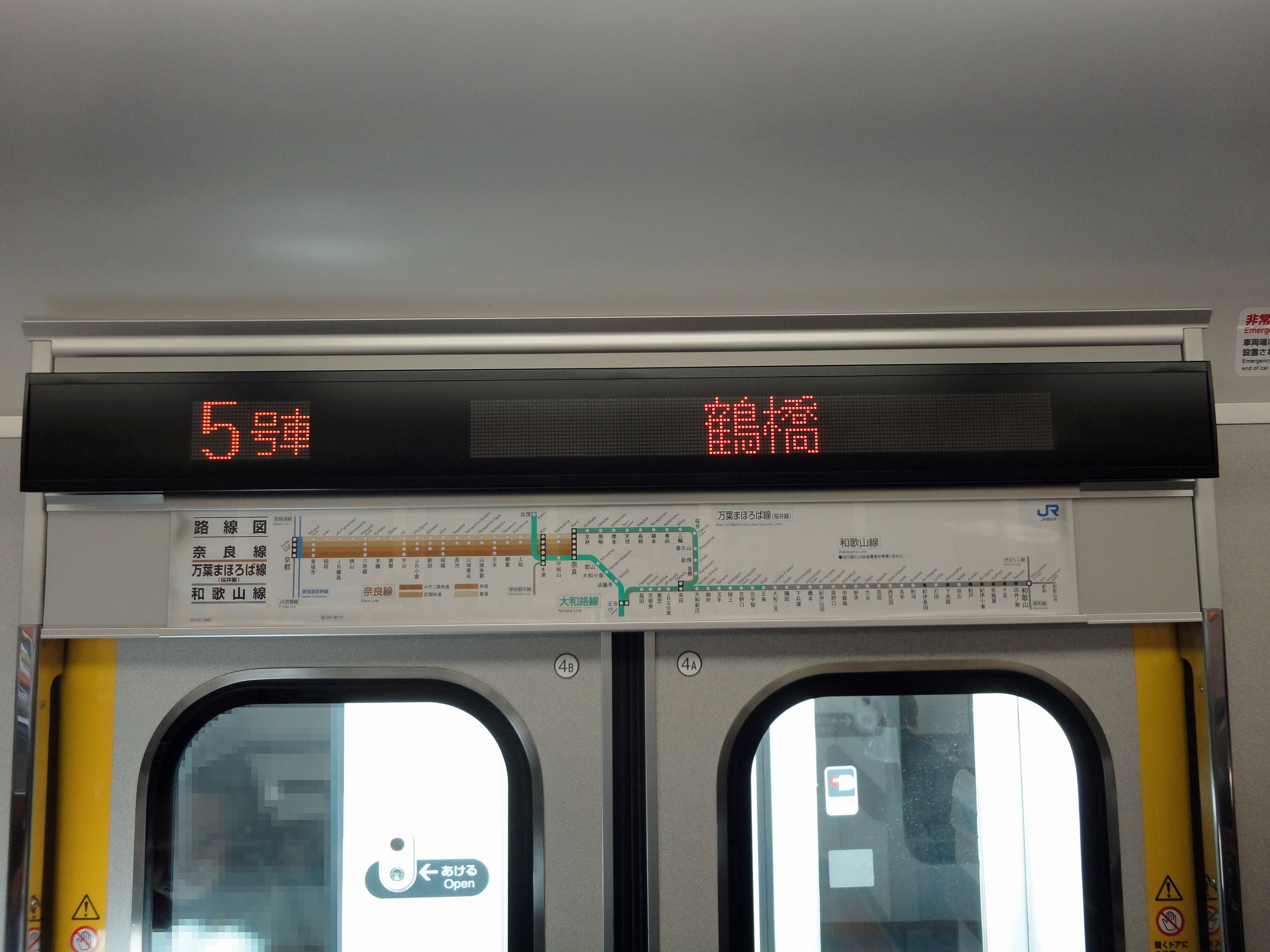
LED passenger information display of a refurbished train in October 2014

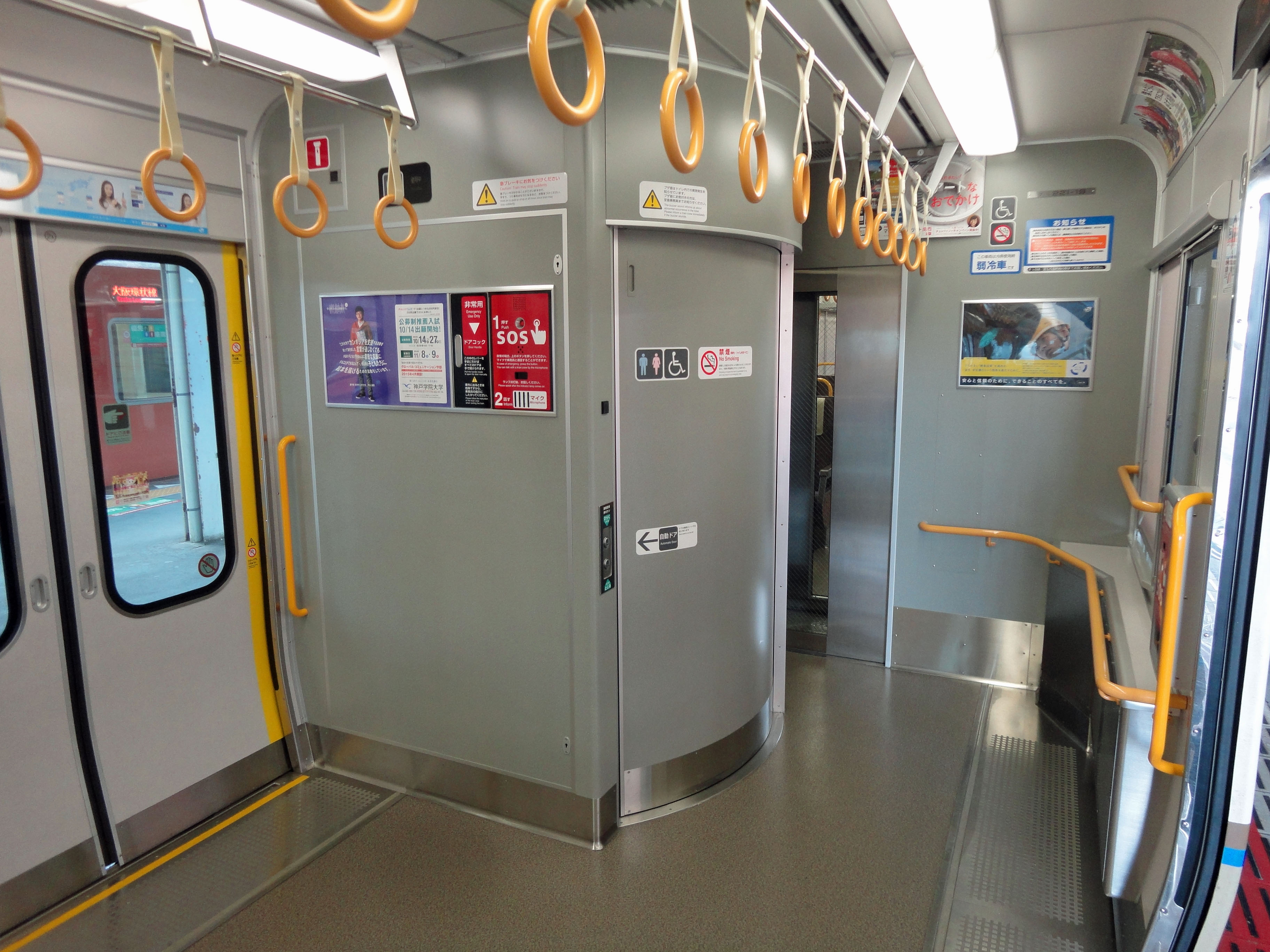
Wheelchair-accessible toilet of a refurbished train

== History ==
The first 221 series trains were introduced from the start of the revised timetable in March 1989.

The 221 series received the Laurel Prize in 1990.

=== Refurbishment ===
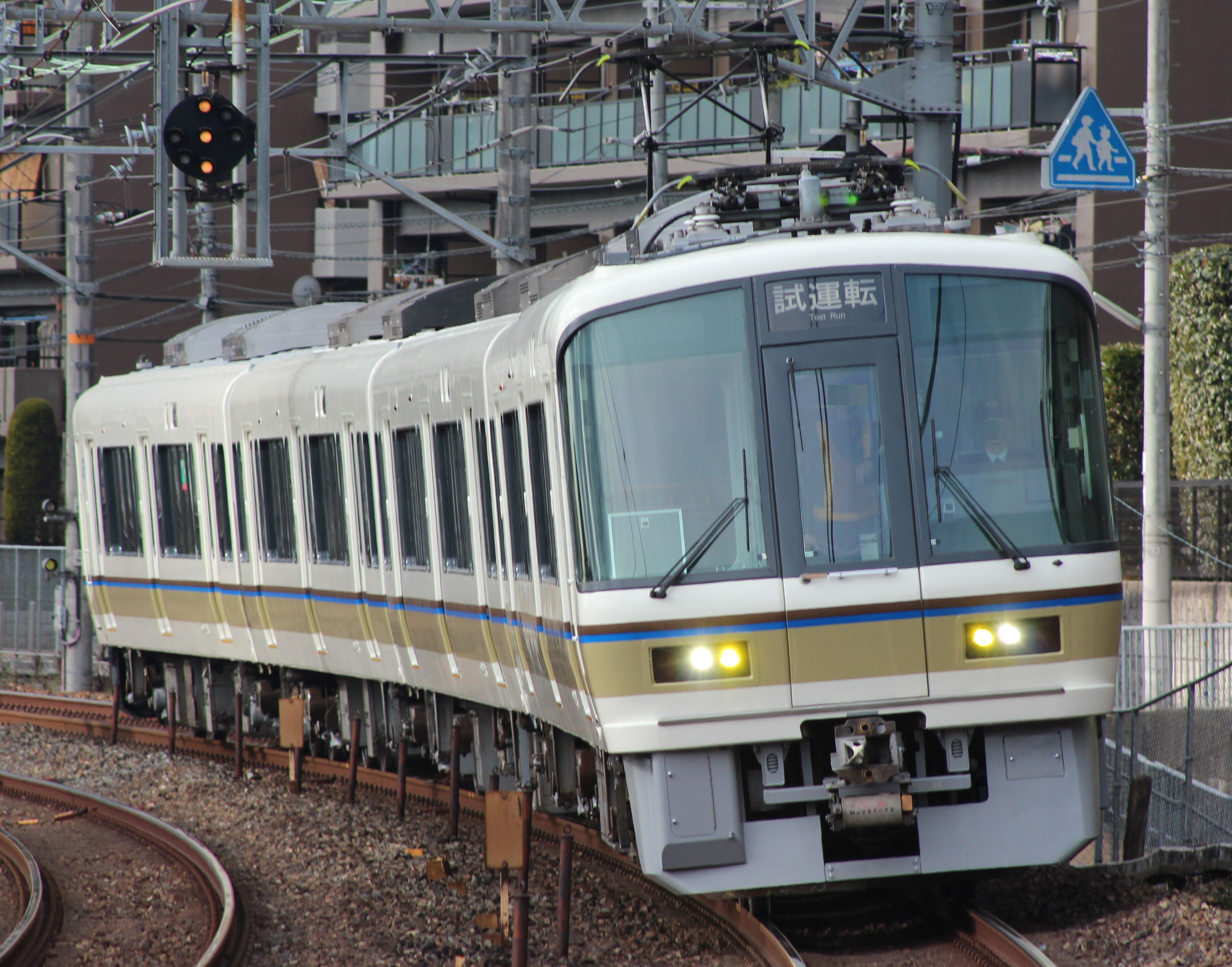
The first refurbished set, K12, on a test run in December 2012

From December 2012, a programme of refurbishment started, which will ultimately cover the entire fleet of 474 vehicles. Interior improvements include new universal access toilets, provision of wheelchair spaces, and flip-up seating next to the doorways. The first refurbished set, 4-car set K12, was returned to revenue service on 11 January 2013.
