= Suda Station =

Railway station in Hashimoto, Wakayama Prefecture, Japan

Suda Station 隅田駅
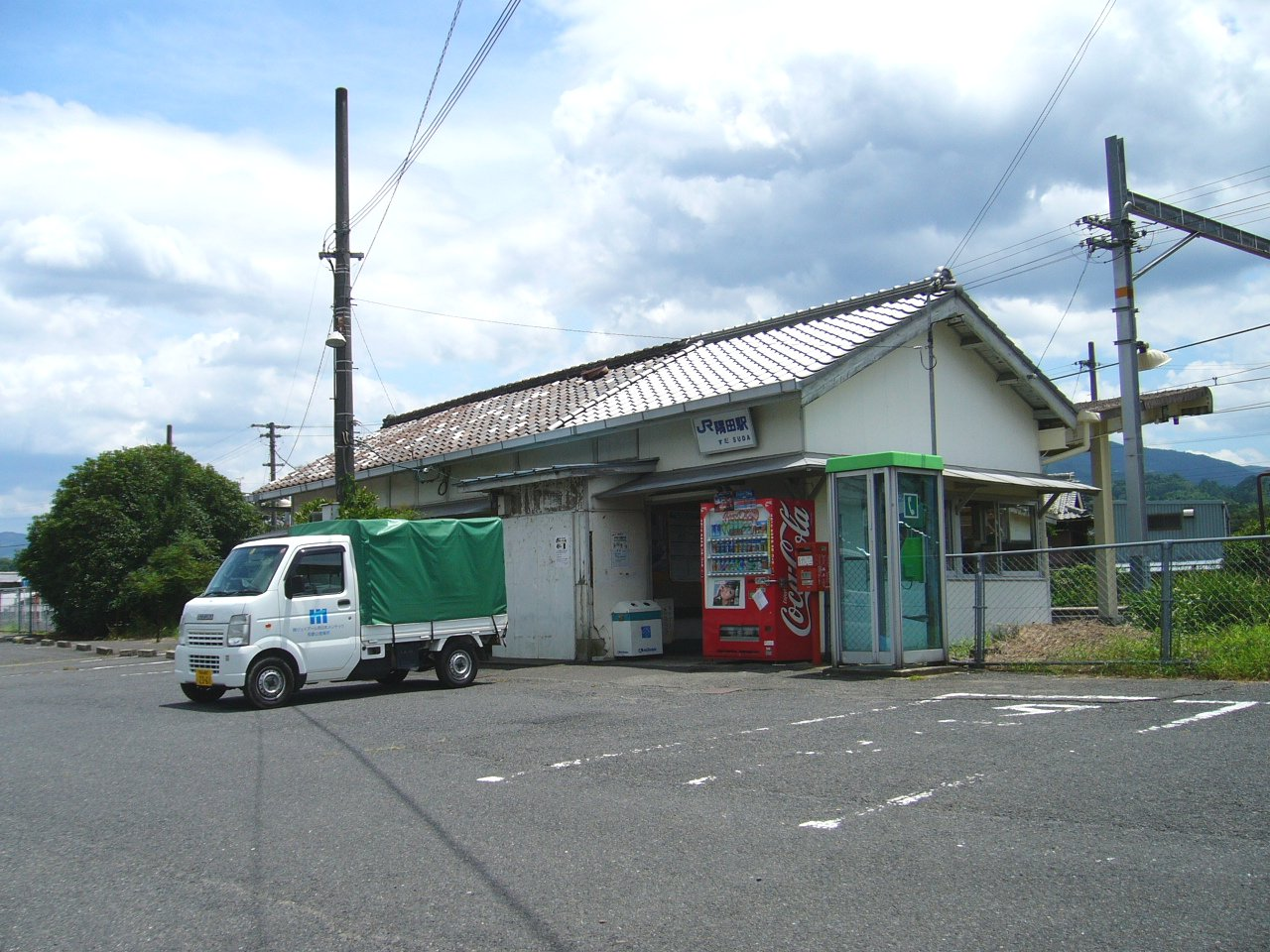
- Suda Station, July 2006

General information
- Location: 141, Suda-chō Imou, Hashimoto-shi, Wakayama-ken 648-0012; Japan
- Coordinates: 34°19′41″N 135°39′20″E
- System: JR-West commuter rail station
- Owner: West Japan Railway Company
- Operator: West Japan Railway Company
- Line: T Wakayama Line
- Distance: 41.1 km (25.5 miles) from Ōji
- Platforms: 2 side platforms
- Tracks: 2
- Train operators: West Japan Railway Company

Other information
- Status: Staffed
- Website: Official website

History
- Opened: 11 April 1898

Passengers
- FY2019: 214 daily
Services
Preceding station	JR-West	Following station
Wakayama Line
Yamato-Futami	Rapid Service	Shimohyōgo
Yamato-Futami	Local	Shimohyōgo
Location
- Location within Wakayama Prefecture Location within Japan

Suda Station (隅田駅, Suda-eki) is a passenger railway station in located in the city of Hashimoto, Wakayama Prefecture, Japan, operated by West Japan Railway Company (JR West).

== Lines ==
Suda Station is served by the Wakayama Line, and is located 41.1 kilometers from the terminus of the line at Ōji Station.

== Station layout ==
The station consists of two opposed side platforms connected by a footbridge. The station is unattended.

=== Platforms ===
1	■ T Wakayama Line	for Gojō and Ōji
2	■ T Wakayama Line	for Hashimoto and Wakayama

== Adjacent stations ==
«	Service	»
Wakayama Line
Yamato-Futami	Rapid Service	Shimohyōgo
Yamato-Futami	Local	Shimohyōgo

== History ==
Suda Station opened on April 11, 1898, on the Kiwa Railway. It was renamed to its present name on January 1, 1903. The line was sold to the Kansai Railway in 1904, which was subsequently nationalized in 1907. With the privatization of the Japan National Railways (JNR) on April 1, 1987, the station came under the aegis of the West Japan Railway Company.

== Passenger statistics ==
In fiscal 2019, the station was used by an average of 214 passengers daily (boarding passengers only).

== Surrounding Area ==
- Sumita Hachiman Shrine

== See also ==
- List of railway stations in Japan
