= Shimohyōgo Station (Wakayama) =

Railway station in Hashimoto, Wakayama Prefecture, Japan

Shimohyōgo Station 下兵庫駅
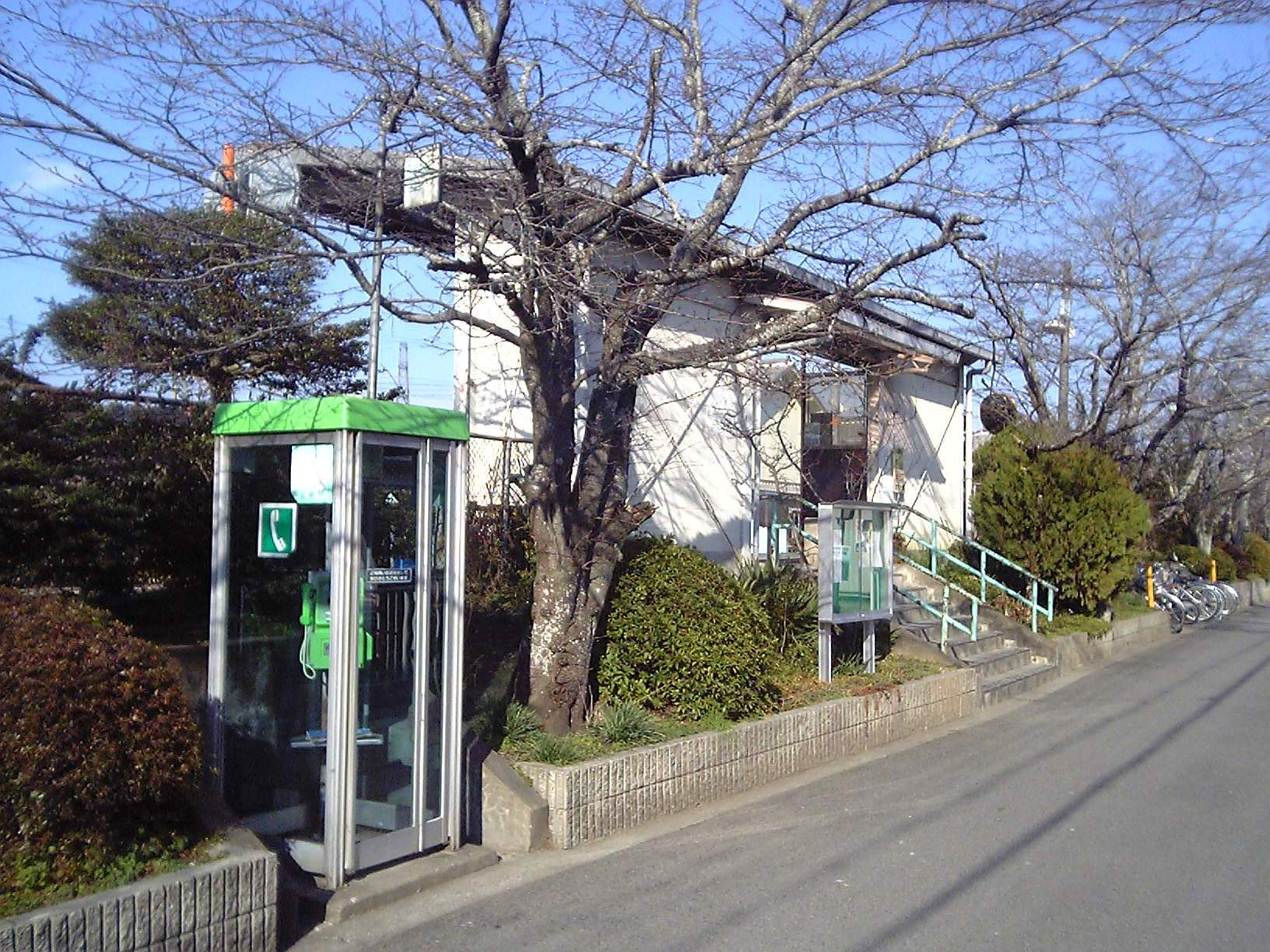
- Shimohyōgo Station, February 2010

General information
- Location: Suda-chō Shimohyōgo, Hashimoto-shi, Wakayama-ken 648-0016; Japan
- Coordinates: 34°19′22″N 135°38′05″E
- System: JR-West commuter rail station
- Owner: West Japan Railway Company
- Operator: West Japan Railway Company
- Line: T Wakayama Line
- Distance: 43.2 km (26.8 miles) from Ōji
- Platforms: 1 side platform
- Tracks: 1
- Train operators: West Japan Railway Company

Other information
- Status: Staffed
- Website: Official website

History
- Opened: 1 October 1968

Passengers
- FY2019: 126 daily
Services
Preceding station	JR-West	Following station
Wakayama Line
Suda	Rapid Service	Hashimoto
Suda	Local	Hashimoto
Location
- Location within Wakayama Prefecture Location within Japan

Shimohyōgo Station (下兵庫駅, Shimohyōgo-eki) is a passenger railway station in located in the city of Hashimoto, Wakayama Prefecture, Japan, operated by West Japan Railway Company (JR West).

== Lines ==
Shimohyōgo Station is served by the Wakayama Line, and is located 43.2 kilometers from the terminus of the line at Ōji Station.

== Station layout ==
The station consists of one side platform serving a single bidirectional track. There is no station building, but only a small weather shelter. The station is unattended.

== Adjacent stations ==
«	Service	»
West Japan Railway Company
Wakayama Line
Suda	Rapid Service	Hashimoto
Suda	Local	Hashimoto

== History ==
Shimohyōgo Station opened on October 1, 1968. With the privatization of the Japan National Railways (JNR) on April 1, 1987, the station came under the aegis of the West Japan Railway Company.

== Passenger statistics ==
In fiscal 2019, the station was used by an average of 126 passengers daily (boarding passengers only).

== Surrounding Area ==
- Koyaguchi Park
- Wakayama Prefectural Ito Chuo High School

== See also ==
- List of railway stations in Japan
