= Yamato-Futami Station =

Railway station in Gojō, Nara Prefecture, Japan

Yamato-Futami Station 大和二見駅
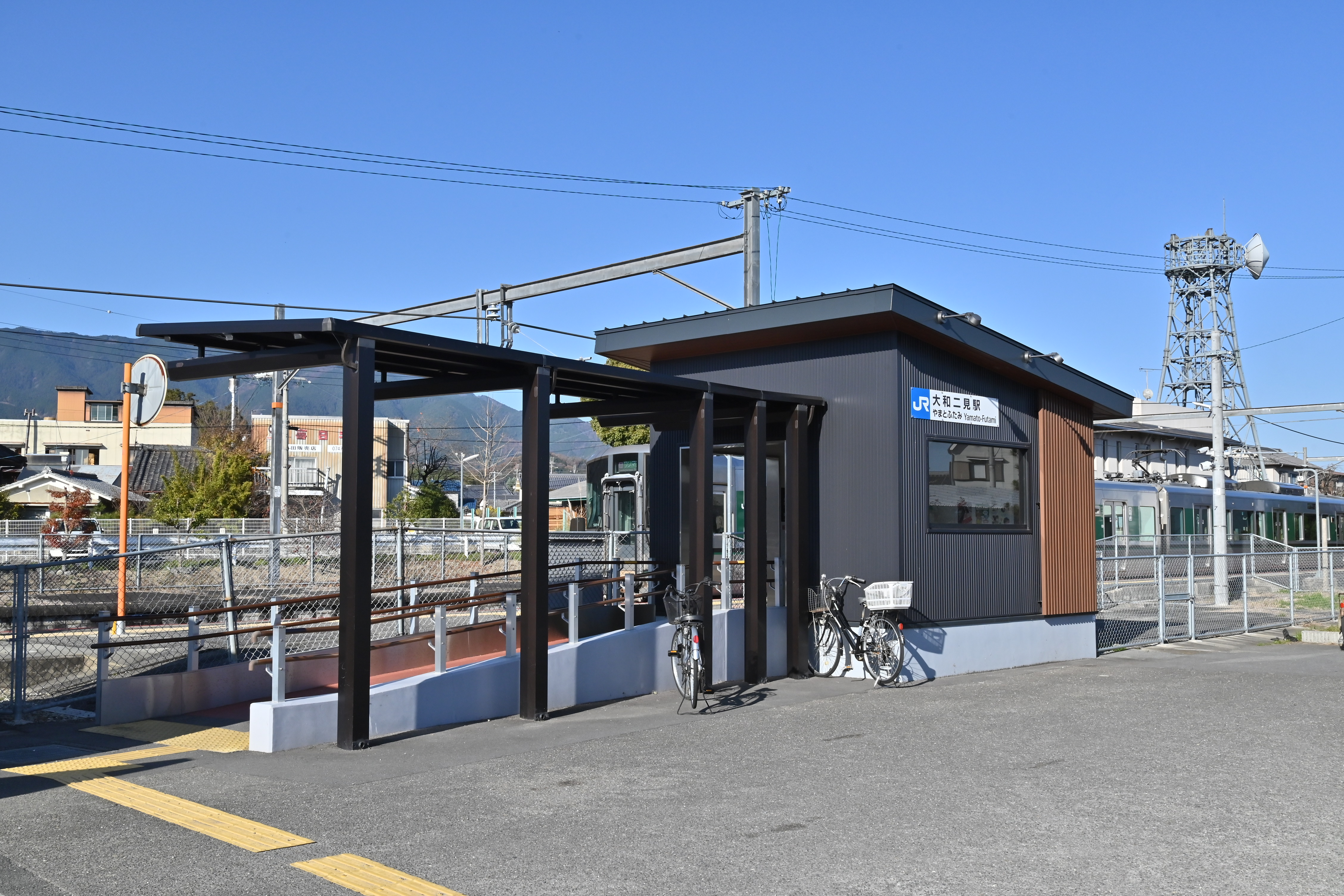
- Yamato-Futami Station - December 2022

General information
- Location: 1-1, Futami 3-chōme, Gojō-shi, Nara-ken 637-0071; Japan
- Coordinates: 34°20′45″N 135°41′05″E
- System: JR-West commuter rail station
- Owner: West Japan Railway Company
- Operator: West Japan Railway Company
- Line: T Wakayama Line
- Distance: 37.1 km (23.1 miles) from Ōji
- Platforms: 1 side platform
- Tracks: 1
- Train operators: West Japan Railway Company
- Bus stands: 1
- Connections: Gojo City Community Bus C (Hatakeda—Gojo Bus Center)

Construction
- Structure type: At grade
- Parking: None
- Cycle facilities: Available
- Accessible: None

Other information
- Website: http://www.jr-odekake.net/eki/top.php?id=0621812

History
- Opened: 3 June 1902
- Electrified: 1984
- Former names: Futami (to 1919)

Passengers
- 2019: 205 daily
Services
Preceding station	JR-West	Following station
T Wakayama Line
Suda toward Wakayama and Kokawa	Local	Gojō toward Nara, Ōji, and Takada
Suda toward Wakayama and Kokawa	Local	Terminus
Suda toward Wakayama	Rapid Service; Local from Gojō	Gojō toward Nara and Takada
Location

Yamato-Futami Station (大和二見駅, Yamato-Futami-eki) is a passenger railway station in located in the city of Gojō, Nara Prefecture, Japan, operated by West Japan Railway Company (JR West).

== Lines ==
Yamato-Futami Station is served by the Wakayama Line, and is located 37.1 kilometers from the terminus of the line at Ōji.

== Station layout ==
The station is an above-ground station with one side platform on the left side of the station when facing towards Hashimoto, and the platform is slightly curved. As originally built, the station had two platforms and three tracks, with an island platform opposite the side platform, and a siding. Currently, the track on the island platform side has been removed. The platform still remains, but is blocked off with wire mesh, making it impossible to enter. It is an unstaffed station.

== History ==
Yamato-Futami Station opened as Futami Station (二見駅, Futami-eki) on 3 June 1902 on the Kiwa Railway. The Kiwa Railway was absorbed by the Kansai Railway in 1904 and was nationalized in 1907. The station was renamed to its present name on 15 April 1919. With the privatization of the Japan National Railways (JNR) on April 1, 1987, the station came under the aegis of the West Japan Railway Company.

== Passenger statistics ==
In fiscal 2019, the station was used by an average of 205 passengers daily (boarding passengers only).

== Surrounding Area ==
- Kinki Regional Development Bureau, Ministry of Land, Infrastructure, Transport and Tourism, Wakayama Office of River and National High Way, Gojō Branch office (近畿地方整備局和歌山河川国道事務所五條出張所)
- Japan National Route 24
- City of Gojō Kōzuke Sports Park

== See also ==
- List of railway stations in Japan
