= 117 series =

Japanese suburban electric multiple unit train type

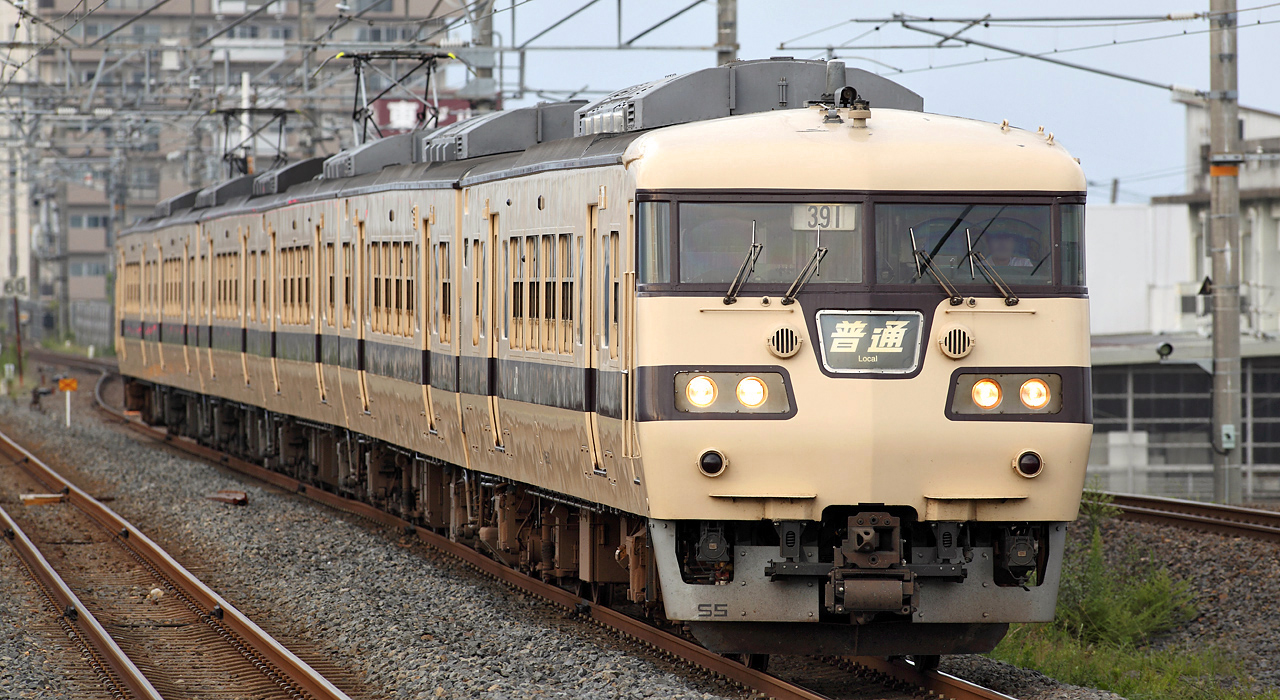
- JR-West 117 series in original livery in August 2009
- Manufacturers: Kawasaki Heavy Industries, Kinki Sharyo, Nippon Sharyo, Tokyu Car Corporation
- Replaced: 113 series, 153 series
- Constructed: 1979–1986
- Entered service: 1979
- Retired: 2023
- Scrapped: 2013 (JR Central sets)
- Number built: 216 vehicles
- Number in service: 96 vehicles (as of 1 April 2017)
- Number preserved: 2 vehicles
- Successor: 221 series, 223 series, 225 series, 227 series, 313 series
- Formation: 4/6/8 cars per trainset
- Operators: JNR (1979–1987); JR-West (1987–present); JR Central (1987–July 2013)
- Depots: Hineno, Kyoto, Miyahara, Ōgaki, Okayama, Yamaguchi
- Line served: Kosei Line Kusatsu Line Sanyo Main Line Akō Line

Specifications
- Car body construction: Steel
- Car length: 20,000 mm (65 ft 7 in)
- Width: 2,905 mm (9 ft 6.4 in)
- Height: 4,066 mm (13 ft 4.1 in)
- Doors: 2 pairs per side 1 per side (117-7000 series)
- Maximum speed: JR West:115 km/h (71 mph); Other:110 km/h (68 mph)
- Weight: Minimum: 31.3 t (30.8 long tons; 34.5 short tons), end car without lavatory Maximum: 43.7 t (43.0 long tons; 48.2 short tons), powered car
- Traction system: Resistor control
- Power output: 120 kW per motor (MT54D DC motors)
- Deceleration: 3.5 km/(h⋅s) (2.2 mph/s)(service); 5.0 km/(h⋅s) (3.1 mph/s) (emergency)
- Electric system: 1,500 V DC overhead line
- Current collection: PS16J diamond shaped pantograph
- Bogies: DT32E (powered cars); TR69H (trailers)
- Safety systems: ATS-SW, ATS-ST
- Coupling system: Shibata-type
- Track gauge: 1,067 mm (3 ft 6 in)

The 117 series (117系, 117-kei) is a Japanese suburban electric multiple unit (EMU) train type introduced in 1979 by Japanese National Railways (JNR), and currently operated by West Japan Railway Company (JR-West). The train type was operated by Central Japan Railway Company (JR Central) from 1987 until 2013. A total of 216 cars were manufactured. When JNR was privatized and divided into the individual JR Group companies, JR Central received 72 cars, while JR-West took possession of 144.

== Background ==
=== Features ===
The 117 series was first introduced to replace the 113 series trains that had been providing special rapid service in the Keihanshin region on the Tōkaidō Main Line and Sanyō Main Line. 113 series cars were used in this role from 1972 along with 153 series express cars that had become surplus as a result of the opening of the Sanyō Shinkansen to Okayama. Although 113 series cars were run in place of 153 series cars, the two were not entirely the same; the 153s had been retrofitted with air conditioning, but their traction motors (MT46 type, producing 100 kW (134 hp) @ 375 V), first built in 1958, were underpowered. Also, as they were designed for express service, they had entryways which required passengers to step up onto the main floor—unsuitable during peak commuter times.

The 117 series addressed these issues, matched the passenger accommodation offered by competing services and provided JNR with a train designed for the transit conditions in the Keihanshin region. The interior was based on the KiHa 66/67 series DMUs being operated in the Kitakyushu region. This also marked the beginning of JNR's effort to standardize their rolling stock.

In 1982, 153 series trains providing the rapid service in the Nagoya area were replaced with 117 series trains which began duty on the Tokai Liner service.

=== Configurations ===
The 117 series was designed to be operated in 6-car configurations, with a 2:1 ratio of powered cars to trailer cars. At the time the 117 series were being introduced, this was JNR's standard configuration. In later years, 4-car configurations with a powered car to trailer car ratio of 1:1 and 8-car configurations with a ratio of 3:1 were being used. The 117 series has no intermediate trailer cars.

6-car original configuration
KuHa117	MoHa117	MoHa116	MoHa117	MoHa116	KuHa116
Tc	M	M'	M	M'	Tc'

4-car configuration
KuHa117	MoHa117	MoHa116	KuHa116
Tc	M	M'	Tc'

8-car configuration
KuHa117	MoHa117	MoHa116	MoHa117	MoHa116	MoHa117	MoHa116	KuHa116
Tc	M	M'	M	M'	M	M'	Tc'

- KuHa117 – Trailer car with driving cab, west end.
- MoHa117 – Powered car with pantograph and electrical apparatus to be used as a set with a MoHa116 car.
- MoHa116 – Powered car with motor-generator and compressor to be used as a set with a MoHa117 car.
- KuHa116 – Trailer car with driving cab, east end.

== Construction ==
This information relates to the 0 sub-series.

On September 12, 1979, the first six-car set emerged from Kawasaki Heavy Industries' Hyogo Works. The sets' completion dates and manufacturers are as follows:

Set	Completion date	Manufacturer
1	September 12, 1979	Kawasaki Heavy Industries
2	January 29, 1980	Kawasaki Heavy Industries
3	January 29, 1980	Kawasaki Heavy Industries
4	January 12, 1980	Kinki Sharyo
5	February 5, 1980	Kinki Sharyo
6	February 5, 1980	Kinki Sharyo
7	February 26, 1980	Kawasaki Heavy Industries
8	March 13, 1980	Kinki Sharyo
9	April 22, 1980	Nippon Sharyo
10	April 22, 1980	Nippon Sharyo
11	July 8, 1980	Nippon Sharyo
12	July 8, 1980	Nippon Sharyo
13	April 8, 1980	Kawasaki Heavy Industries
14	April 8, 1980	Kawasaki Heavy Industries
15	June 3, 1980	Kawasaki Heavy Industries
16	June 3, 1980	Kawasaki Heavy Industries
17	June 17, 1980	Kawasaki Heavy Industries
18	June 17, 1980	Kawasaki Heavy Industries
19	May 14, 1980	Kinki Sharyo
20	May 14, 1980	Kinki Sharyo
21	July 15, 1980	Kinki Sharyo

=== Car body ===
The 117 series trains have 20 meters (65 ft 7 in) long corrosion-resistant steel bodies with two sets of semi-automatic sliding double doors per side (Nagoya-area cars have fully automatic doors). The 117 features a built-in classification headboard directly below the windshield's center post.

The 117's original livery was cream with a thin, horizontal maroon band below the windows.

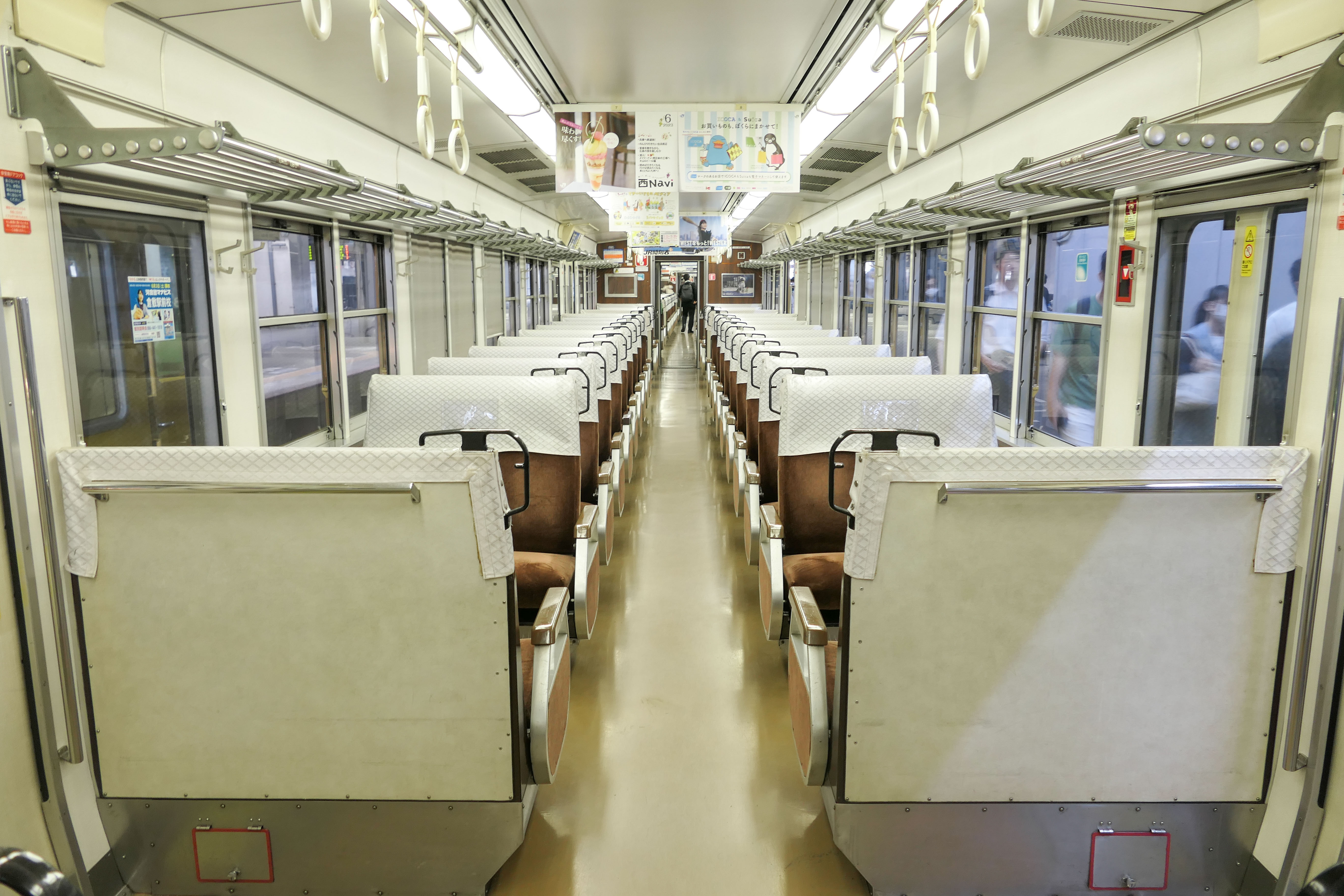
Interior of a JR West 117

All 117 series cars were originally equipped with reversible transverse seats, but lacked strap hangers. The interior had wood trim intended to set the 117 apart from other suburban trains. The cars feature flat ceilings joined to the walls and an angled panel above the luggage rack.

Air conditioning was via JNR's standard AU75B and AU75C units situated in the center of the roof (42,000 kcal/h. B is used on trailer cars with driver's station, C on powered cars. 100 sub-series cars were upgraded to AU75E).

=== Major components ===
==== Traction motors ====
The 117 series uses type MT54D traction motors (rated at 120 kW (161 hp) @ 375 V). It was also used in 113 series trains. The 117 also had JNR's standard final drive ratio, 4.82:1. Having the same acceleration rate as the 113 series and 115 series, 6-car sets with four powered and two trailer cars were not quite as powerful as those in use in comparable services by competing private railways. The difference in 4-car sets with only two powered cars was even more pronounced.

==== Train control ====
Equipped with the CS43A control gear also in use on the 381 series and 417 series, the 117 series included a retarder to maintain speed on an incline. While the CS12 control gear in the 113 series and 153 series and the CS15 control gear in the 115 series and 165 series had been improved to provide smoother acceleration, the CS43A, which was brand new at the time, was chosen.

==== Bogies ====
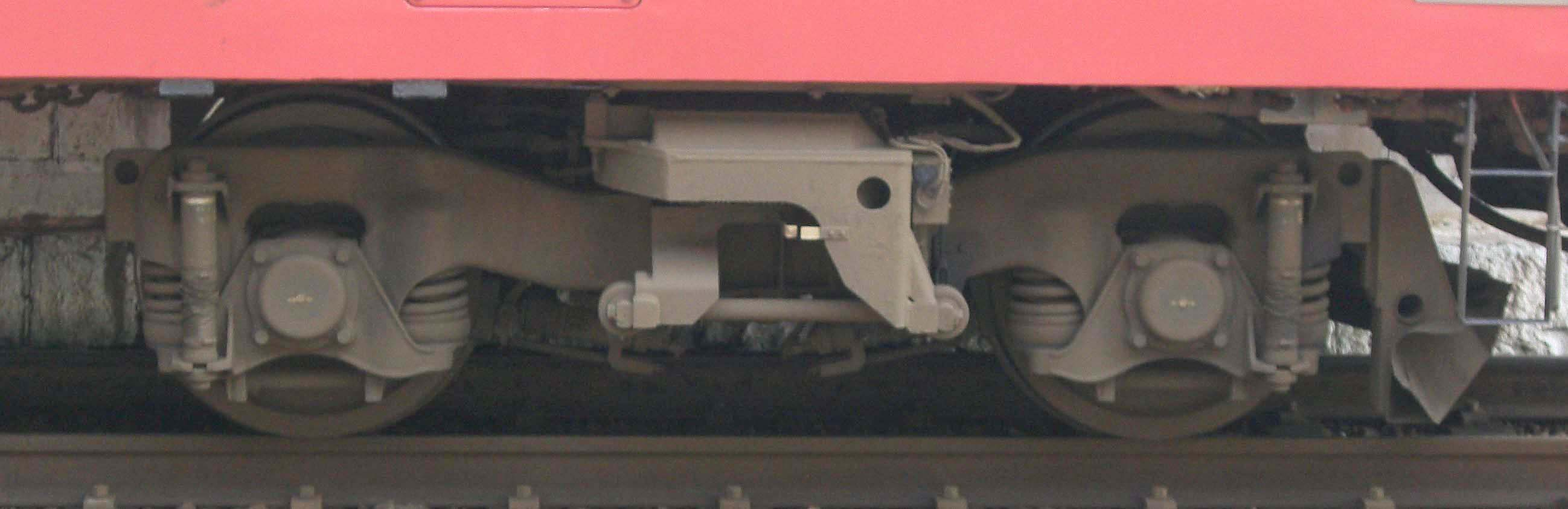
Type TR69H bogie on a JR-West 117 series (Sunliner rapid) January 2007

Two types of bogies were considered for the 117 series before a third was chosen. The high-speed DT24 air spring bogies from the 153 series were considered but passed over, as were the DT21 coil spring trucks, standard at the time. Ultimately, the 117 series was equipped with DT32E bogies on the powered cars and TR69H bogies on the trailers.

==== Pantograph ====
The 117 series uses the standard PS16 pantograph, however for resistance to the effects of cold weather conditions and snow encountered when running on the Kosei Line, the PS16J variant is used.

==== Couplers ====
Standard JNR Shibata-type couplers are used on the 117 series, but like on the 153 series, automatic electrical couplers were added to ease lash-up operations when creating 12-car sets for rush hour. Based on the success of this equipment, 221 series and 223 series were similarly equipped.

== Variants ==
=== 0 subseries ===
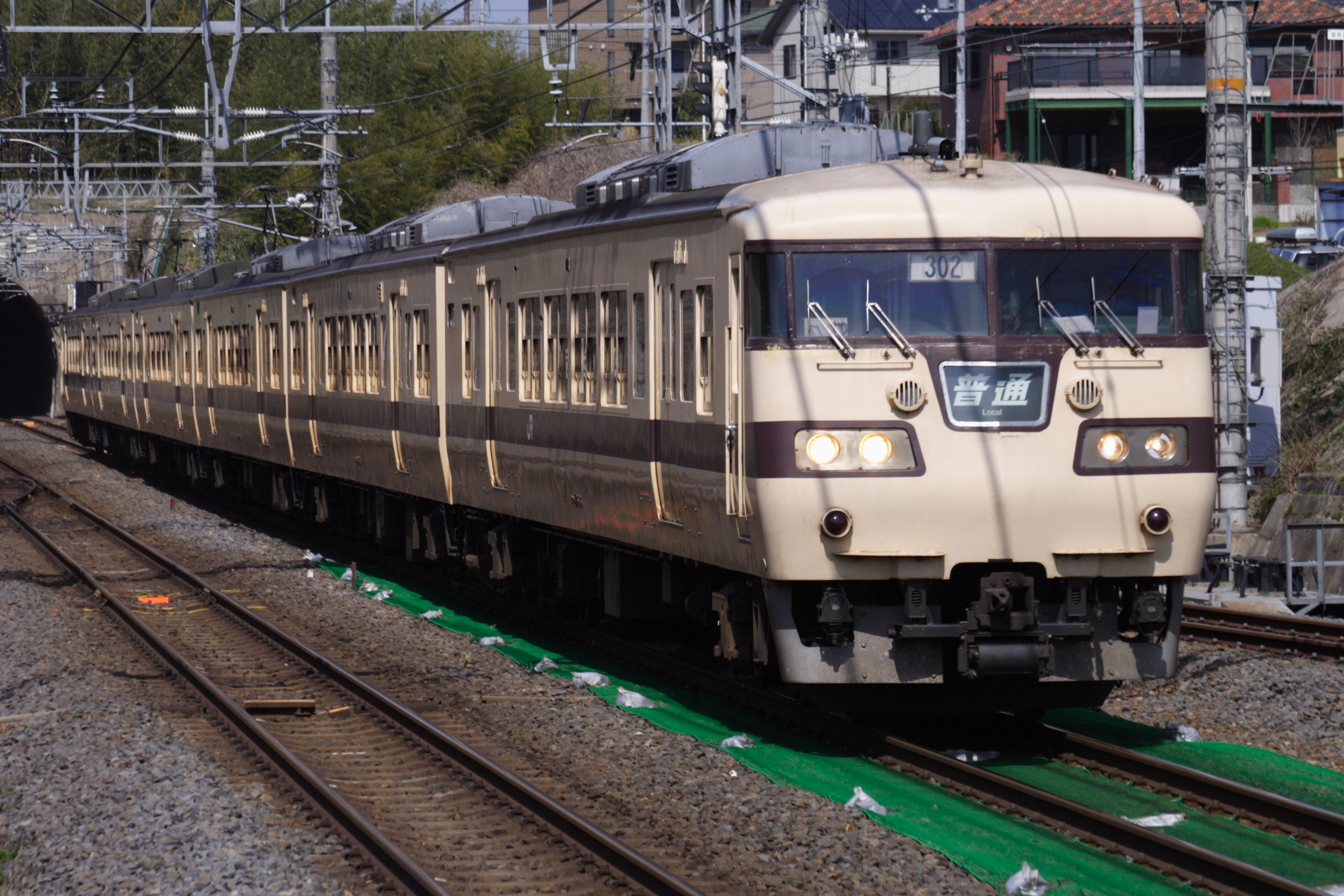
JR-West Keihanshin Region 117–0 series

From 1979 until 1980, 21 6-car sets were produced for a total of 126 individual cars. Dispatched from Miyahara Depot and assigned to rapid and special rapid service, these were used to replace 153 series and 165 series trains.

In 1982, nine 6-car sets entered service in the Nagoya area. These were assigned to Ōgaki Depot.

=== 100 and 200 subseries ===
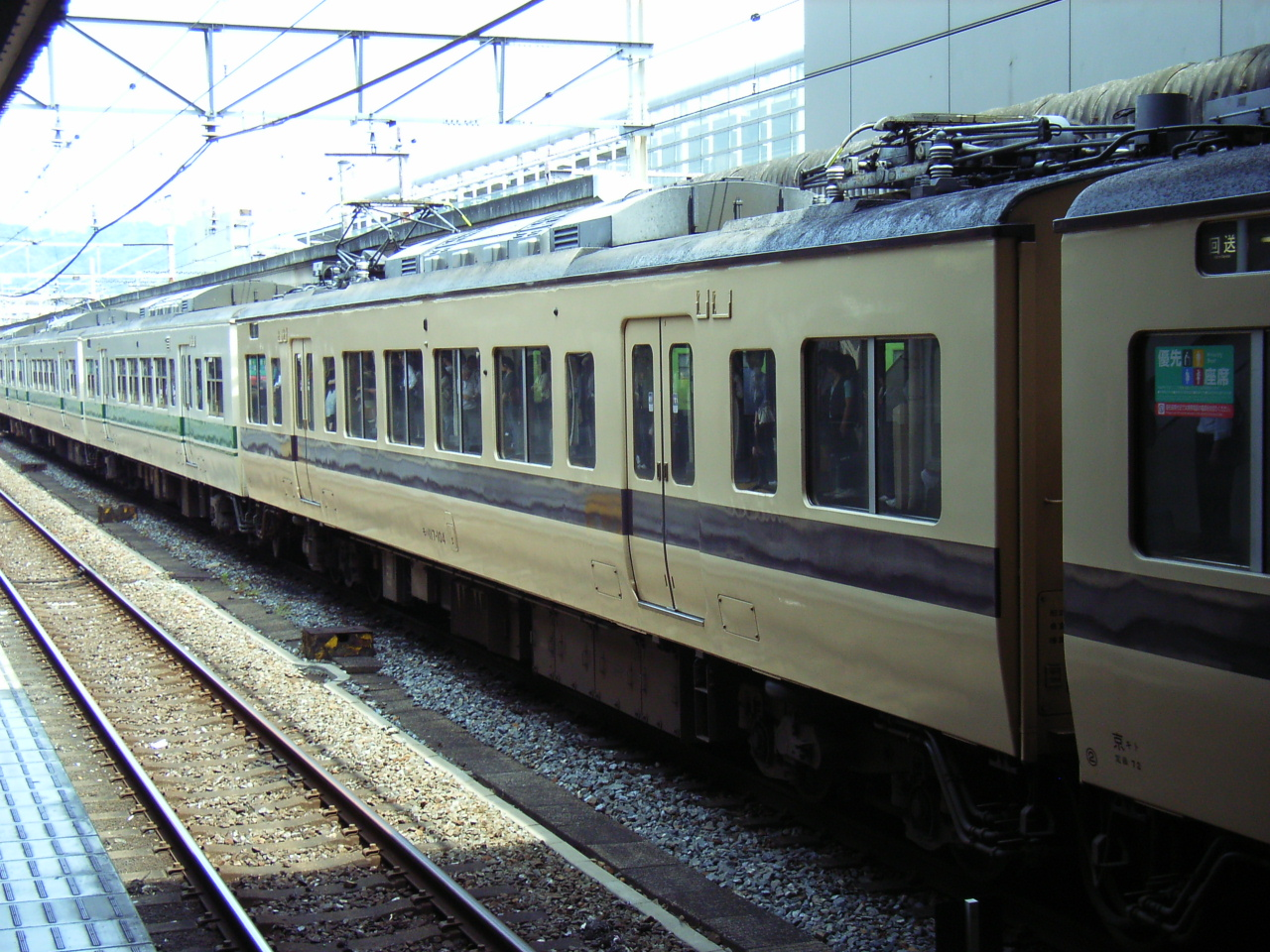
MoHa117 100 sub-series with anti-frost pantograph

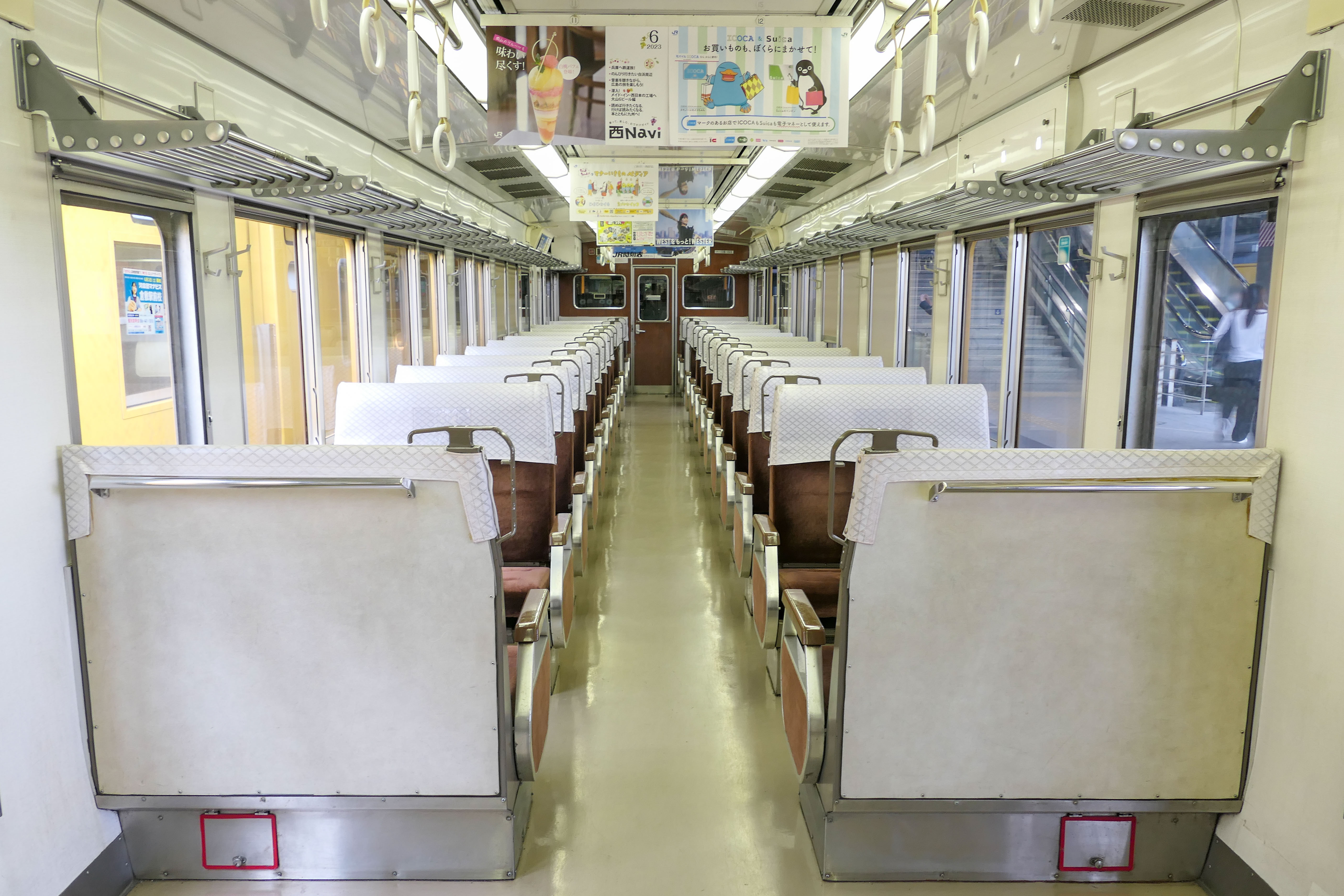
100 sub-series interior

In the timetable effective November 1, 1986, just before the April 1987 privatization of JNR, the frequency of special rapid services in the Keihanshin region increased, and 6-car sets in the Nagoya area were shortened to four cars. It had been four years since any modifications were made, and around this time improvements were made to all aspects of the trains. The most significant changes were:

- Seats were added in the unused space at the ends of the saloons.
- The original side windows were replaced with units that have a single pane which closes vertically.
- Bogies were replaced with DT50C types on powered cars and TR235B types (both developed for the 205 series) on the trailer cars. As a result of this, the interior floor was lowered 45 mm.
- Installation of contoured bench seats.

== Operations ==
From the time of their construction until the privatization of JNR, the 117 series were the workhorses of the Keihanshin and Nagoya regions' rapid and special rapid services.

Following privatization, JR-West kept the cars used in the Keihanshin region while JR Central kept those used in Nagoya. Each railway's use of their 117 series trains is explained below.

=== JR-West ===
==== From special rapid service to withdrawal and reassignment ====
After the arrival of the 221 series in the Keihanshin region, the maximum speed of special rapid trains was increased to 115 km/h (71 mph) as of the March 10, 1990, timetable. That year, all 117 series cars underwent improvement to their brakes to accommodate this new operating speed. As new 221 series cars entered service, there was an excess of 117 cars, and as the speed of most special rapid services was further increased to 120 km/h (75 mph), 117s were reassigned to other lines. The 300 subseries entered service on the Fukuchiyama Line, while shortened consists began running on the Nara Line, Kosei Line, Kusatsu Line, and on the Sanyō Main Line in the Okayama area on the Sunliner service. Cars which became surplus due to the use of shorter configurations were converted into the 115 series 3500 subseries. This was the first reduction in the number of 117 series cars.

117 series cars retained in special rapid service were used only in early morning and late night runs because of their 115 km/h (71 mph) limit and door configuration. With the appearance of the 223 series in the May 11, 1999, timetable, capable of operating at 130 km/h (81 mph) between Nishi-Akashi and Kusatsu, 117 series trains were withdrawn from special rapid service. A year later, 221 series cars were also removed from this service.

In 2000, due to use of the newer 221 series, some 117 series trains were withdrawn from Tambaji rapid service on the Fukuchiyama Line and reassigned to Hineno Depot for operation on the Wakayama Line. Again in 2001, 117 series cars were replaced by 221 series units on Miyako rapid service yon the Nara Line. In 2005, 100 subseries intermediate cars were reassigned to the Shimonoseki Administrative Office, and later two sets of 300 subseries trains were also sent there to operate in the region on the Sanyō Main Line.

==== Upgrade to 300 sub-series ====
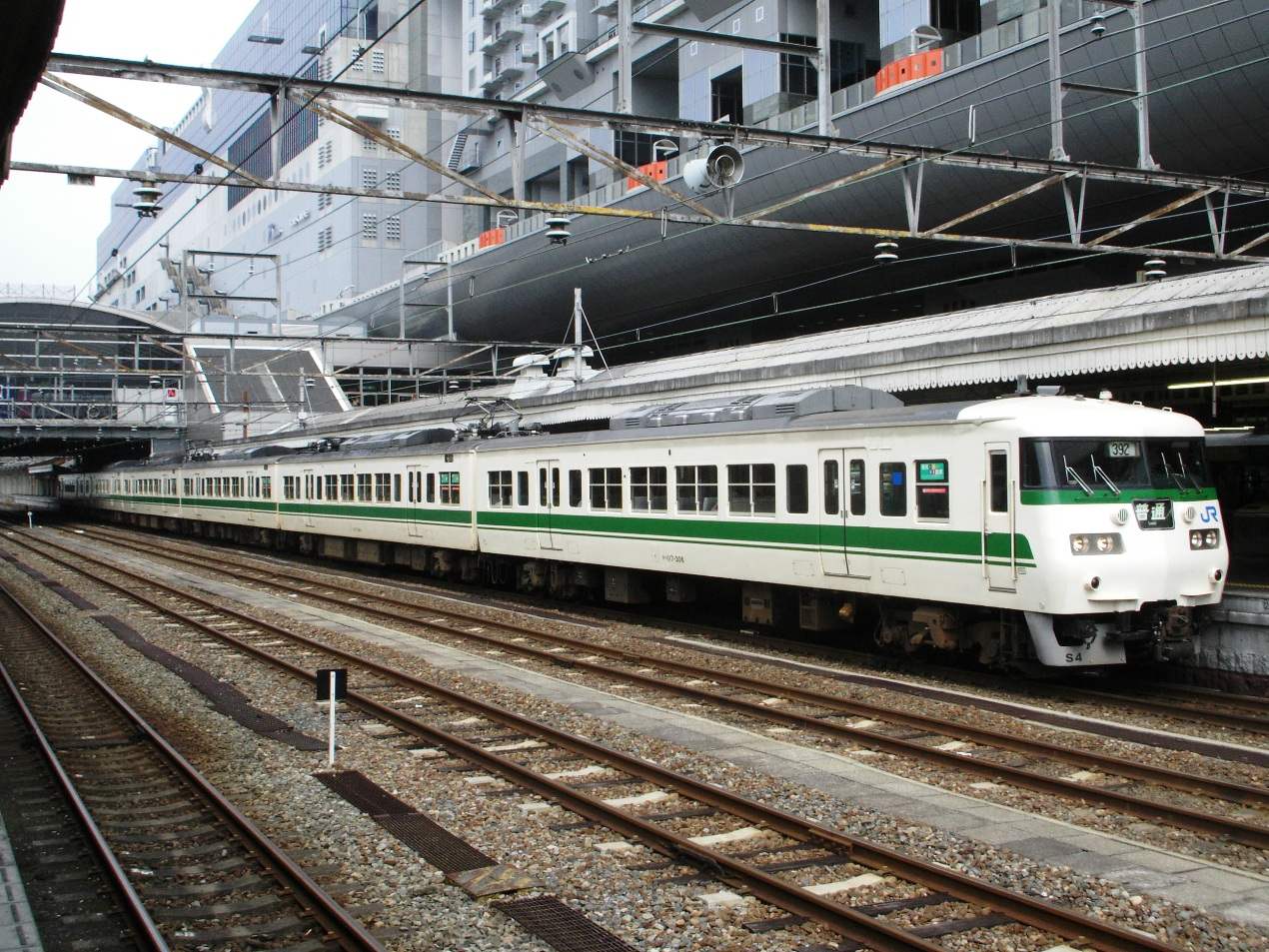
300 subseries in Fukuchiyama livery

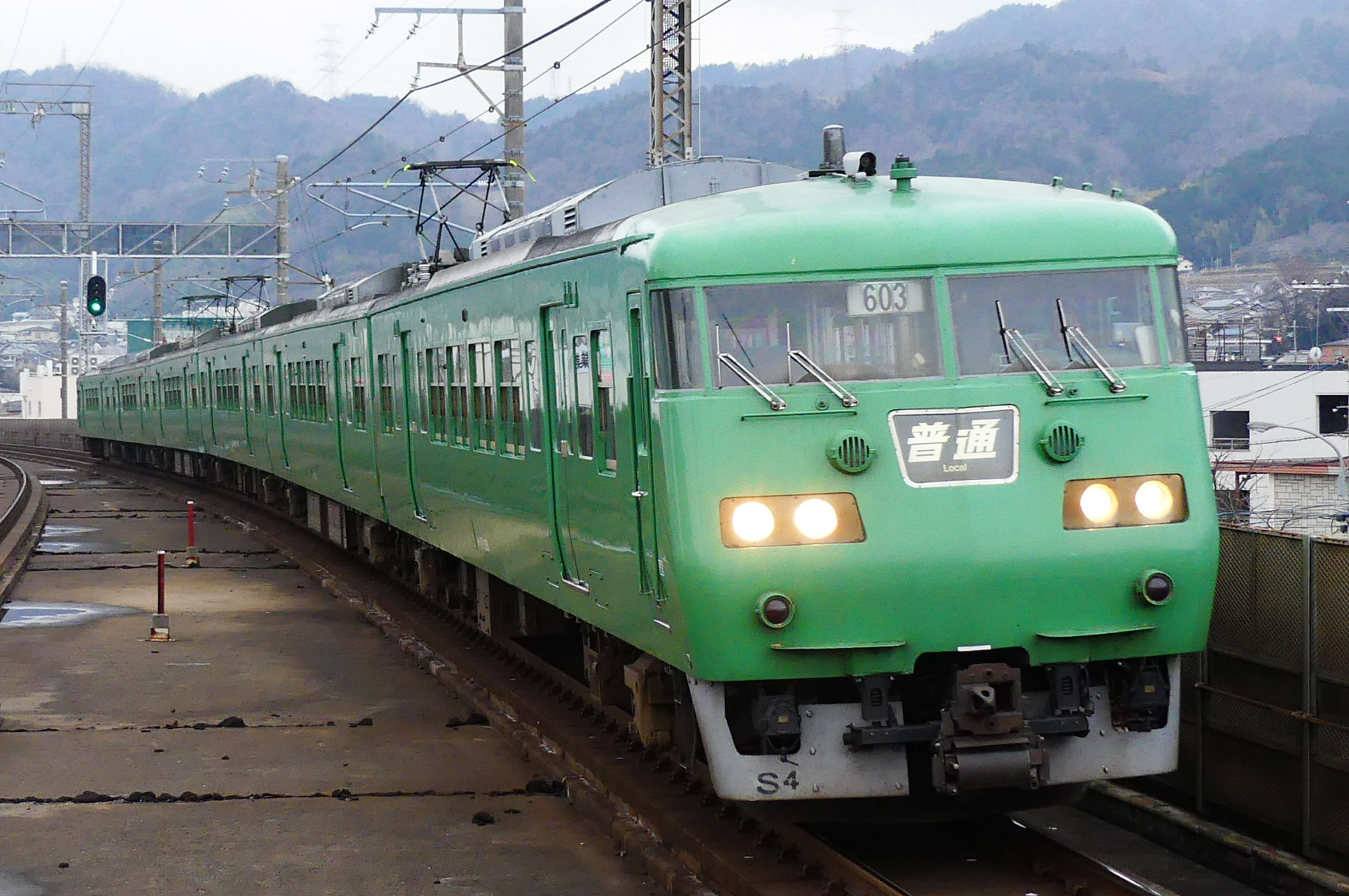
300 subseries in Kyōto area livery

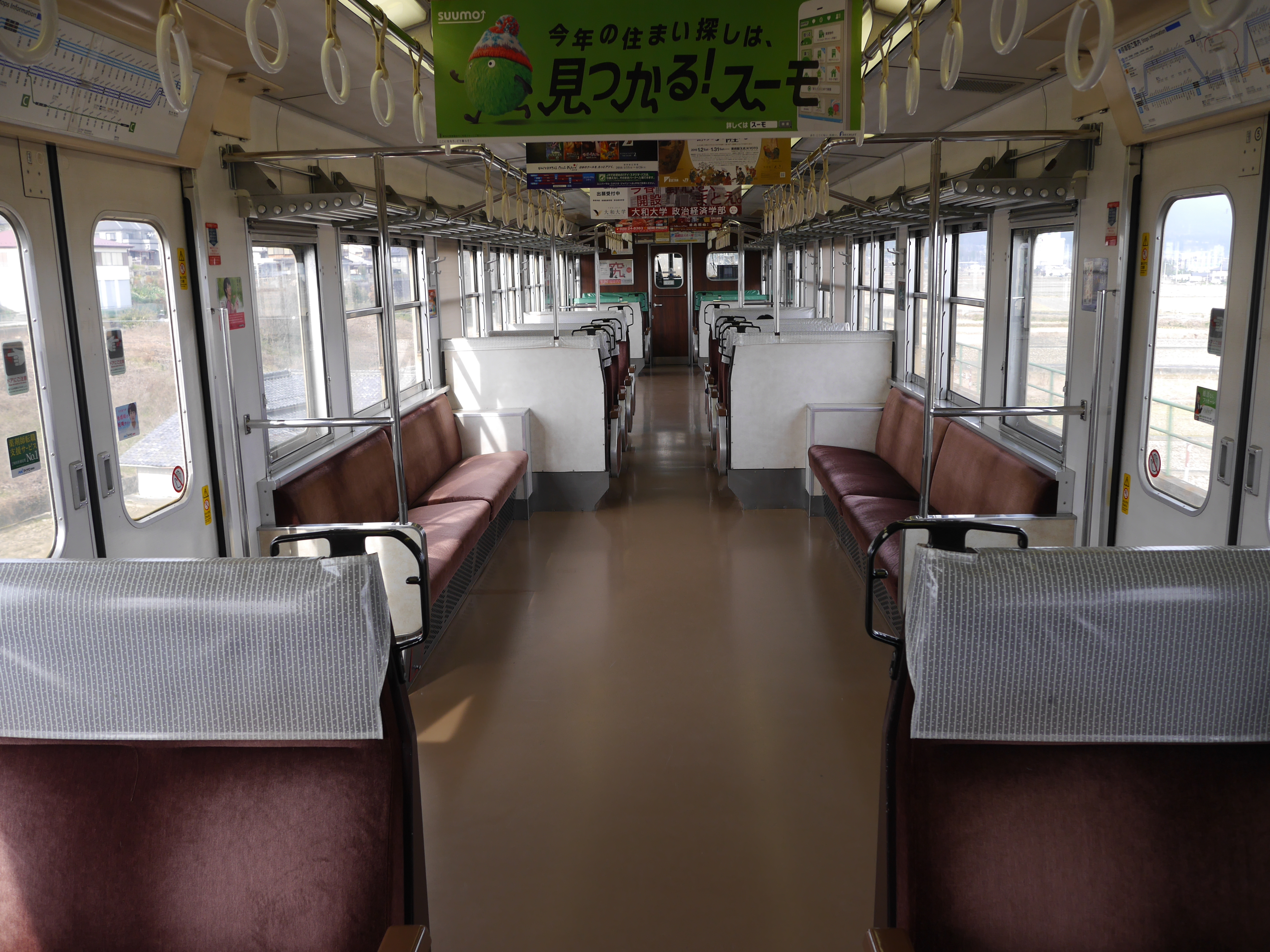
300 subseries interior

Having been displaced by the newer 221 series, from 1990 many of 117 series cars had been transferred to the Fukuchiyama Line. These cars retained their original numbers, but had 300 appended to them. Through 1992, 1993, and 1995, a total of 58 cars were refurbished and reassigned to JR-West's Miyahara Depot.

In order to increase the capacity of the cars and make boarding and alighting easier, transverse seating immediately inside the doors was converted to longitudinal seating. This helped to reduce the problem of rush hour trains being delayed due to the time needed for passengers to board and alight. Brakes were augmented, and the livery associated with the Fukuchiyama Line, white with green striping, appeared.

However, these modifications did not entirely solve the problems with passenger mobility during rush hour, and as a result, the 117-300s were used on outgoing services (bound for Fukuchiyama) and off-peak services. From April 2000, two 4-car sets were dispatched from Hineno Depot for operation on the Wakayama Line and the Kisei Main Line.

Sets which remained on the Fukuchiyama Line until the series' complete withdrawal from the line are now assigned to Kyoto Depot for operation on the Sanin Main Line (Sagano Line), Kosei Line, and Kusatsu Line. Some sets have ATS-P train control on board, others have MoHa cars made surplus by the creation of the shorter 100 sub-series sets.

300 sub-series renumbering

MoHa117/116-3 – 16, 19, 20, 41, 42 → MoHa117/116-303, 316, 319, 320, 341, 342
KuHa117/116-2 – 8, 10, 18, 20, 10 → KuHa117/116-302, 308, 310, 318, 320, 321

==== Reassignment to the Okayama Area ====
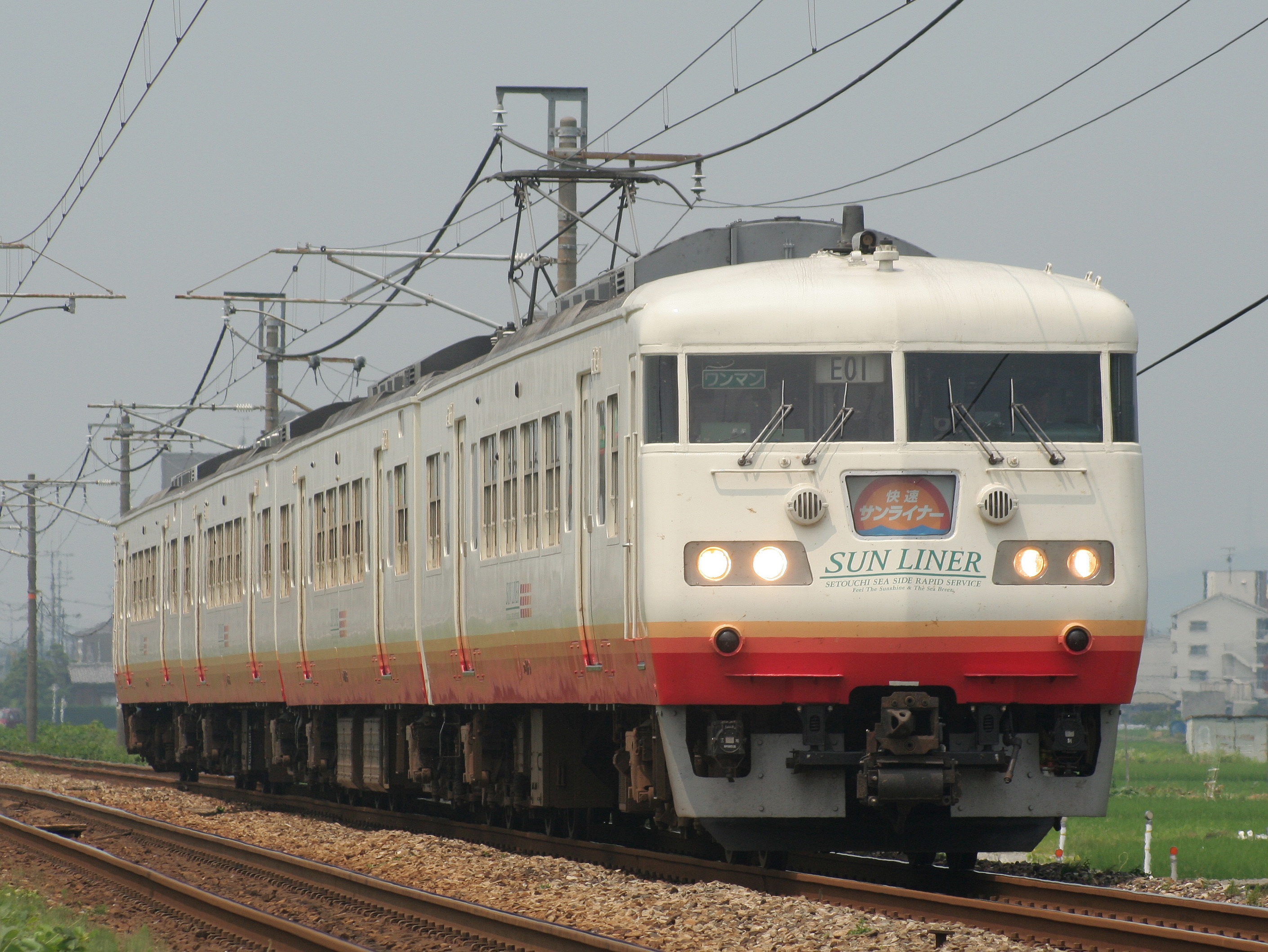
Sunliner rapid livery

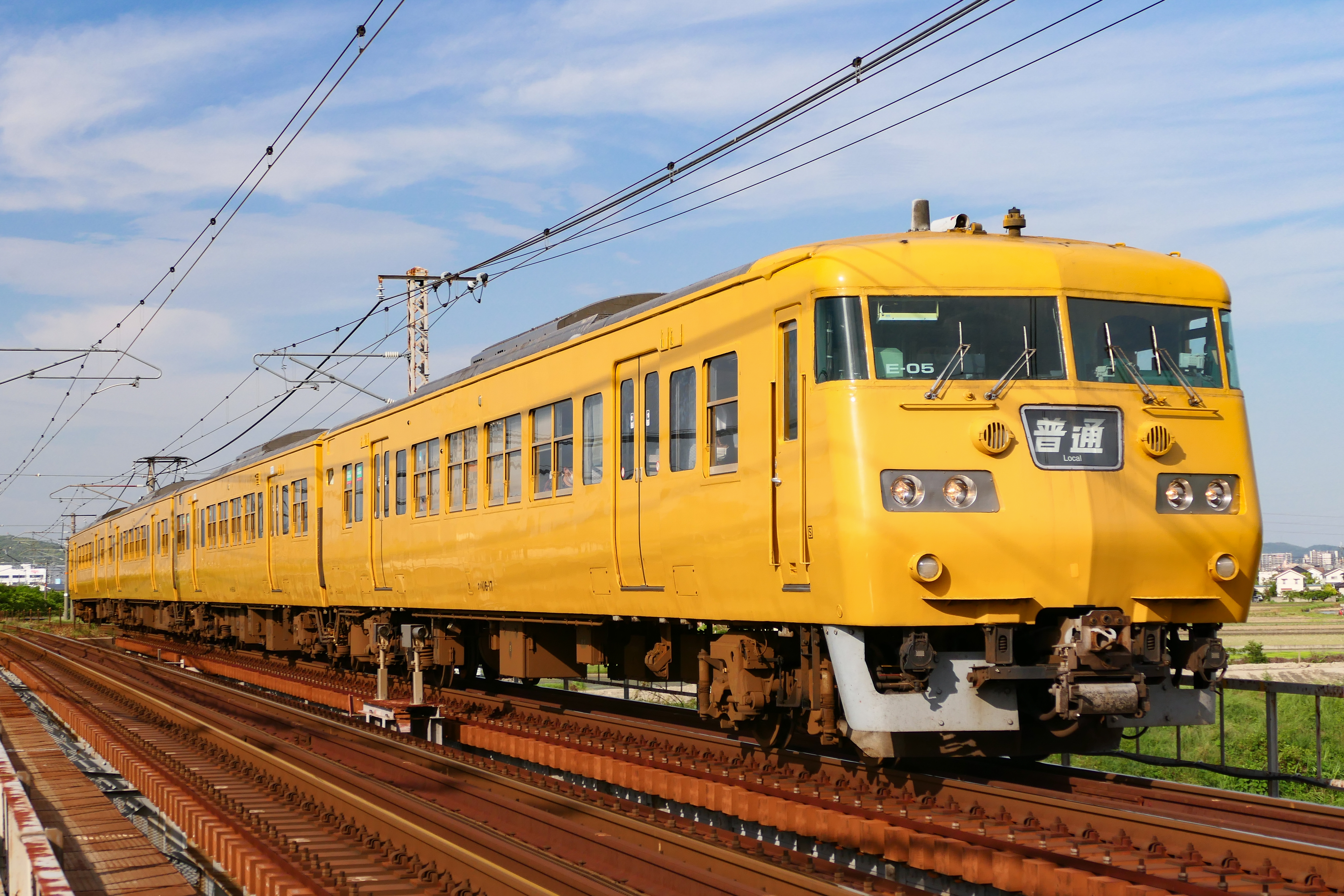
Setouchi area livery

In 1992, six 4-car sets were reassigned to Okayama Depot. At this time, the lavatories were upgraded and the Sunliner livery appeared, and some of these sets operated at speeds of 115 km/h (70 mph). In 1999, fare collection boxes were installed to support driver-only operation without a conductor on board. These consists were designated as:

E1: KuHa117-9 – MoHa117-18 – MoHa116-18 – KuHa116-9
E2: KuHa117-11 – MoHa117-22 – MoHa116-22 – KuHa116-11
E3: KuHa117-13 – MoHa117-26 – MoHa116-26 – KuHa116-13
E4: KuHa117-15 – MoHa117-30 – MoHa116-30 – KuHa116-15
E5: KuHa117-17 – MoHa117-34 – MoHa116-34 – KuHa116-17
E6: KuHa117-19 – MoHa117-38 – MoHa116-38 – KuHa116-19

Later, three 4-car sets were borrowed from the Miyahara Depot and designated E11, E12, and E13. These were used in the region on local services and also served as the primary units for Sunliner rapid service. These were run as far north as the Yonago area for special services during periods of high ridership. 100 sub-series cars at the Okayama Depot without upgraded lavatories were mothballed at the Gotō Depot in Yonago until reassignment to Shimonoseki in October 2005.

3500 sub-series renumbering

MoHa117/116-17, 21, 23, 25, 27, 29, 31, 33, 35, 37, 39, 303, 315, 316 → MoHa115/114-3501 – 3514

==== Reassignment to Kisei Main Line and Wakayama Line ====
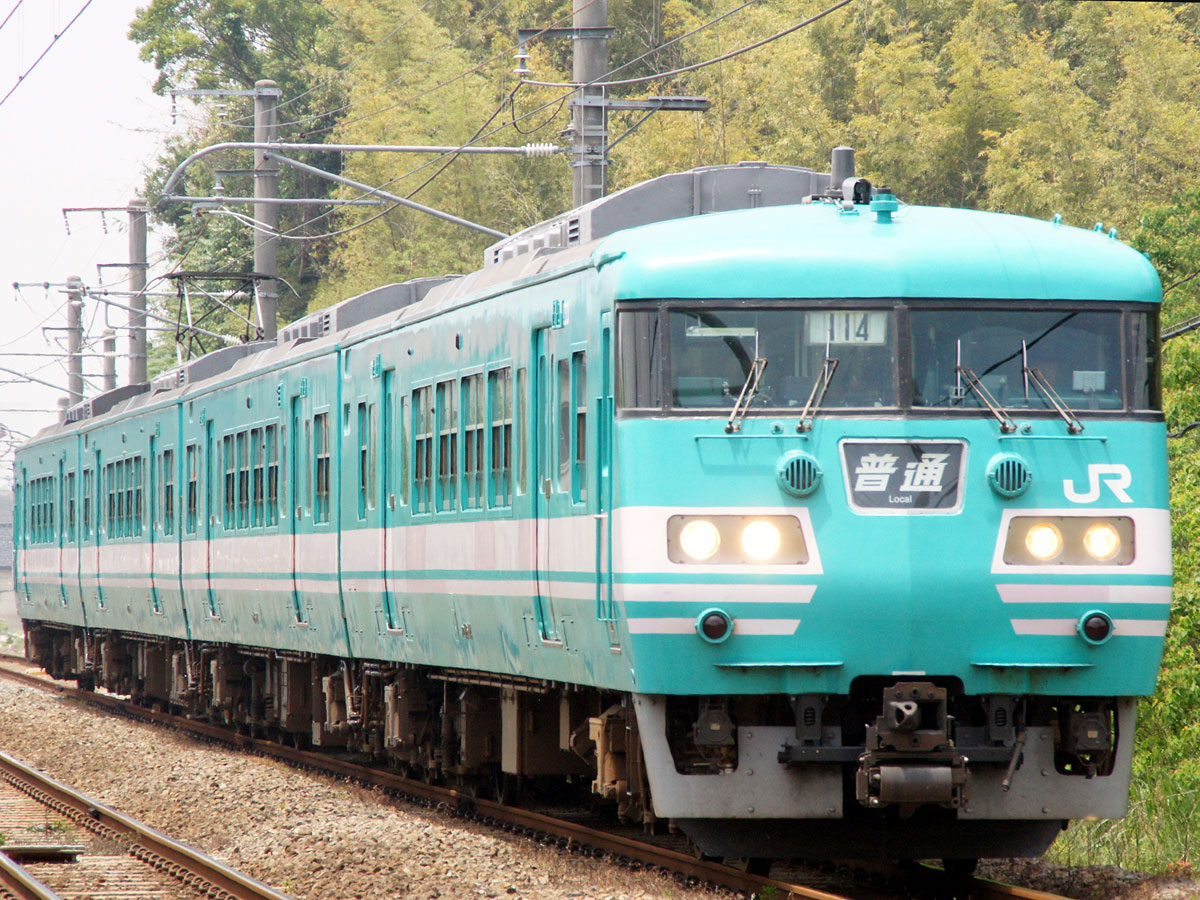
117 series in (Old) Wakayama livery

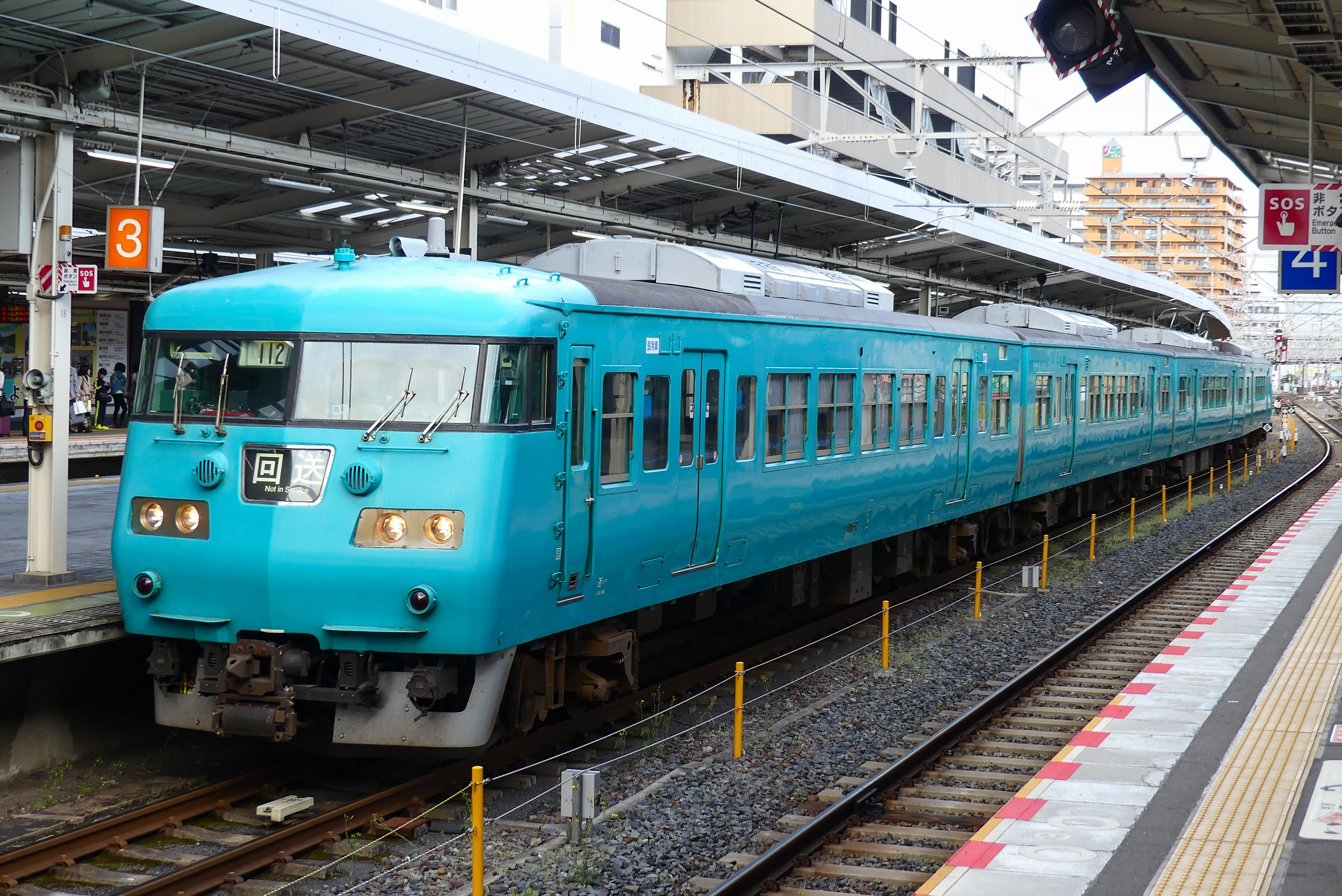
117 series in New Wakayama livery

In March 2000, two 4-car sets of 300 sub-series trains were reassigned to Hineno Depot for operation on the Wakayama Line. These sets were classified as G801 and G802. Until the reassignment, 113 series trains (sets G416 and G417) in the Shōnan green/orange livery were used for the line's morning rush services.

In March 2001, the 117 series trains assigned to Miyahara Depot were removed from the Nara Line's Miyakoji rapid service. One 6-car set from Miyahara Depot was reassigned to Hineno Depot as G803 and used to replace 113 series units out of service for inspection. In December of the same year, two surplus 300 subseries end cars and two MoHa units not in the G803 set were modified for driver-only operation and painted ocean green with a lavender stripe. These entered service as G804 in January 2002. Subsequently, all 117 sets received the same treatment.

In March 2002, Miyahara Depot's 4-car set C12 was returned from Shimonoseki to Hineno, and the inventory of five 4-car sets was complete. At this time, the operating area of the Hineno Depot 117s was enlarged on the Hanwa Line from Hineno Station to Wakayama Station, and on the Kisei Main Line from Wakayama Station to Kii-Tanabe Station.

In November 2002, after reassignment to Shin-Wakayama Depot, they were removed from service on the Hanwa Line and on the Kisei Main Line between Gobo and Kii-Tanabe. In August 2008, they were transferred back to Hineno Depot and are currently operating on the Wakayama Line.

117 series trains operating on the Kisei Main Line and Wakayama Lines are classified as:

G1(G805): KuHa117-12 – MoHa117-24 – MoHa116-24 – KuHa116-12
G2(G803): KuHa117-14 – MoHa117-28 – MoHa116-28 – KuHa116-14
G3(G804): KuHa117-308 – MoHa117-40 – MoHa116-40 – KuHa116-308
G4(G801): KuHa117-318 – MoHa117-305 – MoHa116-305 – KuHa116-318
G5(G802): KuHa117-320 – MoHa117-341 – MoHa116-341 – KuHa116-320

Numbers in parentheses were used by Hineno Depot until March 2002

=== JR Central ===
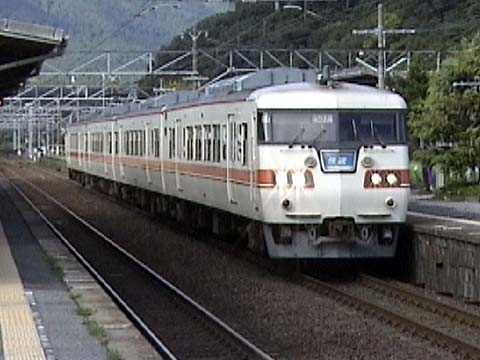
Original JR Central livery, Omi-Nagaoka Station, July 1999

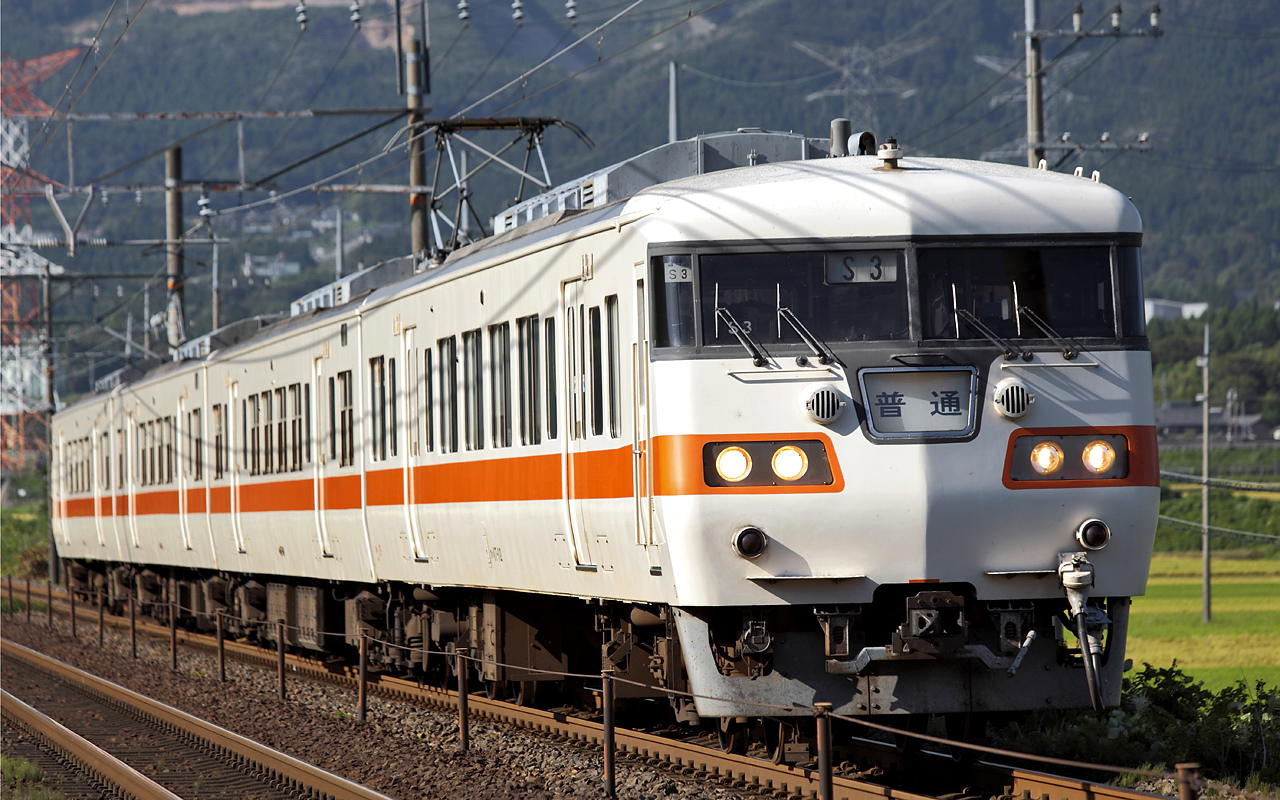
JR Central livery, 2009

Immediately after the privatization of JNR, the 117 series was JR Central's primary workhorse. However, replacement on the western Chūō West Line by the then-new 211-5000 series cars began in 1988, and all 117 series cars were reassigned to Ōgaki Depot. On the Tōkaidō Main Line, the 117 series was replaced on special rapid service by the 313 series. The maximum operating speed on the Tōkaidō Line was raised to 120 km/h (75 mph) in 1999.

Interiors had longitudinal seats installed at the ends of the cars and directly behind the driver's cab.

From October 2006, midday operation between Ōgaki and Maibara made up the majority of the 117 series' use by JR Central. From March 2008, departures from Okazaki Station on special rapid service increased.

From about 1999, all cars appeared in a simplified version of their previous livery. A single, thick orange stripe below the windows replaced a thin stripe on the rain gutter along the sides of the roof, a thick orange band below the windows, and a thin orange band immediately below that. The headboard, which originally had "Rapid" written in yellow on a white background, had a black border added to its lettering to improve legibility.

The remaining 117 series sets operated by JR Central were withdrawn from regular services by spring 2013, with the exception of the Joyful Train Train117 trainset.

== Joyful Train sets ==
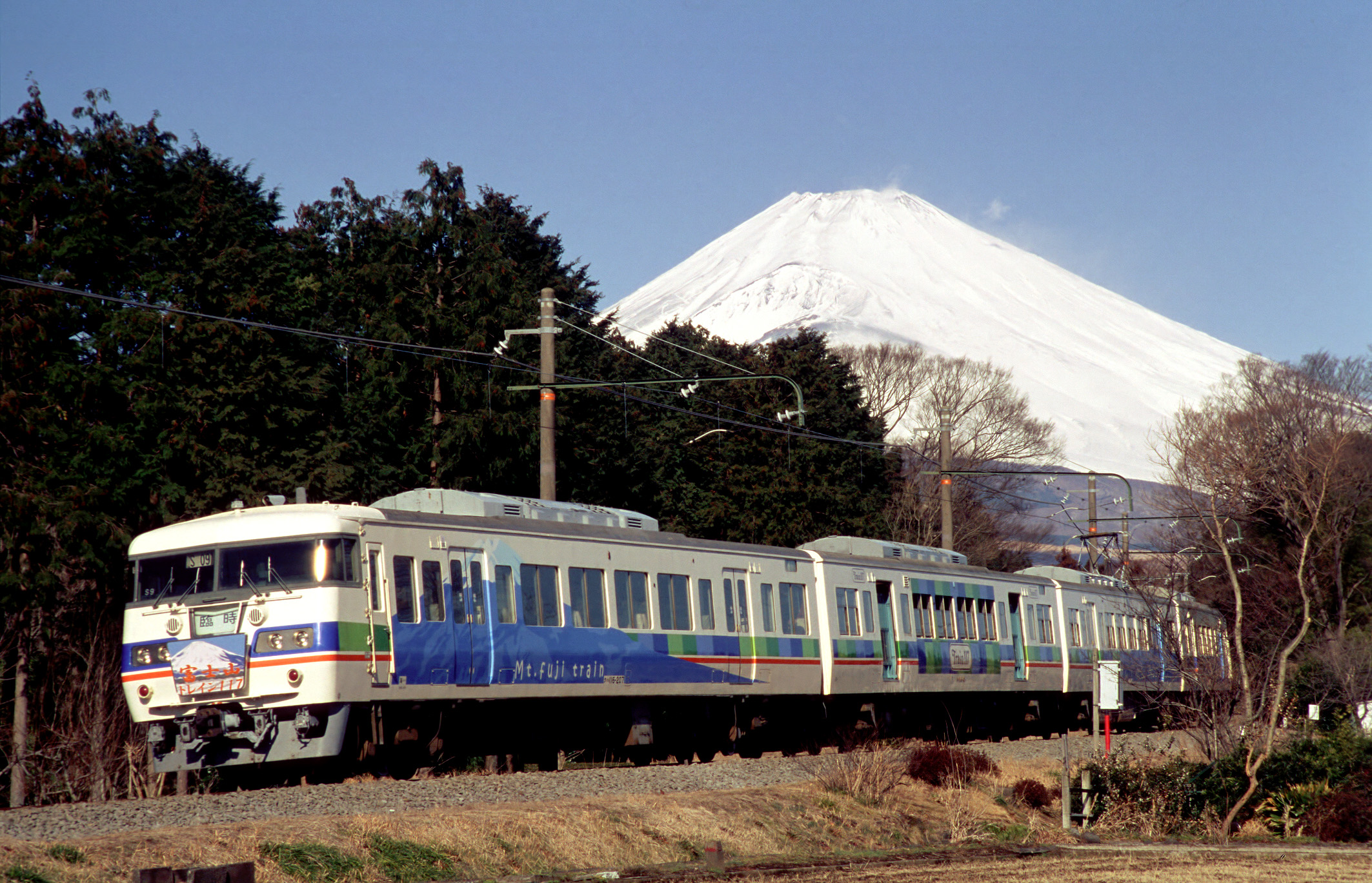
JR Central's Train117 in February 2012

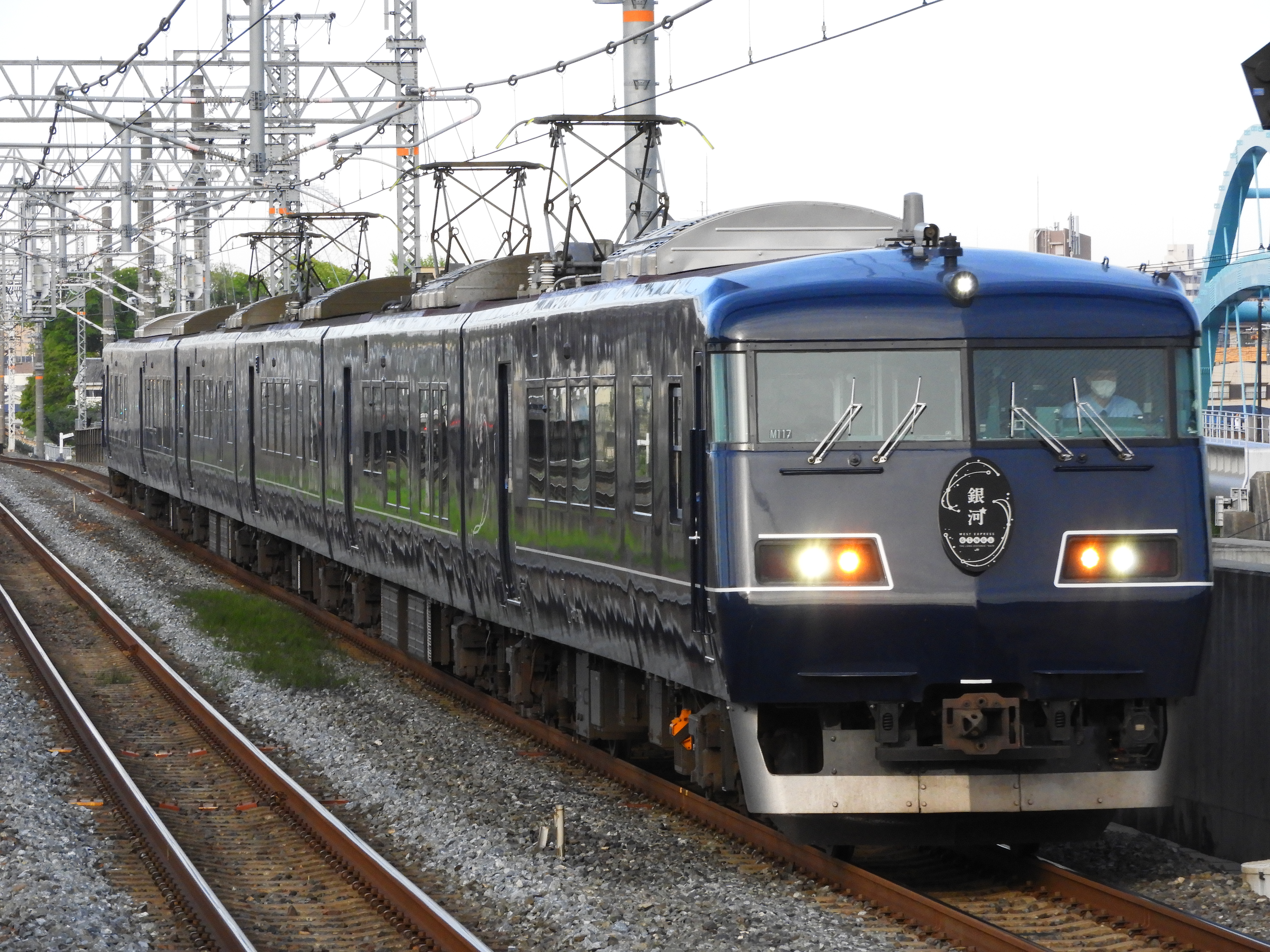
JR West's West Express Ginga in April 2021

- Train117: A modified four-car set, which entered service in 2010 and was withdrawn following its final run on 21 July 2013. Operated by JR Central and based at Ōgaki Depot.
- West Express Ginga: A modified six-car set, which had been planned for service in to begin in May 2020, but postponed indefinitely due to the COVID-19 pandemic, The Six-Car train entered service on September 1, 2020. Operated by JR West and based at Kyoto Depot.

== Livery variations ==
In February 2016, Okayama-based four-car Sun Liner set E-04 received a special "mt x Sun Liner" livery with a decorative masking tape motif. It is scheduled to carry this livery until the end of June 2016.

== Preserved examples ==
- KuHa 117-30: At SCMaglev and Railway Park, Nagoya, formerly displayed outside, which is now moved inside.
- MoHa 116-59 + KuHa 116-209: Formerly at the SC Maglev Railway Park, displayed outside with KuHa 117-30, removed in June 2019.
- KuHa 117-1: At Kyoto Railway Museum, Kyoto.
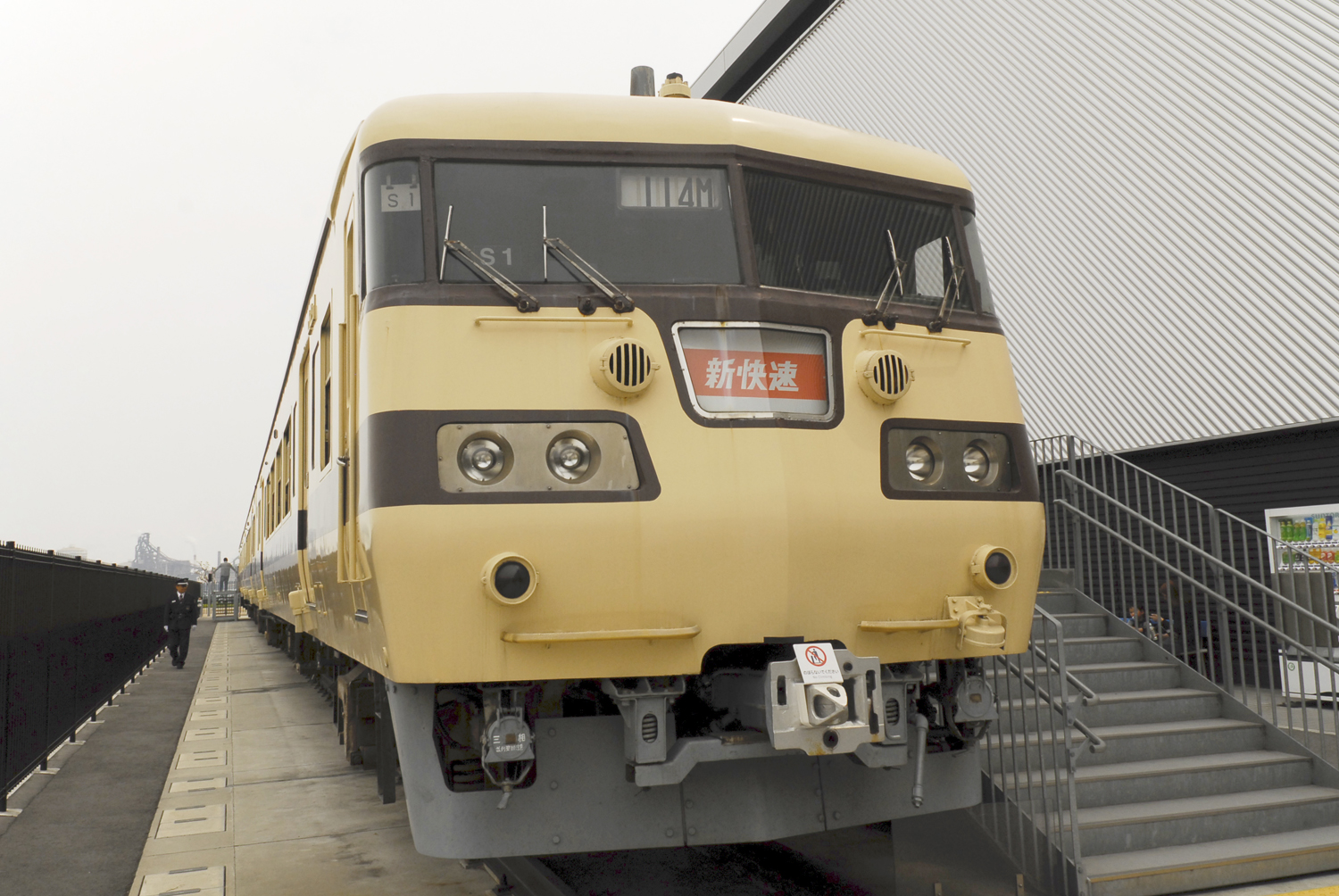
Preserved 117 series cars at the SCMaglev and Railway Park in April 2013
