= Kitauchi Station =

Railway station in Gojō, Nara Prefecture, Japan

Kitauchi-eki 北宇智駅
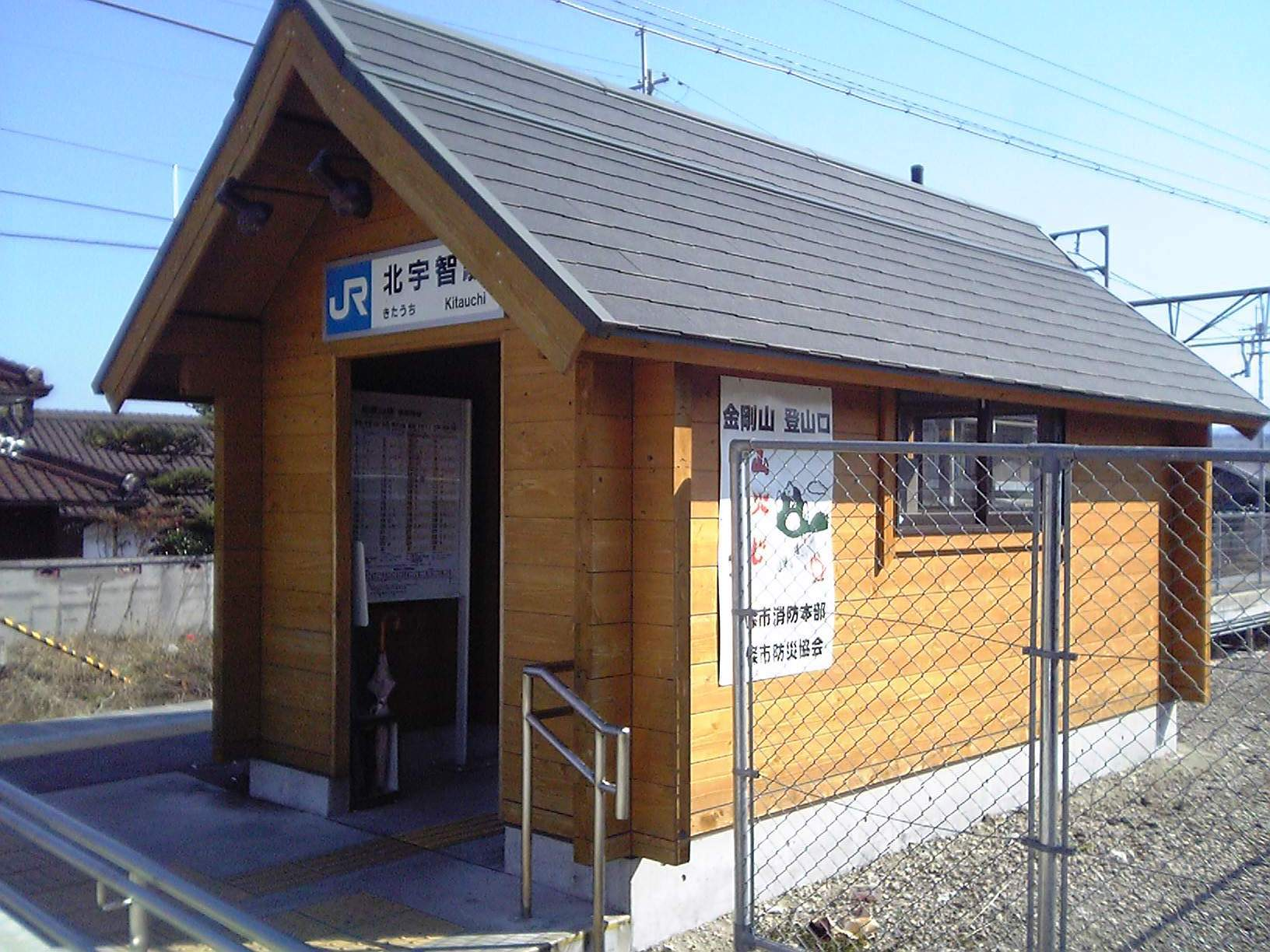
- Kitauchi Station—February 2010

General information
- Location: 589-4, Sugawa-chō, Gojō-shi, Nara-ken 637-0014; Japan
- Coordinates: 34°22′57″N 135°42′51″E
- System: JR-West commuter rail station
- Owner: West Japan Railway Company
- Operator: West Japan Railway Company
- Line: T Wakayama Line
- Distance: 35.4 km (22.0 miles) from Ōji
- Platforms: 1 side platform
- Tracks: 1
- Train operators: West Japan Railway Company
- Bus stands: 1
- Connections: Gojo City Community Bus B (Owa—Gojō Bus Center); Kanto Bus / Nara Kotsu Bus Lines Yamato-gō Shinjuku—Gojō Route at Sugawa; Nara Kotsu Bus Lines 60・66・70・161・Tokkyu (Limited Express) at Sugawa

Construction
- Structure type: At grade
- Parking: None
- Cycle facilities: Available
- Accessible: None

Other information
- Website: http://www.jr-odekake.net/eki/top.php?id=0621810

History
- Opened: 25 October 1896
- Electrified: 1980

Passengers
- 2019: 178 daily
Services
Preceding station	JR-West	Following station
T Wakayama Line
Gojō; Toward Wakayama and Kokawa	Local	Yoshinoguchi
Gojō; Terminus	Local	Yoshinoguchi
Gojō; Terminus	Regional Rapid Service	Yoshinoguchi; One-way
Gojō; One-way	Rapid Service (through to the Yamatoji Line)	Yoshinoguchi
Gojō; Terminus	Yamatoji Rapid Service	Yoshinoguchi; One-way
Location

Kitauchi Station (北宇智駅, Kitauchi-eki) is a passenger railway station in located in the city of Gojō, Nara Prefecture, Japan, operated by West Japan Railway Company (JR West).

== Lines ==
Kitauchi Station is served by the Wakayama Line, and is located 31.5 kilometers from the terminus of the line at Ōji.

== Station layout ==
The station is an above-ground station with one side platform on the left side of the station when facing towards Gojō. The station building is very simple with only a log cabin-style waiting room, inside which is an upright automatic ticket vending machine. The station is barrier-free, with ramps and handrails at the station entrance. It is an unattended station.

== History ==
Kitauchi Station opened on 25 October 1896 on the Nanwa Railway. The Ninwa Railway was absorbed by the Kansai Railway in 1904 and was nationalized in 1907. With the privatization of the Japan National Railways (JNR) on April 1, 1987, the station came under the aegis of the West Japan Railway Company.

== Passenger statistics ==
In fiscal 2019, the station was used by an average of 178 passengers daily (boarding passengers only).

== Surrounding Area ==
- Gojo Municipal Kitauchi Elementary School
- Kitauchi Gymnasium
- Kitauchi Community Center
- Techno Park Nara (industrial complex)

== See also ==
- List of railway stations in Japan
