= Gojō Station (Nara) =

Railway station in Gojō, Nara Prefecture, Japan

Gojō Station 五条駅
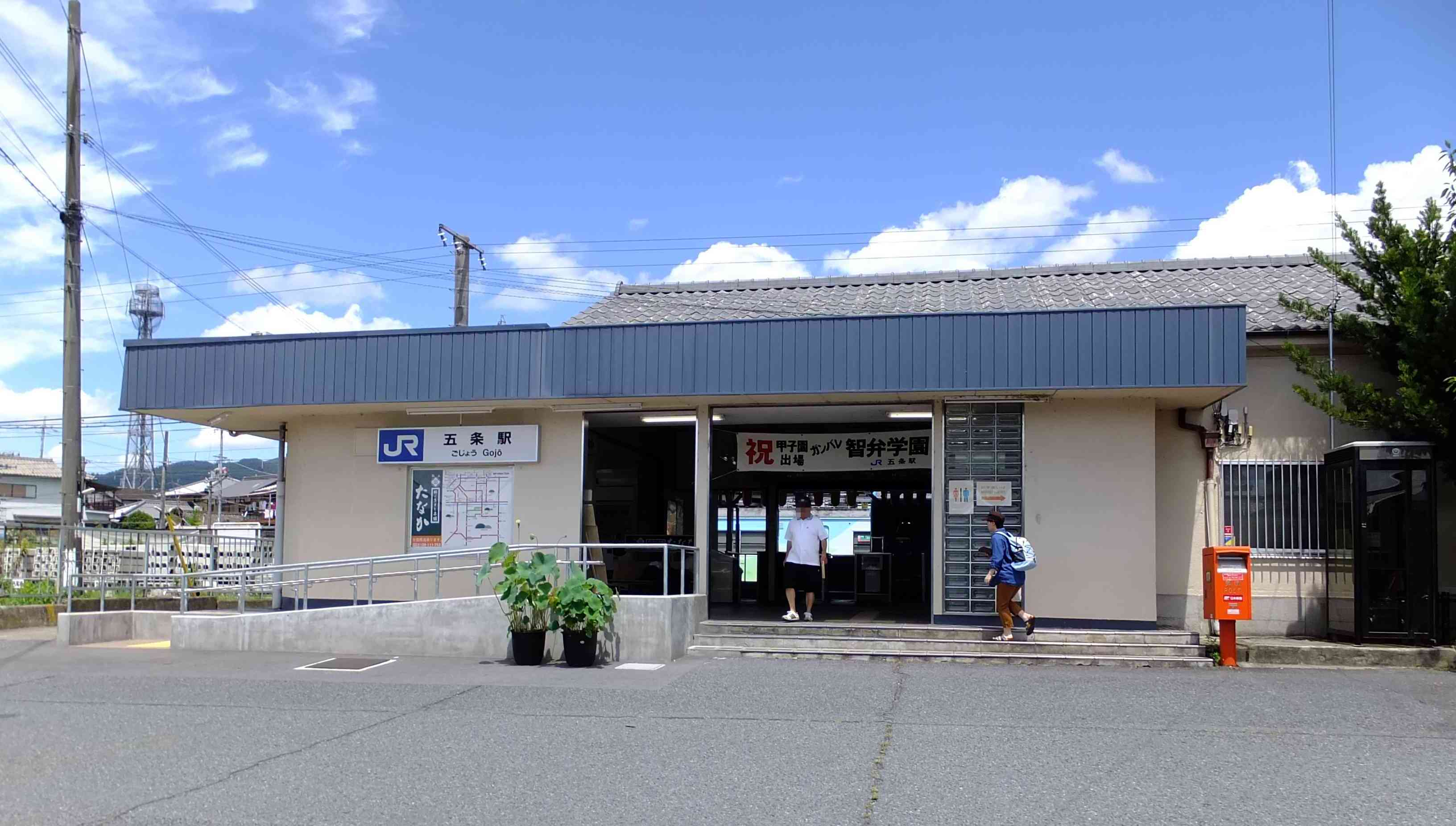
- Gojō Station

General information
- Location: 1-91, Sue 3-chōme, Gojō-shi, Nara-ken 637-0005; Japan
- Coordinates: 34°21′20″N 135°41′55″E
- System: JR-West commuter rail station
- Owner: West Japan Railway Company
- Operator: JR West Koutsu Service
- Line: T Wakayama Line
- Distance: 35.4 km (22.0 miles) from Ōji
- Platforms: 1 side+ 2 island platforms
- Tracks: 4
- Train operators: West Japan Railway Company
- Bus stands: 2
- Connections: Kanto Bus / Nara Kotsu Bus Lines Yamato-gō Shinjuku—Gojō Route; Nara Kotsu Bus Lines 1・10・11・31・32・56・57・56・Tokkyu (Limited Express)・Bun-kyūko (School Express)・Bun (School); Gojo City Community Bus C (Hatakeda—Gojō Bus Center)

Construction
- Structure type: At grade
- Parking: None
- Cycle facilities: Available

Other information
- Website: http://www.jr-odekake.net/eki/top.php?id=0621811

History
- Opened: 25 October 1896
- Electrified: 1980

Passengers
- 2019: 984 daily
Services
Preceding station	JR-West	Following station
T Wakayama Line
Yamato-Futami toward Wakayama and Kokawa	Local	Kitauchi toward Nara, Ōji, and Takada
Yamato-Futami toward Wakayama and Kokawa	Local	Terminus
Terminus	Local	Kitauchi toward Nara, Ōji, and Takada
Terminus	Regional Rapid Service	Kitauchi; One-way
Yamato-Futami toward Wakayama	Rapid Service; Local from Gojō	Kitauchi toward Nara and Takada
Terminus	Rapid Service	Kitauchi toward JR Namba
Terminus	Yamatoji Rapid Service	Kitauchi; One-way
Location

Gojō Station (五条駅, Gojō-eki) is a passenger railway station in located in the city of Gojō, Nara Prefecture, Japan, operated by West Japan Railway Company (JR West).

== Lines ==
Gojō Station is served by the Wakayama Line, and is located 35.4 kilometers from the terminus of the line at Ōji.

== Station layout ==
The station is an above-ground station with one side platform and one island platform connected by an underground passage. The platforms can accommodate trains of up to 10 carriages. The station building is basically made of wood, but the entrance has been expanded with concrete, making it a mixed building of wood and concrete. The station is staffed.

=== Platforms ===
1, 2, 3	■ T Wakayama Line	for Hashimoto and Wakayama for Takada and Ōji

== History ==
Gojō Station opened on 25 October 1896 when the Nanwa Railway began operations between Katsura Station (current Yoshinoguchi Station) and Futami Station (later Kawabata Station). The Nanwa Railway was absorbed by the Kansai Railway in 1904 and was nationalized in 1907. With the privatization of the Japan National Railways (JNR) on April 1, 1987, the station came under the aegis of the West Japan Railway Company.

== Passenger statistics ==
In fiscal 2019, the station was used by an average of 984 passengers daily (boarding passengers only).

== Surrounding Area ==
- Gojō city office
- Gojō police station
- Gojō Bus Center
- Eizanji Temple
- Yunomine Onsen
- Totsukawa Onsen
- Japan National Route 24

== See also ==
- List of railway stations in Japan
