= 大谷駅 =

大谷駅 or 大谷驛 may refer to:

- Daegok station (disambiguation)
  - Daegok station (Daegu Metro)
  - Daegok station (Goyang)
- Ōtani Station (disambiguation)
  - Ōtani Station (Shiga)
  - Ōtani Station (Wakayama)
- Ōyakaigan Station, also called as Ōya Station
