= Ryumon Yasuda =

Japanese artist (1891–1965)

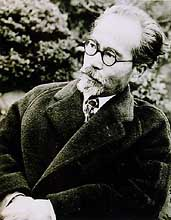
- Ryumon Yasuda in 1954, at the age 63
- Born: Jūemon Yasuda; May 13, 1891; Ryūmon Village, Naga District, Wakayama, Japan
- Died: February 14, 1965 (aged 73); Sakai, Osaka, Japan
- Known for: Sculpture, drawing
- Notable work: Minakata Kumagusu Zou, 1965 Haha to Ko, 1917; Ishida-shi no Zou; Kiyo Bank Nagoya-shi Heiwa-do Ritsuzou

Ryumon Yasuda (保田 龍門, Yasuda Ryūmon; May 13, 1891 – February 14, 1965) was a Japanese painter and sculptor.

== Biography ==
Yasuda was born as Jūemon Yasuda in Ryūmon Village, Naga District (now Kinokawa City) in Wakayama Prefecture, Japan in 1891.

He was inspired to pursue arts after seeing Hishida Shunsō's "The Fallen Leaves" at an art exhibition by the Ministry of Education, known as Bunten, held in Ueno, Tokyo. He went on to undertake studies in painting at the Pacific Ocean Picture Association Laboratory and entered Tōkyō Bijutsu Gakkō (present-day Tokyo University of the Arts), Department of Western Pictures in 1912.

While attending school he submitted an artwork for the Nikaten Arts Exhibition and was selected. At the 11th Kaibunten in 1917 (Taishō 6), he received a special prize for his piece "Mother and Child". Afterwards, he began studying sculptures at the Nihon Bijutsuin Institute and thereafter the Nihon Bijutsuin Exhibition became an outlet for his works.

Yasuda visited the United States of America in 1920, and then travelled to Paris via San Francisco and New York City the next year. He was taught sculpture under the guidance of Bourdelle, who was the assistant of Rodin. He visited various places of interest in Europe including the atelier of Aristide Maillol in southern France during his time abroad.

After learning of his mother's death, Yasuda returned to Japan in 1923. After he returned home, he stopped production in Tokyo and built a studio designed by Isaku Nishimura in his hometown of Wakayama, moving the base of operations there before moving permanently to Sakai, Osaka. Yasuda exhibited profound influence on the art world of Kansai, going on to teach the next generation of artists after World War II at the Institute of Osaka City Art, Wakayama University.

He died in 1965 at the age of 73.

== Timeline ==
- 1912 Entered Tōkyō Bijutsu Gakkō (Present: Tokyo University of the Arts), Department of Western Picture.
- 1915 His entry into the Nikaten Arts Exhibition is selected.
- 1917 Began studying sculptures in Nihon Bijutsuin after graduation from Western Picture Department (Present: Tokyo University of the Arts). "Mother And Child", his piece for graduation, is exhibited in the 11th Bunten and specially selected for an award.
- 1918 "Mr. Ishida's Image" is exhibited in the 5th Nihon Bijutsuin Exhibition (Inten), and wins the Chogyu prize.
- 1920 Apon recommendation, he sets sail from Yokohama port to study abroad.
- 1924 Held "A Visit to Europe Memory Exhibition" at the Tokugawa residence in Tokyo, exhibiting 59 oil paintings and 13 sculptures.
- 1946 Became a professor at the Sculpture Department of Osaka City Museum of Fine Arts.
- 1953 Received the production of 4 wall reliefs from the Kiyo Bank head office. In February, became a professor at the Faculty of Arts and Sciences, Wakayama University (currently the Faculty of Education).
- 1954 Completes the 4-part work 紀陽銀行本店の壁面レリーフ.
- 1958 Completes 名古屋市平和堂立像

== Exhibitions ==
- 1969: Exhibition of Ryumon Yasuda (The Museum of Modern Art, Wakayama)
- 1986: Sketch of Ryumon Yasuda exhibition (Buffet Five Art Gallery, Kainan City, and Wakayama City)
- 1988: Posthumous work of Ryumon Yasuda exhibition (Buffet Five Art Gallery, Kainan City and Wakayama City)
- 1994: Taisho no Manazashi "Young Ryumon Yasuda and his days" (The Museum of Modern Art, Wakayama)
- 1997: Ryumon exhibition of Ryumon pavilion (Sponsoring: Buffet Five Art Gallery, Kokawa)
- 1998: Ryumon Yasuda "A painting in India ink" exhibition (Buffet Five Art Gallery, Kainan City, and Wakayama City)
- 2002: Ryumon Yasuda "Generation Atelier Exhibition" (Buffet Five Art Gallery, Kainan City)
- 2005: Ryumon Yasuda exhibition to live in birthplace (Buffet Five Art Gallery, Kainan City)
