= Katsuragi, Wakayama =

Katsuragi かつらぎ町
- Town
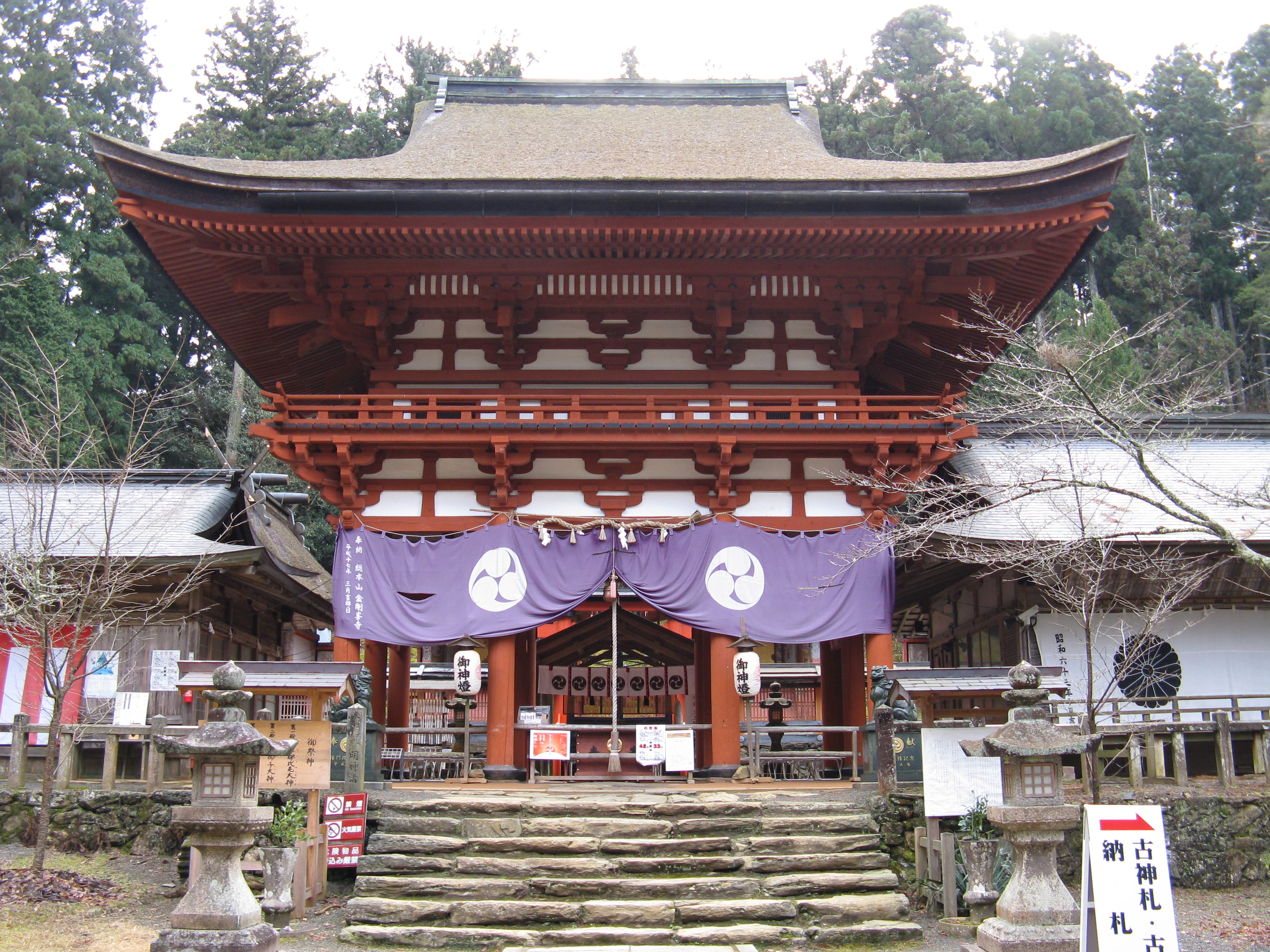
- Niutsuhime Shrine in Katsuragi

- Flag Emblem

- Location of Katsuragi in Wakayama Prefecture

- Location in Japan
- Coordinates: 34°18′N 135°30′E
- Country: Japan
- Region: Kansai
- Prefecture: Wakayama
- District: Ito

Area
  - Total: 151.69 km^{2} (58.57 sq mi)

Population (November 30, 2021)
  - Total: 16,170
  - Density: 106.6/km^{2} (276.1/sq mi)
- Time zone: UTC+09:00 (JST)
- City hall address: 2160 Chonomachi, Katsuragi-cho, Ito-gun, Wakayama-ken 649-7192
- Climate: Cfa
- Website: Official website
- Symbols
- Flower: Hydrangea macrophylla
- Tree: Osmanthus

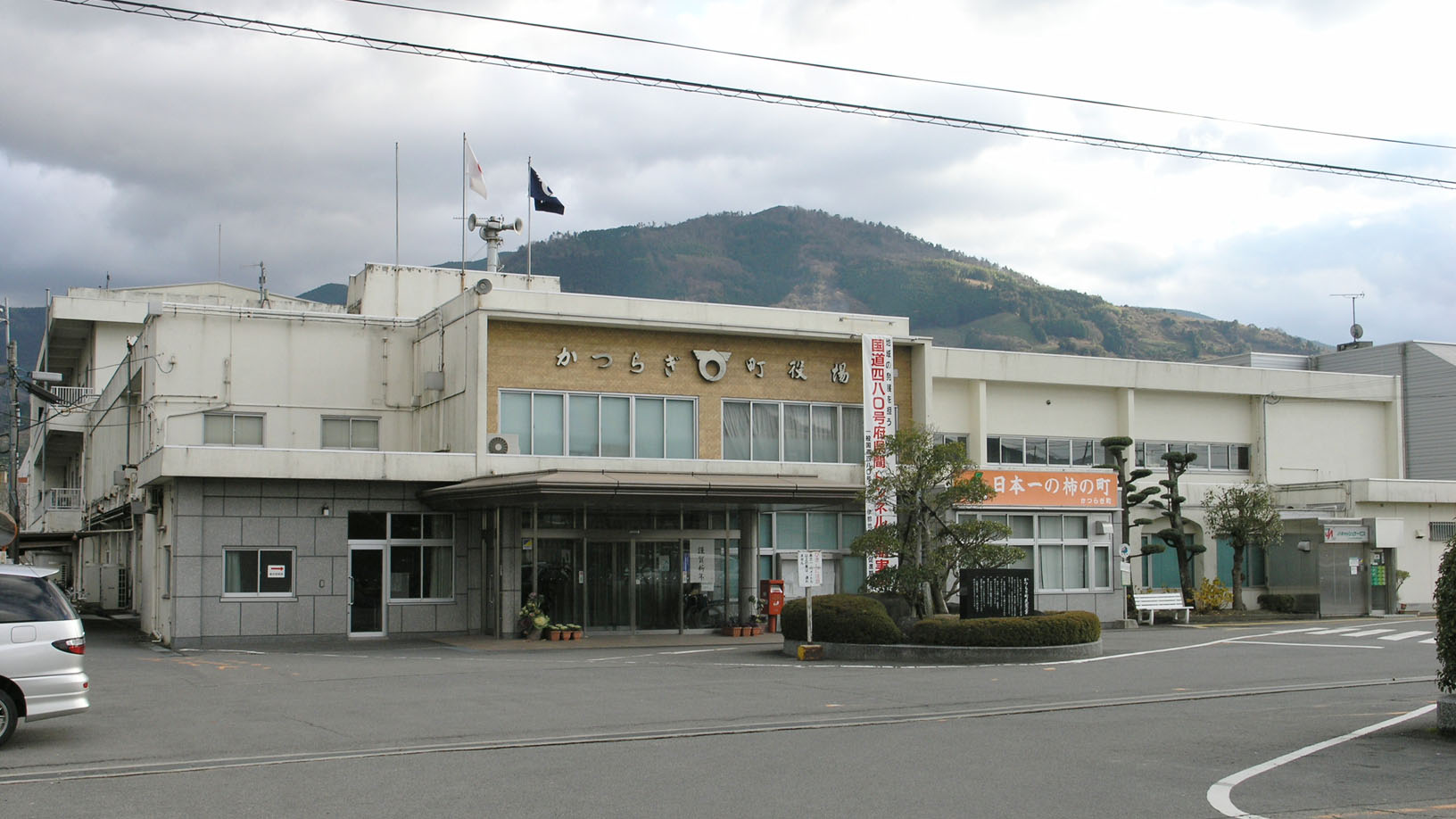
Katsuragi Town Hall

Katsuragi (かつらぎ町, Katsuragi-chō) is a town located in Ito District, Wakayama Prefecture, Japan. As of 30 November 2021, the town had an estimated population of 16,170 in 7137 households and a population density of 110 persons per km^{2}. The total area of the town is 151.69 square kilometres (58.57 sq mi). The town was named after the nearby Katsuragi Mountains.

== Geography ==
Katsuragi is long and narrow from north to south, and is located in the northeastern part of Wakayama prefecture. The Kinokawa River flows from east to west in the former Katsuragi Town area, and the Kishi River flows from east to west in the Shinshiro area at the southernmost tip of the former Katsuragi Town. In addition, the Arita River runs through the former Hanazono village area. The terrain is sandwiched between the Kii Mountains and the Izumi Mountains, forming a basin.

=== Neighboring municipalities ===
Wakayama Prefecture

- Hashimoto
- Kinokawa
- Kudoyama
- Kōya
- Kimino
- Aridagawa

Osaka Prefecture

- Kawachinagano
- Izumi
- Kishiwada

Nara Prefecture

- Nosegawa

=== Climate ===
Katsuragi has a humid subtropical climate (Köppen Cfa) characterized by warm summers and cool winters with light to no snowfall. The average annual temperature in Katsuragi is 13.7 °C. The average annual rainfall is 1771 mm with September as the wettest month. The temperatures are highest on average in August, at around 25.4 °C, and lowest in January, at around 2.3 °C. The area is subject to typhoons in summer.

Climate data for Katsuragi (1991−2020 normals, extremes 1979−present)
Month	Jan	Feb	Mar	Apr	May	Jun	Jul	Aug	Sep	Oct	Nov	Dec	Year
Record high °C (°F)	18.6 (65.5)	22.0 (71.6)	25.3 (77.5)	30.1 (86.2)	32.7 (90.9)	35.8 (96.4)	38.2 (100.8)	40.6 (105.1)	37.9 (100.2)	32.4 (90.3)	27.5 (81.5)	25.7 (78.3)	40.6 (105.1)
Mean daily maximum °C (°F)	8.8 (47.8)	10.0 (50.0)	14.0 (57.2)	19.8 (67.6)	24.6 (76.3)	27.3 (81.1)	31.2 (88.2)	33.0 (91.4)	28.5 (83.3)	22.5 (72.5)	16.7 (62.1)	11.2 (52.2)	20.6 (69.1)
Daily mean °C (°F)	3.8 (38.8)	4.5 (40.1)	7.9 (46.2)	13.2 (55.8)	17.9 (64.2)	21.6 (70.9)	25.5 (77.9)	26.5 (79.7)	22.6 (72.7)	16.6 (61.9)	11.0 (51.8)	6.0 (42.8)	14.8 (58.6)
Mean daily minimum °C (°F)	−0.3 (31.5)	−0.2 (31.6)	2.4 (36.3)	7.1 (44.8)	12.1 (53.8)	17.1 (62.8)	21.4 (70.5)	21.9 (71.4)	18.2 (64.8)	12.1 (53.8)	6.3 (43.3)	1.8 (35.2)	10.0 (50.0)
Record low °C (°F)	−5.9 (21.4)	−6.3 (20.7)	−4.1 (24.6)	−2.0 (28.4)	2.3 (36.1)	7.8 (46.0)	14.2 (57.6)	14.6 (58.3)	8.1 (46.6)	2.0 (35.6)	−1.3 (29.7)	−4.7 (23.5)	−6.3 (20.7)
Average precipitation mm (inches)	59.9 (2.36)	72.2 (2.84)	111.0 (4.37)	105.9 (4.17)	146.5 (5.77)	196.2 (7.72)	184.6 (7.27)	123.2 (4.85)	166.2 (6.54)	149.8 (5.90)	86.5 (3.41)	62.1 (2.44)	1,464 (57.64)
Average precipitation days (≥ 1.0 mm)	8.2	8.6	10.9	10.1	9.9	12.3	10.9	7.9	10.5	9.9	7.8	8.5	115.5
Mean monthly sunshine hours	104.5	119.7	159.9	188.7	200.3	144.7	180.4	221.5	155.7	151.3	135.5	112.0	1,874.1
Source: Japan Meteorological Agency

== Demographics ==
Per Japanese census data, the population of Katsuragi has decreased steadily over the past 70 years.

Historical population
Year	Pop.	±%
1920	23,967	—
1930	24,718	+3.1%
1940	23,680	−4.2%
1950	28,859	+21.9%
1960	26,411	−8.5%
1970	25,258	−4.4%
1980	24,496	−3.0%
1990	22,764	−7.1%
2000	20,945	−8.0%
2010	18,228	−13.0%

== History ==
The town of Katsuragi was founded by the merger of the town of Ito and Myōji and the village of Miyoshi (all from Ito District) on July 1, 1958. On October 1, 2005, the village of Hanazono, from Ito District, was merged into Katsuragi.

== Government ==
Katsuragi has a mayor-council form of government with a directly elected mayor and a unicameral town council of 14 members. Katsuragi, collectively with the other municipalities of Ito District contributes one member to the Wakayama Prefectural Assembly. In terms of national politics, the town is part of Wakayama 2nd district of the lower house of the Diet of Japan.

== Economy ==
Katsuragi is one of the largest agricultural areas in Wakayama, and agriculture, horticulture and food processing dominate the local economy.

== Education ==
Katsuragi has five public elementary schools and two public middle schools operated by the town government and two public high schools operated by the Wakayama Prefectural Department of Education.

== Transportation ==
=== Railway ===
JR West – Wakayama Line

- Nakaiburi - Myōji - Ōtani - Kaseda - Nishi-Kaseda

=== Highway ===
- Keinawa Expressway
- National Route 24
- National Route 370
- National Route 371
- National Route 480

== Local attractions ==
- Niutsuhime Shrine, National Historic Site and World Heritage Site
- Kōyasan chōishi-michi, National Historic Site and World Heritage Site

== Notable people from Katsuragi ==
- Hirofumi Hirano, politician
- Nenji Kobayashi, actor
