= Nakaiburi Station =

Railway station in Katsuragi, Wakayama Prefecture, Japan

Nakaiburi Station 中飯降駅
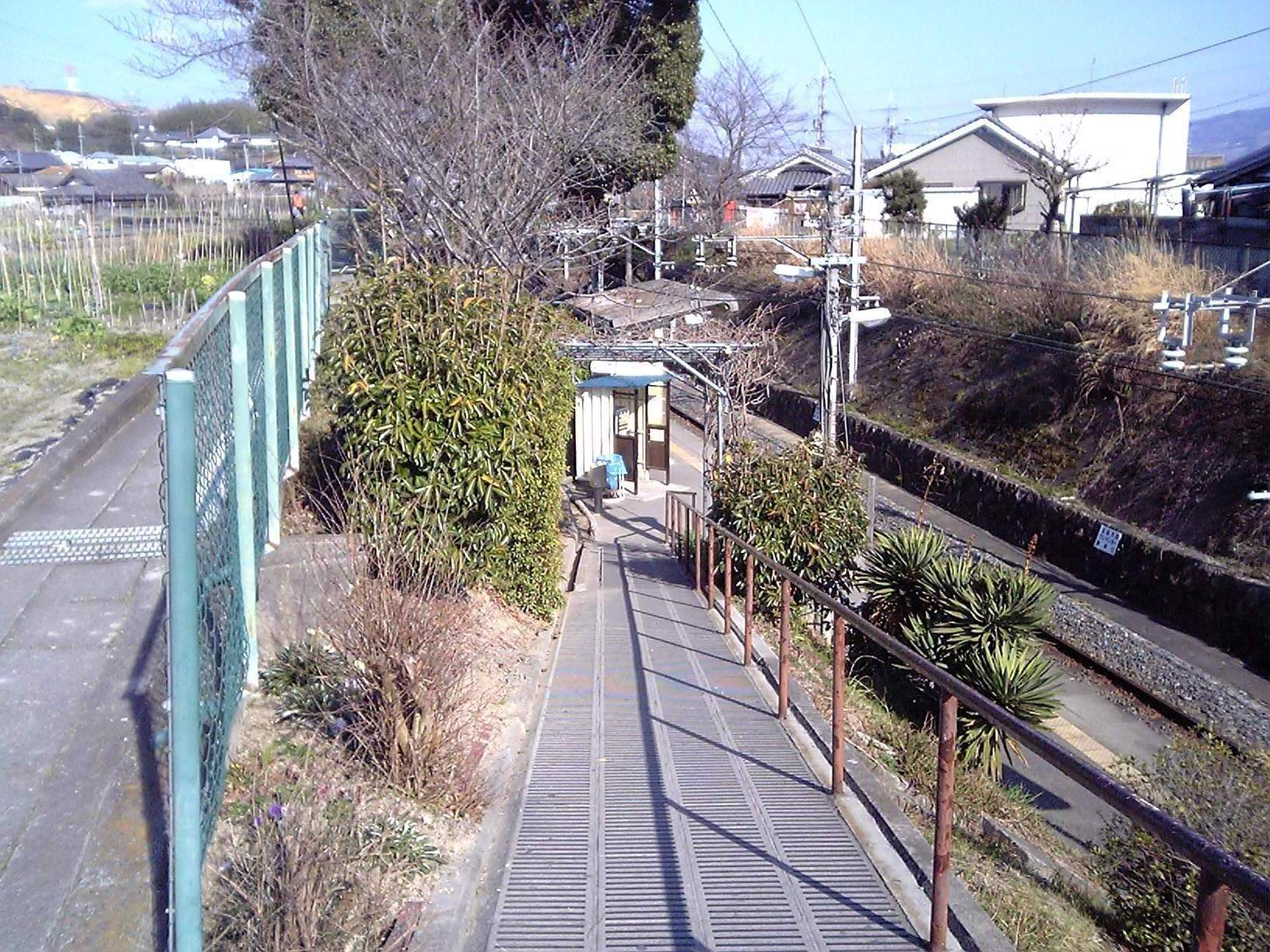
- Nakaiburi Station, February 2010

General information
- Location: 231-2 Nakaiburi, Katsuragi-cho, Ito-gun, Wakayama-ken 649-7112; Japan
- Coordinates: 34°18′15.32″N 135°31′55.05″E
- System: JR-West commuter rail station
- Owner: West Japan Railway Company
- Operator: West Japan Railway Company
- Line: T Wakayama Line
- Distance: 53.0 km (32.9 miles) from Ōji
- Platforms: 1 side platform
- Tracks: 1
- Train operators: West Japan Railway Company

Other information
- Status: Unstaffed
- Website: Official website

History
- Opened: 1 May 1957

Passengers
- FY2019: 344 daily
Services
Preceding station	JR-West	Following station
Wakayama Line
Kōyaguchi	Rapid Service	Myōji
Kōyaguchi	Local	Myōji
Location
- Location within Wakayama Prefecture Location within Japan

Nakaiburi Station (中飯降駅, Nakaiburi-eki) is a passenger railway station in located in the town of Katsuragi, Wakayama Prefecture, Japan, operated by West Japan Railway Company (JR West).

== Lines ==
Nakaiburi Station is served by the Wakayama Line, and is located 53.0 kilometers from the terminus of the line at Ōji Station.

== Station layout ==
The station consists of one side platform serving a single bi-directional track. There is no station building, and the station is unattended.

== Adjacent stations ==
«	Service	»
West Japan Railway Company
Wakayama Line
Kōyaguchi	Rapid Service	Myōji
Kōyaguchi	Local	Myōji

== History ==
Nakaiburi Station opened on May 1, 1957. With the privatization of the Japan National Railways (JNR) on April 1, 1987, the station came under the aegis of the West Japan Railway Company.

== Passenger statistics ==
In fiscal 2019, the station was used by an average of 344 passengers daily (boarding passengers only).

== Surrounding Area ==
- Kihoku Branch Hospital, Wakayama Medical University
- Faculty of Agriculture, Wakayama Prefectural Agricultural University
- Wakayama Prefectural Kihoku Agricultural High School
- Hatsusakura Sake Brewery

== See also ==
- List of railway stations in Japan
