= Niutsuhime Shrine =

Shinto shrine in Wakayama prefecture, Japan

Niutsuhime Jinja 丹生都比売神社
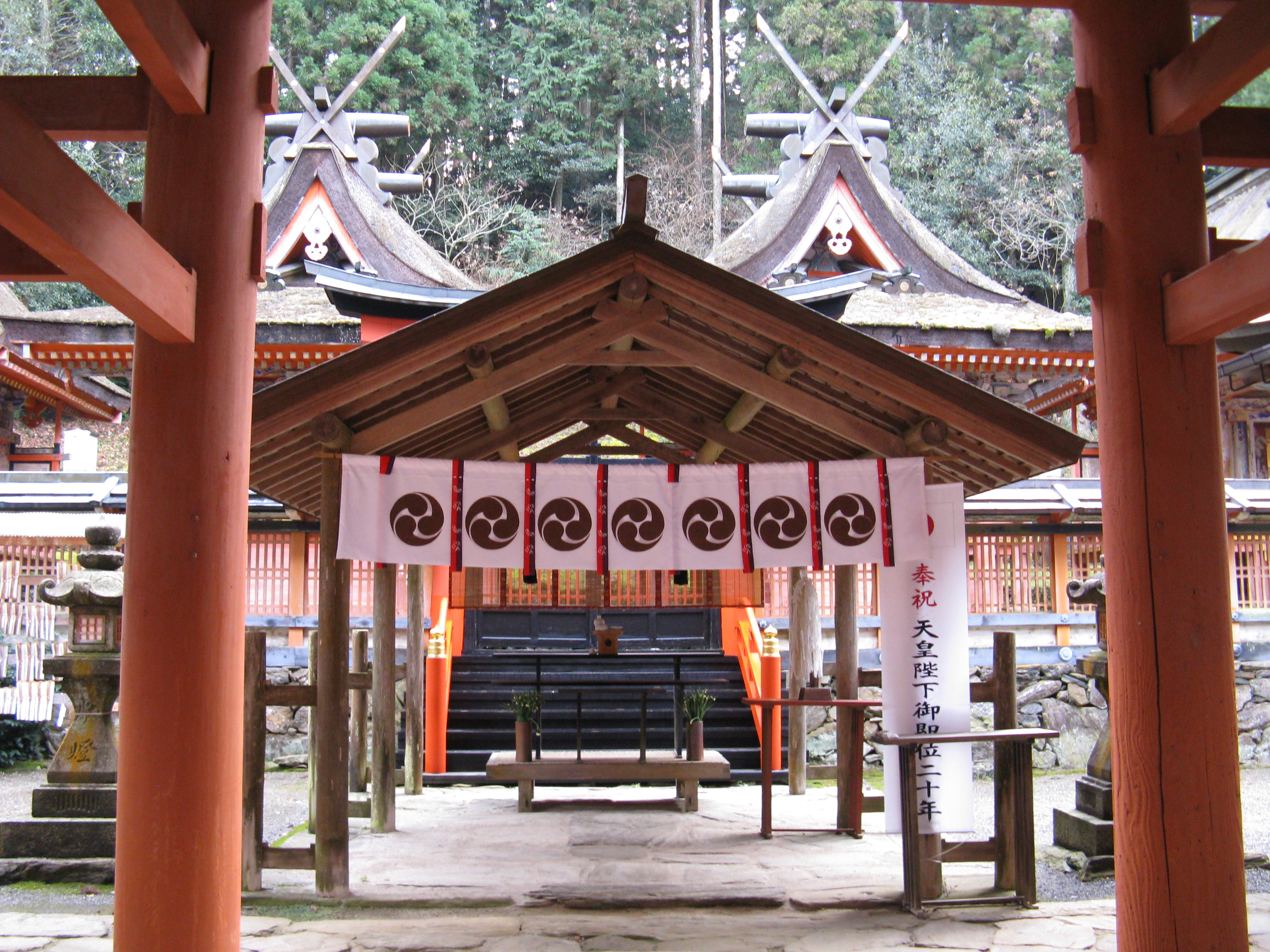
- Honden of Niutsuhime Jinja

- Niutsuhime Jinja Niutsuhime Shrine (Japan)

Religion
- Affiliation: Shinto
- Deity: Niutsuhime-no-Ōkami; Kōyamiko-no-Ōkami; Ōgetsuhime-no-kami; Ichikishimahime-no-Ōkami
- Festival: October 16

Location
- Location: 230 Kami-amano, Katsuragi-chō, Ito-gun, Wakayama-ken 649-7141
- Interactive map of Niutsuhime Jinja 丹生都比売神社
- Coordinates: 34°15′45.80″N 135°31′10.20″E

Architecture
- Style: kasuga-zukuri
- Established: Unknown, before 9th century
- UNESCO World Heritage Site
- Type: Cultural
- Criteria: ii, iv
- Designated: 2004
- Reference no.

Website
- Official website

The Niutsuhime Shrine or Nibutsuhime Shrine (丹生都比売神社, Niutsuhime-jinja, Nibutsuhime-jinja) is a Shinto shrine in located the town of Katsuragi, Ito district, Wakayama Prefecture, Japan. The shrine is one of three shrines claiming the title of ichinomiya of Kii Province. Also known as "Amano Taisha" and "Amano Shisho Myojin", it is the head shrine of about 180 Niutsuhime Shrines around the country. Its precincts are designated a National Historic Site and the shrine is one of the constituent assets of the UNESCO World Heritage Site Sacred Sites and Pilgrimage Routes in the Kii Mountain Range.

== Overview ==
The shrine is located in the Amano basin, northwest of Mount Koya in the northeastern part of Wakayama prefecture. The Kōyasan chōishi-michi, the path to Mount Koya lined with stone markers (itself a National Historic Site and World Heritage Site) passes on the ridge of the hill behind the shrine. The kasuga-zukuri style Honden and the Rōmon gate of the shrine are both National Important Cultural Properties.

There are four kami worshipped at Niutsuhime Shrine:

- Niutsuhime-no-Ōkami (丹生都比売大神), also known as Niutsu-myōjin (丹生明神)
- Takanomiko-no-Ōkami (高野御子大神), also known as Kariba-myōjin (狩場明神)
- Ōgetsuhime-no-Ōkami (大食津比売大神), also known as Kihi-myōjin (気比明神) (brought from Kehi Shrine in 1208
- Ichikishimahime-no-Ōkami (市杵島比売大神), brought from Itsukushima Shrine in 1208

== History ==
The foundation of Niutsuhime Shrine is uncertain. Per the "Harima Kokudo Fudoki", a kami named "Niutsuhime no Mikoto", and this has been equated with Niutsuhime Shrine. The "Harima Kokudo Fudoki" goes on to describe how Empress Jingu consulted the oracle of this shrine prior to her conquest of Korea, and the Nihon Shoki names the local Kuni no miyatsuko as "Amano-no-Hafuri" and states that he donated red clay (cinnabar) as a token of victory. The enshrined kami, Niutsuhime-no-Ōkami, is the younger sister of Amaterasu an is credited with land clearing in parts of Yamato province and the Kii Peninsula to bring agriculture to the land.

The location of the shrine was given as the eastern peak of Kamitsutsuga, near the water source of the Nyukawa River. This area is still regarded as the former enshrined place of Niutsuhime Shrine, which was relocated to its current site due to the construction of Kongōbu-ji in the early Heian period. In the Konjaku Monogatari, Takanomiko-no-Ōkami, the son of Niutsuhime-no-Ōkami assumed the form of a hunter with two black and white dogs, and led Kūkai into the mountains, where he later built Mount Koya on what was formerly the site of the shrine. The shrine was rebuilt a short distance away to be the guardian shrine of the temple. By the end of the 10th century, the shine was officially regarded as being a part of the temple. The shrine is mentioned in the 927 AD Engishiki records as receiving an annual stipend from the Court. Due to its strong connection with Mount Koya, branches of the shrine were established in many locations in conjunction with the spread of Shingon Buddhism. During the Kamakura period, the oracle of the shrine predicted the Mongol invasions of Japan, and the shrine took the lead in prayers for divine intervention which led to the Japanese victory. It came to be described in contemporary literature as the ichinomiya of Kii Province, although there are several other shrines within Kii Province with an older claim to that title. It was the custom for pilgrims to Mount Koya to pay a visit to this shrine before visiting the temple.

The shrine became independent of Mount Koya following the Meiji restoration, although many Buddhist relics remain within its precincts due to its long association with Mount Koya. The shrine was designated a prefectural shrine in 1873 under the Modern system of ranked Shinto shrines within State Shinto. It was promoted to an Imperial shrines, 1st rank (官幣大社, kanpei taisha) in 1924. It still retains close ties with Mount Koya, and monks reciting Buddhist sutras in front of the shrine is a common sight.

== Gallery ==
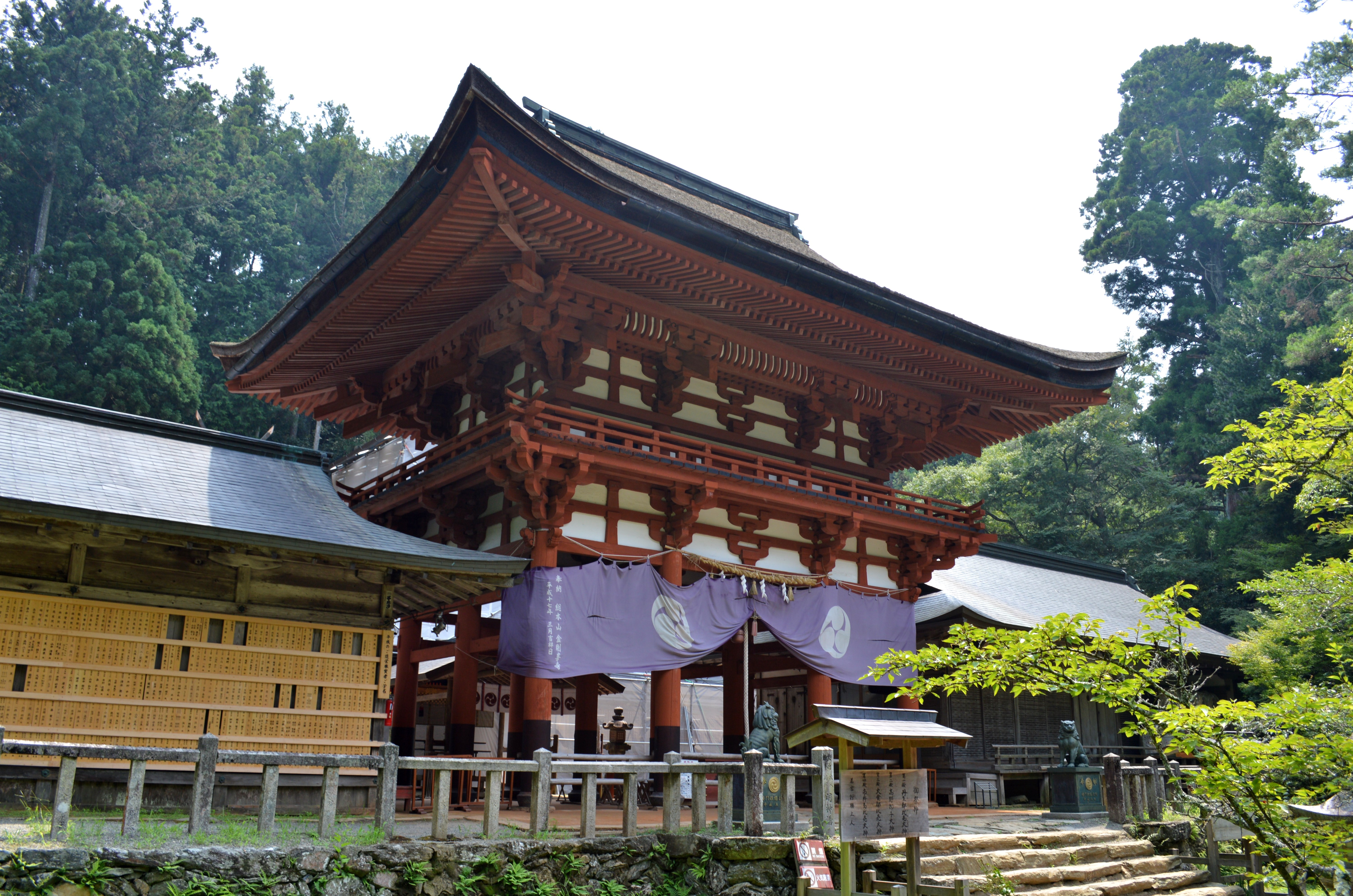
Rōmon, National ICP

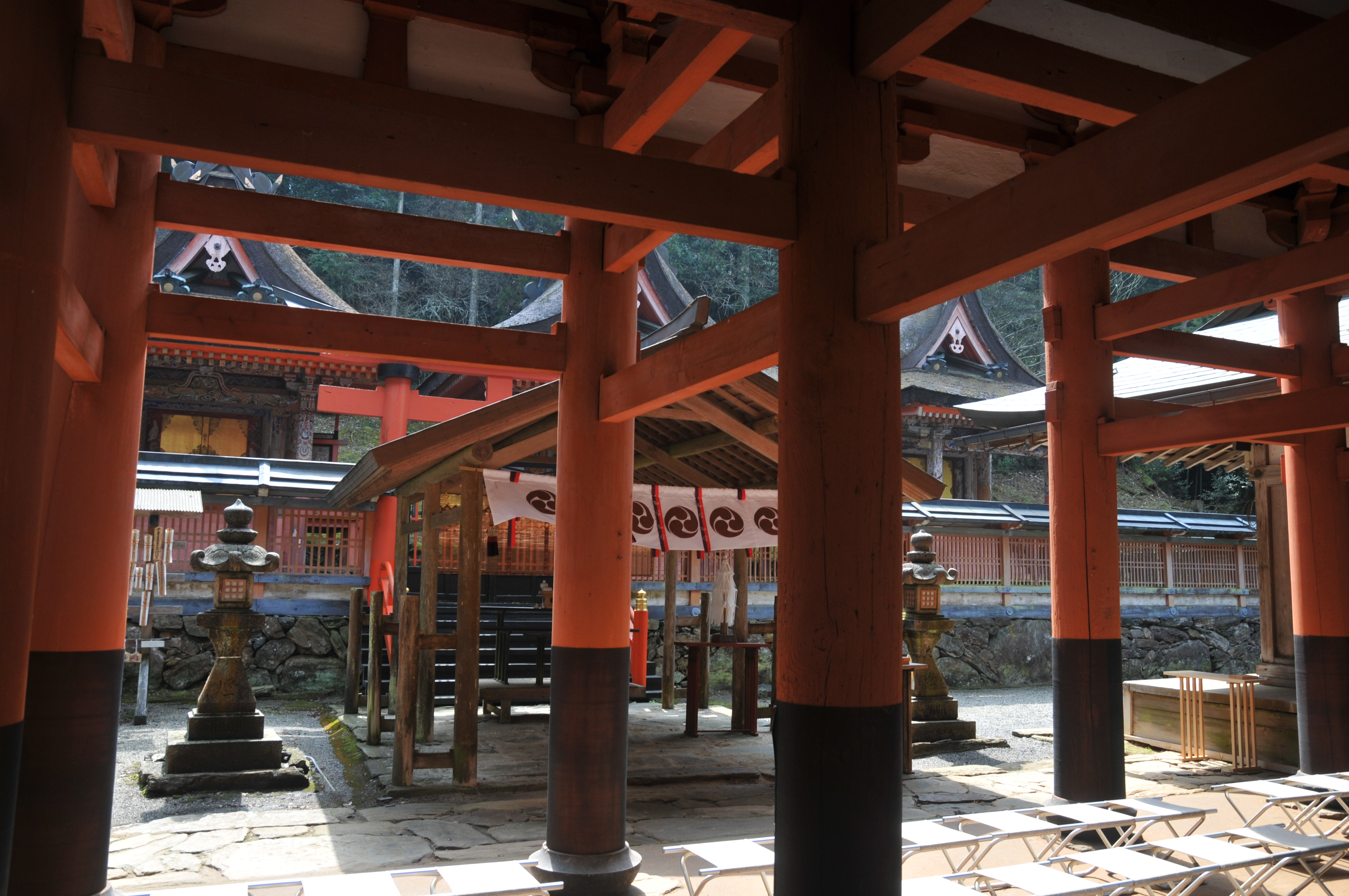
Honden, National ICP

== Cultural properties ==
=== National Treasures ===
- Silver and bronze Hirumaki Tachi sword mounting (銀銅蛭巻太刀拵), late Heian period; now kept at Tokyo National Museum.

=== National Important Cultural Properties ===
- Rōmon (楼門), mid-Muromachi period (1499)
- Honden (本殿), Muromachi - Edo period (1469–1486, 1715, 1901), 4 structures
- Wooden statues of Komainu (木造狛犬), Kamakura period; 1-pair
- Wooden statues of Komainu (木造狛犬), Kamakura period; 1-pair
- Gild-wood mikoshi shrine (木造鍍金装神輿), Muromachi period; 2 pcs
- Tachi sword, Hyogo Kusari Tachi (兵庫鎖太刀), Kamakura period; set of 2
- Tachi sword with gilt ring pommel (鍍金長覆輪太刀), Kamakura period;
- Tachi sword with gilt ring pommel (鍍金長覆輪太刀), Kamakura period; set of 2
- A letter of donation written by Emperor Gomurakami, (後村上天皇宸翰寄進状 一巻), Nanboku-cho period (1350)
- Lotus Sutra, Ink on Paper, (紙本墨書法華経), Heian to Nanboku-cho period; 8 volumes
- Gilt-bronze biwa (金銅琵琶), Kamakura period

=== Wakayama Prefecture Designated Tangible Cultural Properties ===
- Stone gorinto pagodas (石造五輪卒塔婆群), Kamakura to Muromachi period; set of four
- Gaku Taiko En (楽太鼓縁), Muromachi period; set of four
- Taiko Drum body (鼓胴), Muromachi period; set of three
- Zuikaran Hachiryo Mirror (瑞華鸞八稜鏡), Heian period;

== See also ==
- ichinomiya
- List of National Treasures of Japan (crafts-swords)
- List of Historic Sites of Japan (Wakayama)
