= Nate Station =

Railway station in Kinokawa, Wakayama Prefecture, Japan

Nate Station 名手駅
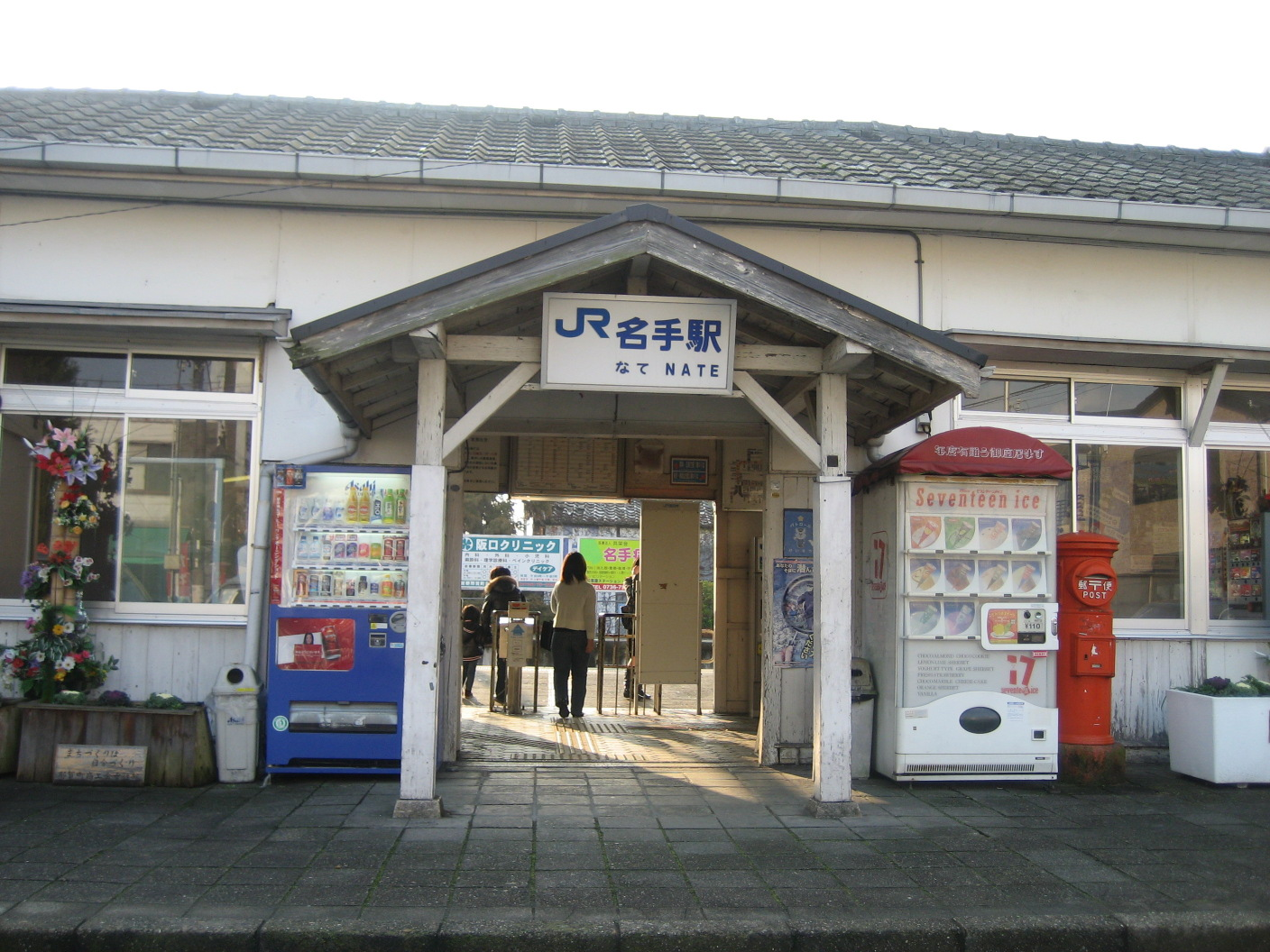
- Nate Station, January 2007

General information
- Location: 56-1 Nateichiba-chō, Kinokawa-shi, Wakayama-ken 649-6631; Japan
- Coordinates: 34.2727°N 135.4335°E
- Owner: West Japan Railway Company
- Operator: West Japan Railway Company
- Line: T Wakayama Line
- Distance: 63.2 km (39.3 miles) from Ōji
- Platforms: 2 side platforms
- Tracks: 2
- Train operators: West Japan Railway Company

Other information
- Status: Staffed
- Website: Official website

History
- Opened: 1 November 1901

Passengers
- FY2019: 438 daily
Services
Preceding station	JR-West	Following station
Wakayama Line
Nishi-Kaseda	Rapid Service	Kokawa
Nishi-Kaseda	Local	Kokawa
Location
- Location within Wakayama Prefecture Location within Japan

Nate Station (名手駅, Nate-eki) is a passenger railway station in located in the city of Kinokawa, Wakayama Prefecture, Japan, operated by West Japan Railway Company (JR West).

== Lines ==
Nate Station is served by the Wakayama Line, and is located 63.2 kilometers from the terminus of the line at Ōji Station.

== Station layout ==
The station consists of two opposed side platforms connected to the station building by a footbridge. The station is unattended.

=== Platforms ===
1	■ T Wakayama Line	for Hashimoto and Gojō
2	■ T Wakayama Line	for Kokawa and Wakayama

== Adjacent stations ==
«	Service	»
Wakayama Line
Nishi-Kaseda	Rapid Service	Kokawa
Nishi-Kaseda	Local	Kokawa

== History ==
Nate Station opened on October 1, 1901 on the Kiwa Railway after considerable dispute between local residents on its location. The line was sold to the Kansai Railway in 1904, which was subsequently nationalized in 1907. With the privatization of the Japan National Railways (JNR) on April 1, 1987, the station came under the aegis of the West Japan Railway Company.

== Passenger statistics ==
In fiscal 2019, the station was used by an average of 438 passengers daily (boarding passengers only).

== Surrounding Area ==
- Kinokawa City Hall Naka Branch (formerly Naka Town Hall)
- Hanaoka Seishu Memorial Park
- Former Nate-juku Honjin
- Iimoriyama Castle Ruins
- Kinokawa Municipal Master Elementary School

== See also ==
- List of railway stations in Japan
