= Kishigawa, Wakayama =

Dissolved municipality in Wakayama prefecture, Japan

Kishigawa (貴志川町, Kishigawa-chō) was a town located in Naga District, Wakayama Prefecture, Japan.

As of 2003, the town had an estimated population of 21,158 and a density of 940.77 persons per km^{2}. The total area was 22.49 km^{2}.

On November 11, 2005, Kishigawa, along with the towns of Kokawa, Momoyama, Naga and Uchita (all from Naga District), was merged to create the city of Kinokawa.
