= Uchita =

Dissolved municipality in Wakayama prefecture, Japan

Uchita (打田町, Uchita-chō) was a town located in Naga District, Wakayama Prefecture, Japan.

As of 2003 town had an estimated population of 15,111 and a density of 311.89 persons per km^{2}. The total area was 48.45 km^{2}.

On November 11, 2005, Uchita, along with the towns of Kishigawa, Kokawa, Momoyama and Naga (all from Naga District), was merged to create the city of Kinokawa.
