= Momoyama, Wakayama =

Dissolved municipality in Wakayama prefecture, Japan

Momoyama (桃山町, Momoyama-chō) was a town located in Naga District, Wakayama Prefecture, Japan.

As of 2003, the town had an estimated population of 8,090 and a density of 156.33 persons per km^{2}. The total area was 51.75 km^{2}.

On November 11, 2005, Momoyama, along with the towns of Kishigawa, Kokawa, Naga and Uchita (all from Naga District), was merged to create the city of Kinokawa.
