= Naga, Wakayama =

Naga 那賀町
- City
- Interactive map of Naga
- Country: Japan
- Prefecture: Wakayama
- District: Naga
- Merged: November 11, 2005 (now part of Kinokawa)

Area
  - Total: 28.12 km^{2} (10.86 sq mi)

Population (2003)
  - Total: 8,814
  - Density: 313.44/km^{2} (811.8/sq mi)
- Time zone: UTC+09:00 (JST)
- Website: Official town website (in Japanese) (website doesn't work)

Naga (那賀町, Naga-chō) was a town located in Naga District, Wakayama Prefecture, Japan.

As of 2003, the town had an estimated population of 8,814 and a density of 313.44 persons per km^{2}. The total area was 28.12 km^{2}.

On November 11, 2005, Naga, along with the towns of Kishigawa, Kokawa, Momoyama and Uchita (all from Naga District), was merged to create the city of Kinokawa.
