= Former Nate-juku Honjin =

- 旧名手宿本陣
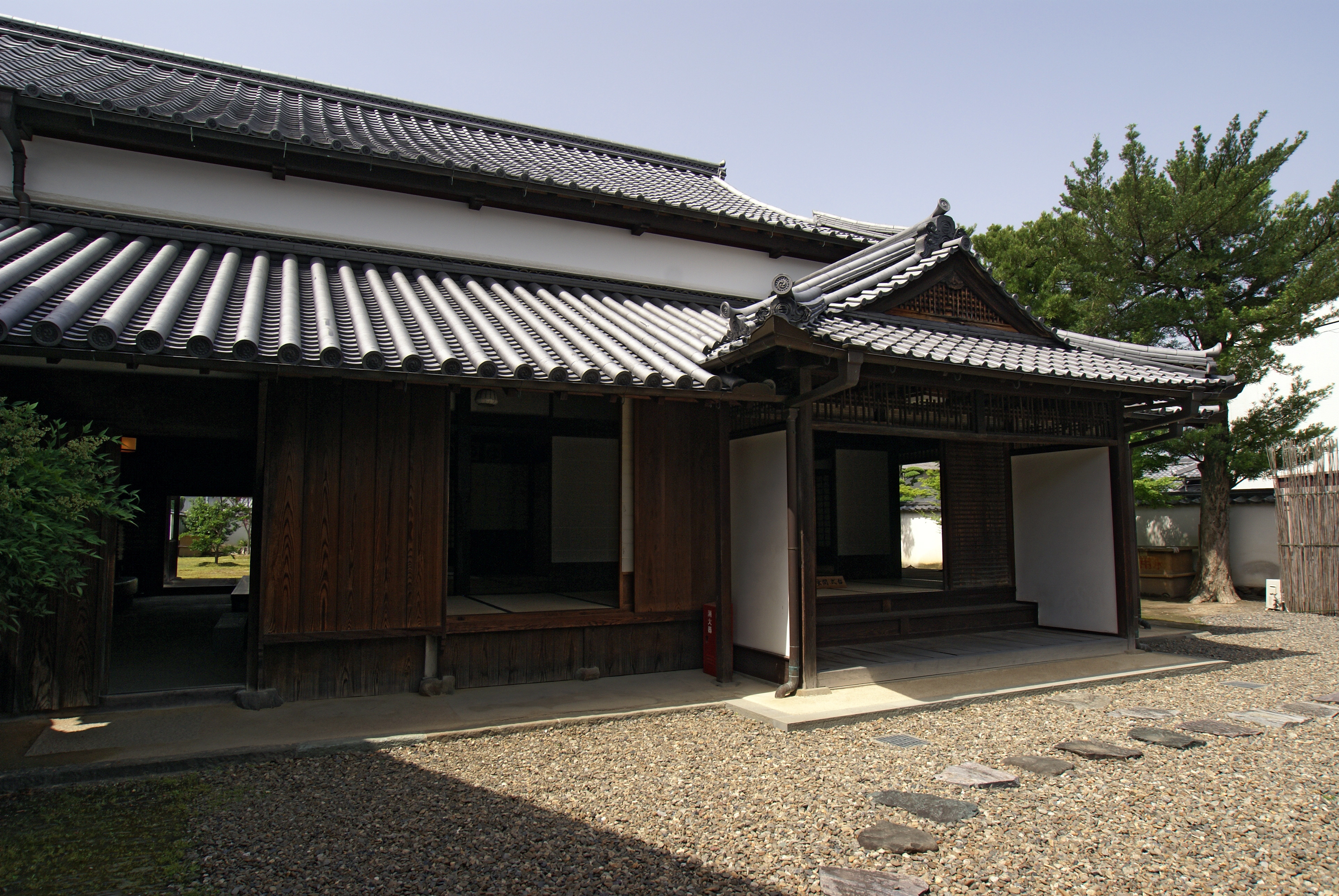
- The Former Nate-juku Honjin is an Important Cultural Property

- Location within Wakayama Prefecture Location within Japan

General information
- Location: Kinokawa, Wakayama Prefecture, Japan
- Coordinates: 34°16′32.8″N 135°26′9.0″E
- Opened: 1714
- National Historic Site of Japan Important Cultural Property

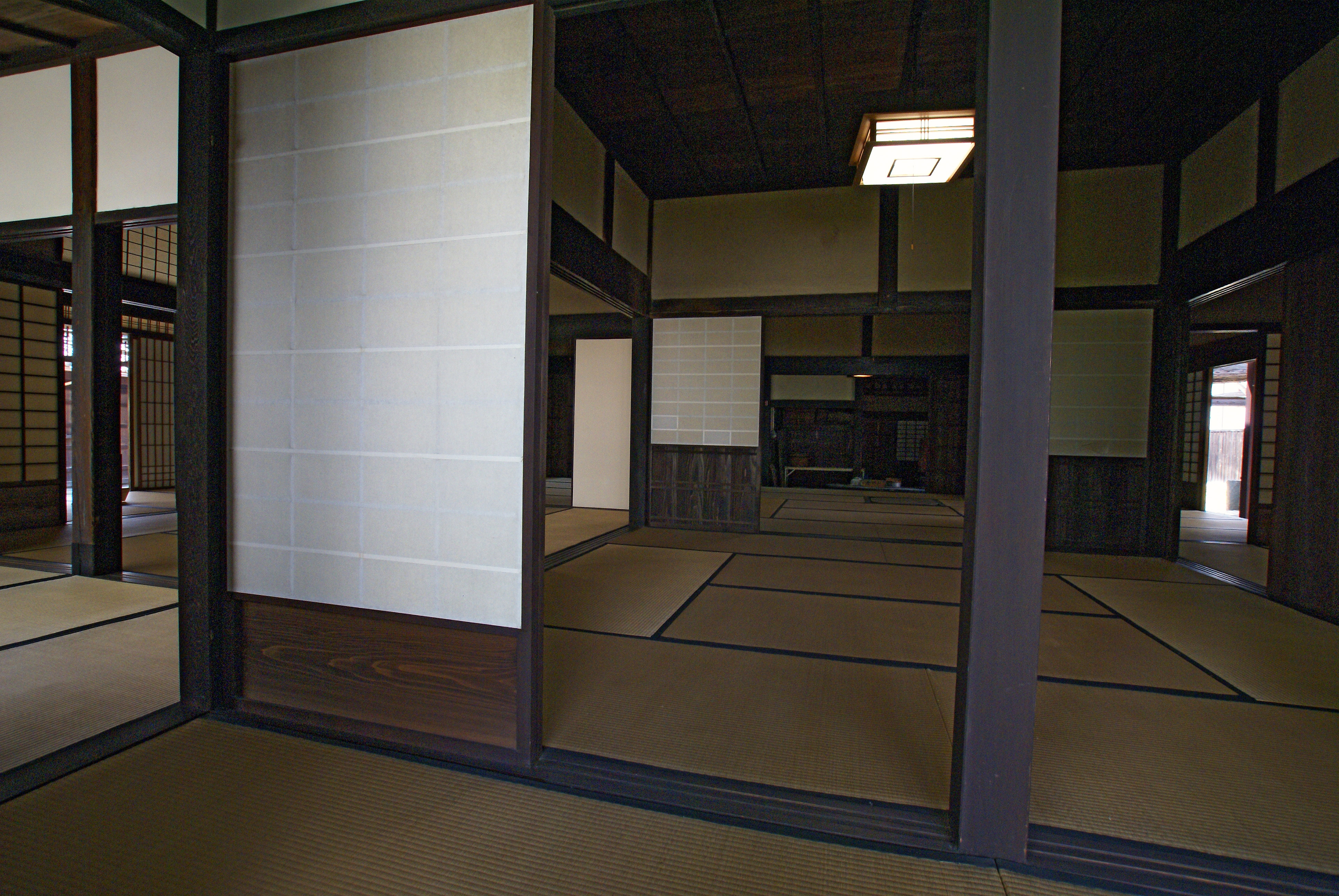
Interior

The Former Nate-juku Honjin (旧名手宿本陣, Kyū-Nate-juku honjin) is a surviving Edo Period honjin complex located in the city of Kinokawa, Wakayama Prefecture in the Kansai region of Japan. Three of the buildings of the complex (the main building and two warehouses) have been designated National Important Cultural Properties and the entire complex was designated a National Historic Site in 1970.

== Overview ==
A Honjin (本陣) was an inn for government officials, generally located in post stations on highways in Edo Period Japan. Many of the honjin were actually personal residences of village and town leaders. As such, they received official designations from the government and expanded their residences to include walls, gates and other features. Because of their cooperation, the owners of the honjin also gained various special rights. General travelers, regardless of status or money, were not able to stay at honjin, which were reserved typically for daimyō on sankin kōtai to-and-from the Shogun's court in Edo, and hatamoto on official business. In the case of the Nate-juku Honjin, this was a structure located on the Yamato Kaidō, a secondary highway which connected Kii Province with Yamato Province and Kyoto. The route was used by the daimyō of Kishū Domain. The Imose family of local samurai were appointed headmen and magistrates over the post station in 1630 and constructed the honjin. The building was also the home of the wife of the doctor Hanaoka Seishū, whose biography was popularized in a novel (The Doctor's Wife) by Sawako Ariyoshi in 1966.

The original structure burned down and was rebuilt in 1714 and consisted of a walled complex, 40 meters east-to-west by 80 meters north-to-south. The complex contained a large gate, main building and two kura storehouses, and two government offices separated from the residential section by a wall. The warehouses had tags with the dates of the Kan'ei era (1624–1644) and are thus believed to be survivors of the 1714 fire.

The honjin is about a five-minute walk from Nate Station on the JR West Wakayama Line and is open to the public as a museum.

== See also ==
- List of Historic Sites of Japan (Wakayama)
