= Myōji Station =

Railway station in Katsuragi, Wakayama Prefecture, Japan

Myōji Station 妙寺駅
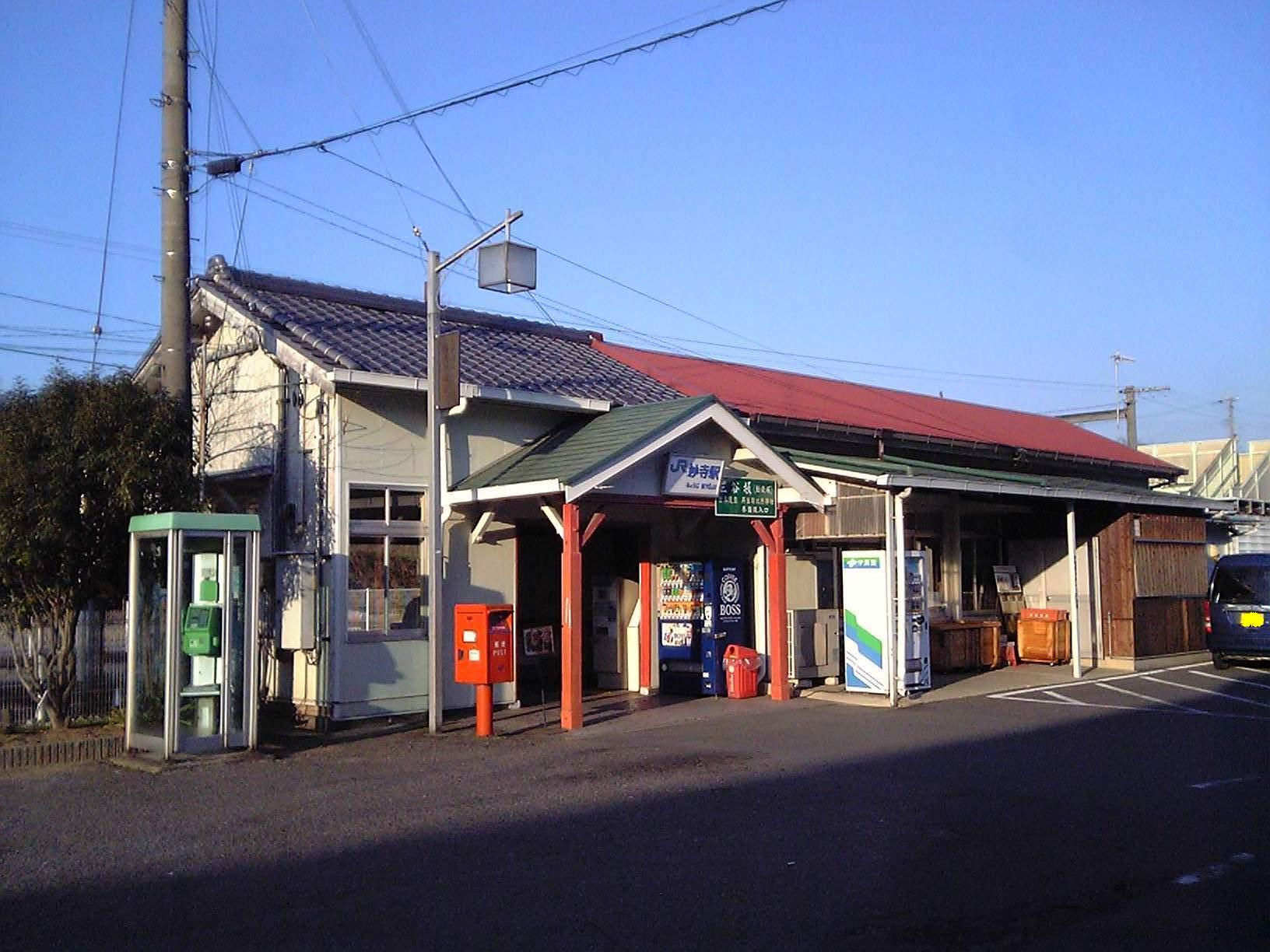
- Myōji Station, February 2010

General information
- Location: 2227-4 Chonomachi, Katsuragi-cho, Ito-gun, Wakayama-ken 649-7121; Japan
- Coordinates: 34.2984°N 135.5175°E
- System: JR-West commuter rail station
- Owner: West Japan Railway Company
- Operator: West Japan Railway Company
- Line: T Wakayama Line
- Distance: 54.6 km (33.9 miles) from Ōji
- Platforms: 2 side platforms
- Tracks: 2
- Train operators: West Japan Railway Company

Other information
- Status: Unstaffed
- Website: Official website

History
- Opened: 25 November 1900

Passengers
- FY2019: 266 daily
Services
| Preceding station | JR-West | Following station |
Wakayama Line
| Nakaiburi | Rapid Service | Ōtani |
| Nakaiburi | Local | Ōtani |
Location
- Location within Wakayama Prefecture Location within Japan

Myōji Station (妙寺駅, Myōji-eki) is a passenger railway station in located in the town of Katsuragi, Wakayama Prefecture, Japan, operated by West Japan Railway Company (JR West).

== Lines ==
Myōji Station is served by the Wakayama Line, and is located 54.6 kilometers from the terminus of the line at Ōji Station.

== Station layout ==
The station consists of two side platforms connected by a level crossing. The station originally had a side and an island platform, but one side of the island platform is no longer used, and the track has been removed. The station is unattended.

=== Platforms ===
| 1 | ■ T Wakayama Line | for Kokawa and Wakayama |
| 2 | ■ T Wakayama Line | for Hashimoto and Gojō |

== Adjacent stations ==
| « | Service | » |
West Japan Railway Company
Wakayama Line
| Nakaiburi | Rapid Service | Ōtani |
| Nakaiburi | Local | Ōtani |

== History ==
Myōji Station opened on November 25, 1900. With the privatization of the Japan National Railways (JNR) on April 1, 1987, the station came under the aegis of the West Japan Railway Company.

== Passenger statistics ==
In fiscal 2019, the station was used by an average of 266 passengers daily (boarding passengers only).

== Surrounding Area ==
- Katsuragi Municipal Myoji Junior High School
- Katsuragi Park

== See also ==
- List of railway stations in Japan
