= Ōtani Station =

Ōtani Station (大谷駅, Ōtani-eki) is the name of two train stations in Japan:

- Ōtani Station (Shiga)
- Ōtani Station (Wakayama)
