= Kinokawa =

Kinokawa 紀の川市
- City
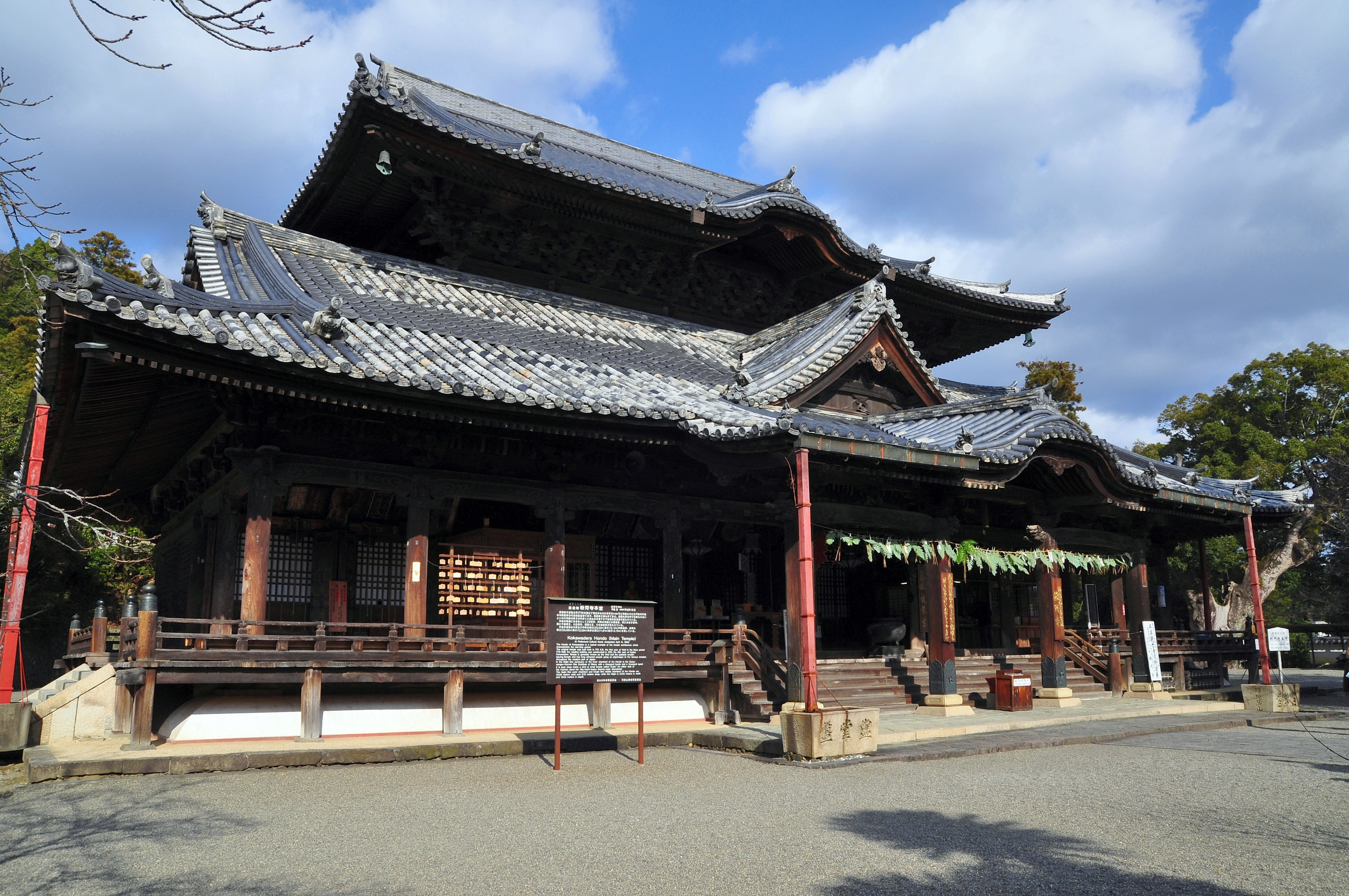
- Kokawa Temple, a sightseeing spot in Kinokawa

- Flag

- Location of Kinokawa in Wakayama Prefecture

- Location in Japan
- Coordinates: 34°15′59″N 135°21′55″E
- Country: Japan
- Region: Kansai
- Prefecture: Wakayama

Government
  - Mayor: Shinji Nakamura (since November 2005)

Area
  - Total: 228.21 km^{2} (88.11 sq mi)

Population (November 30, 2021)
  - Total: 60,592
  - Density: 265.51/km^{2} (687.67/sq mi)
- Time zone: UTC+09:00 (JST)
- City hall address: Nishi-Oi 338, Kinokawa-shi, Wakayama-ken 649-6492
- Website: Official website
- Symbols
- Bird: Cettia diphone
- Flower: Peach
- Tree: Osmanthus

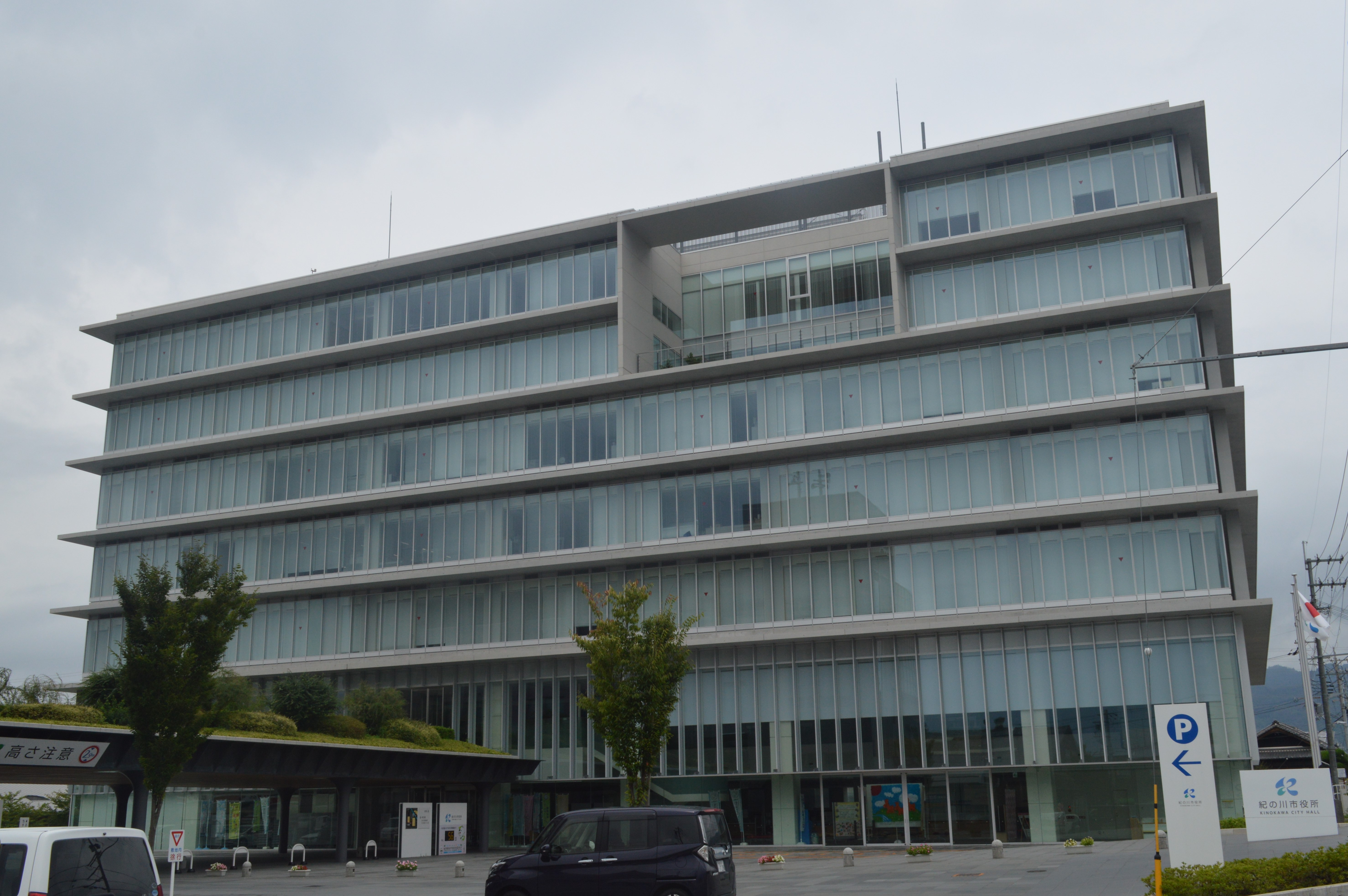
Kinokawa City Hall

Kinokawa (紀の川市, Kinokawa-shi) is a city in Wakayama Prefecture, Japan. As of 30 November 2021, the city had an estimated population of 60,592 in 26,652 households and a population density of 270 persons per km^{2}. The total area of the city is 228.21 square kilometres (88.11 sq mi).

== Geography ==
Kinokawa is located on the northern border of Wakayama Prefecture with Osaka Prefecture and the Izumi Mountains to the north and the Kii Mountains to the south. The Kinokawa River, after which the city is named, runs through the city from east to west.

=== Neighboring municipalities ===
Osaka Prefecture

- Izumisano
- Kaizuka
- Kishiwada
- Sennan

Wakayama Prefecture

- Iwade
- Kainan
- Katsuragi
- Kimino
- Wakayama (city)

== Climate ==
Kinokawa has a Humid subtropical climate (Köppen Cfa) characterized by warm summers and cool winters with light to no snowfall. The average annual temperature in Kinokawa is 14.4 °C. The average annual rainfall is 1713 mm with September as the wettest month. The temperatures are highest on average in August, at around 26.0 °C, and lowest in January, at around 3.2 °C.

== Demographics ==
Per Japanese census data, the population of Kinokawa has remained relatively steady over the past 60 years.

Historical population
Year	Pop.	±%
1960	62,926	—
1970	61,317	−2.6%
1980	62,218	+1.5%
1990	65,126	+4.7%
2000	70,067	+7.6%
2010	64,845	−7.5%

== History ==
The area of the modern city of Kinokawa was within ancient Kii Province. After the Meiji restoration, the area became organized into 36 villages within Naga District, Wakayama with the creation of the modern municipalities system on April 1, 1889. Kokawa was raised to town status on November 10, 1894, and Kishigawa on March 31, 1955 and Naga on July 1, 1955. The towns of Momoyama, and Uchita were established in 1956.

The modern city of Kinokawa was established on November 11, 2005, from the merger of the five towns of Kokawa, Kishigawa, Naga, Momoyama and Uchita.

== Government ==
Kinokawa has a mayor-council form of government with a directly elected mayor and a unicameral city council of 22 members. Kinokawa contributes three members to the Wakayama Prefectural Assembly. In terms of national politics, the city is part of Wakayama 1st district of the lower house of the Diet of Japan, along with Wakayama proper and Iwade.

== Economy ==
Kinokawa has a mixed economy. Agriculture, particularly horticulture remains a very strong component and is the major employer. Light and medium industries, particularly electronics and IT-related industries, have been attracted to the area due to its proximity to the Hanshin urban area.

== Education ==
Kinokawa has 16 public elementary schools and seven public middle schools operated by the city government and two public high schools operated by the Wakayama Prefectural Department of Education. Kinki University's Biology-Oriented Science and Technology Institute is located in Kinokawa.

== Transportation ==
=== Railway ===
JR West – Wakayama Line

- Nate - Kokawa - Kii-Nagata - Uchita - Shimoisaka

Wakayama Electric Railway – Kishigawa Line

- Oikeyūen - Nishiyamaguchi - Kanrojimae - Kishi

=== Highway ===
- Keinawa Expressway
- National Route 24
- National Route 424
- National Route 480

== Local attractions ==
- Former Nate-juku Honjin, National Historic Site
- Kii Kokubun-ji ruins, National Historic Site
- Kishi Station and station mascot Tama a calico cat.
- Kokawa-dera, No.3 of the Saigoku Kannon Pilgrimage

== Notable people from Kinokawa ==
- Naoya Masuda, baseball pitcher
- Hanaoka Seishū, surgeon of the Edo period
- Midori Shintani, judo wrestler
- Ryumon Yasuda, painter and sculptor
