= Kii-Yamada Station =

Railway station in Hashimoto, Wakayama Prefecture, Japan

Kii-Yamada Station 紀伊山田駅
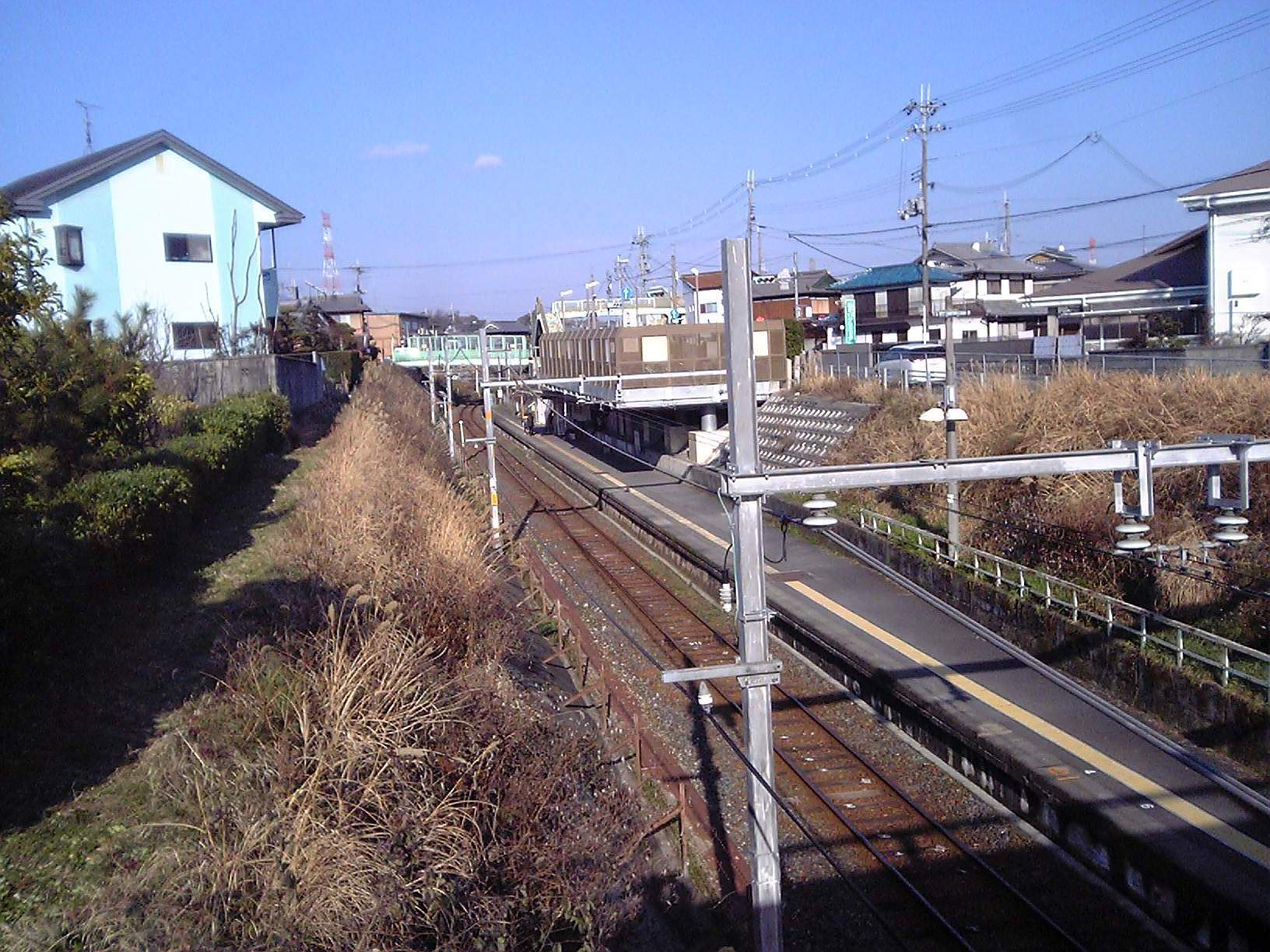
- Kii-Yamada Station, February 2010

General information
- Location: 378 Konono, Hashimoto-shi, Wakayama-ken 648-0086; Japan
- Coordinates: 34.3129°N 135.5838°E
- System: JR-West commuter rail station
- Owner: West Japan Railway Company
- Operator: West Japan Railway Company
- Line: T Wakayama Line
- Distance: 48.0 km (29.8 miles) from Ōji
- Platforms: 1 side platform
- Tracks: 1
- Train operators: West Japan Railway Company

Other information
- Status: Staffed
- Website: Official website

History
- Opened: 1 October 1952

Passengers
- FY2019: 595 daily
Services
Preceding station	JR-West	Following station
Wakayama Line
Hashimoto	Rapid Service	Kōyaguchi
Hashimoto	Local	Kōyaguchi
Location
- Location within Wakayama Prefecture Location within Japan

Kii-Yamada Station (紀伊山田駅, Kii-Yamada-eki) is a passenger railway station in located in the city of Hashimoto, Wakayama Prefecture, Japan, operated by West Japan Railway Company (JR West).

== Lines ==
Kii-Yamada Station is served by the Wakayama Line, and is located 48.0 kilometers from the terminus of the line at Ōji Station.

== Station layout ==
The station consists of one side platform serving a single bi-directional track. There is no station building, but the platform and track are located a cutting, with the floor of the station parking lot extending over a portion of the platform to form a weather shelter. The station is unattended.

== Adjacent stations ==
«	Service	»
West Japan Railway Company
Wakayama Line
Hashimoto	Rapid Service	Kōyaguchi
Hashimoto	Local	Kōyaguchi

== History ==
Kii-Yamada Station opened on October 1, 1952. With the privatization of the Japan National Railways (JNR) on April 1, 1987, the station came under the aegis of the West Japan Railway Company.

== Passenger statistics ==
In fiscal 2019, the station was used by an average of 595 passengers daily (boarding passengers only).

== Surrounding Area ==
- Shokoji Temple
- Hikarisanbo-arashin Shrine
- Wakayama Prefectural Kihoku Technical High School

== See also ==
- List of railway stations in Japan
