= Kaseda Station =

Railway station in Katsuragi, Wakayama Prefecture, Japan

Kaseda Station 笠田駅
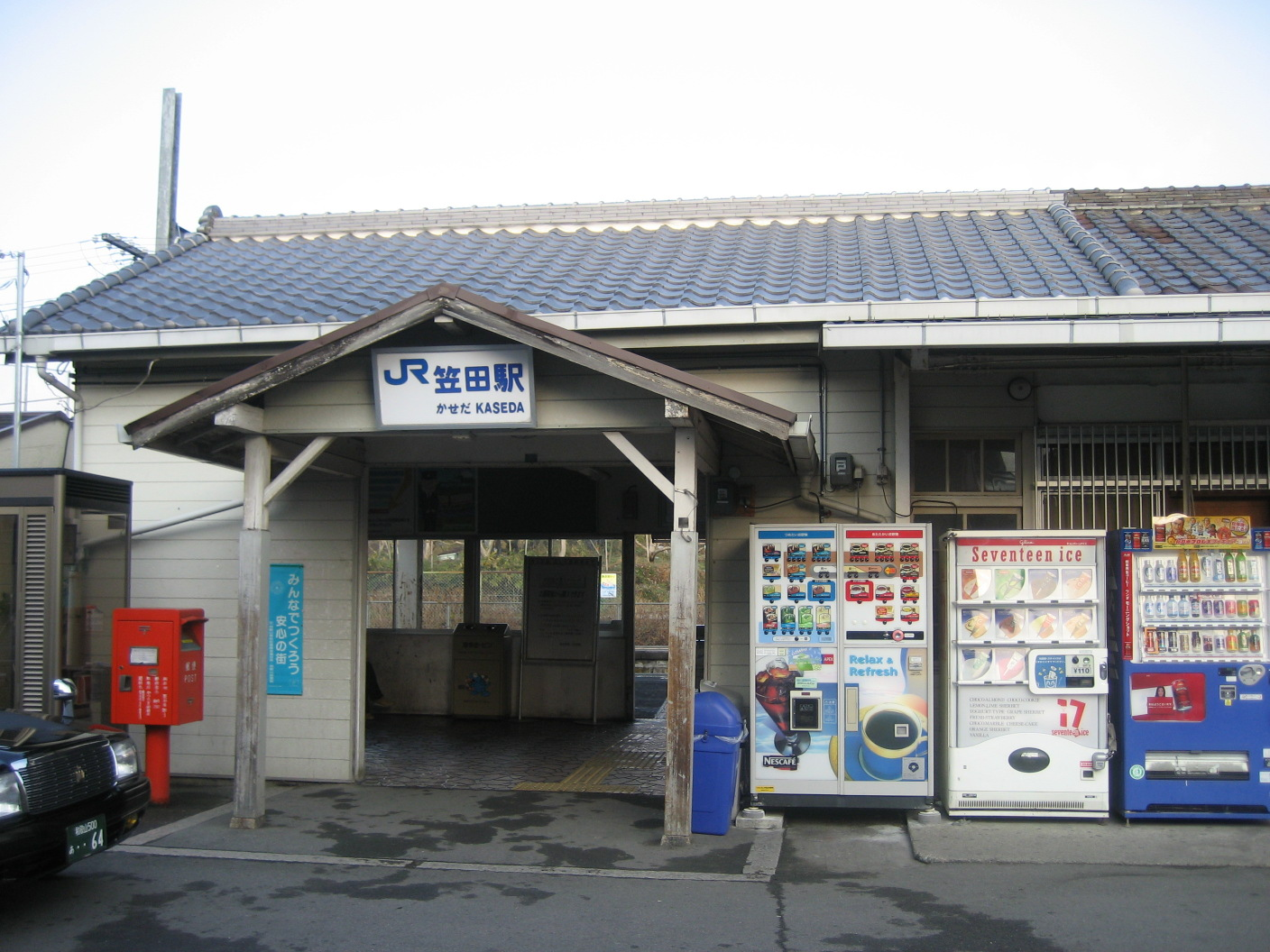
- Kaseda Station, January 2007

General information
- Location: 19-1 Kasedahigashi, Katsuragi-cho, Ito-gun, Wakayama-ken 649-7161; Japan
- Coordinates: 34.2920°N 135.4800°E
- System: JR-West commuter rail station
- Owner: West Japan Railway Company
- Operator: West Japan Railway Company
- Line: T Wakayama Line
- Distance: 58.2 km (36.2 miles) from Ōji
- Platforms: 2 side platforms
- Tracks: 2
- Train operators: West Japan Railway Company

Other information
- Status: Staffed
- Website: Official website

History
- Opened: 25 November 1900

Passengers
- FY2019: 736 daily
Services
Preceding station	JR-West	Following station
Wakayama Line
Ōtani	Rapid Service	Nishi-Kaseda
Ōtani	Local	Nishi-Kaseda
Location
- Location within Wakayama Prefecture Location within Japan

Kaseda Station (笠田駅, Kaseda-eki) is a passenger railway station in located in the town of Katsuragi, Wakayama Prefecture, Japan, operated by West Japan Railway Company (JR West).

== Lines ==
Kaseda Station is served by the Wakayama Line, and is located 58.2 kilometers from the terminus of the line at Ōji Station.

== Station layout ==
The station consists of two side platforms connected to the station building by a footbridge. The station is staffed.

=== Platforms ===
1	■ T Wakayama Line	for Kokawa and Wakayama
2	■ T Wakayama Line	for Hashimoto and Gojō

== Adjacent stations ==
«	Service	»
West Japan Railway Company
Wakayama Line
Ōtani	Rapid Service	Nishi-Kaseda
Ōtani	Local	Nishi-Kaseda

== History ==
Kaseda Station opened on November 25, 1900. With the privatization of the Japan National Railways (JNR) on April 1, 1987, the station came under the aegis of the West Japan Railway Company.

== Passenger statistics ==
In fiscal 2019, the station was used by an average of 736 passengers daily (boarding passengers only).

== Surrounding Area ==
- Katsuragi Town Tourist Information Center (adjacent to the station building)
- Wakayama Prefectural Kasada High School
- Katsuragi Municipal Kasedahigashi Junior High School
- Katsuragi Municipal Kasedahigashi Elementary School

== See also ==
- List of railway stations in Japan
