= Kōyaguchi Station =

Railway station in Hashimoto, Wakayama Prefecture, Japan

Kōyaguchi Station 高野口駅
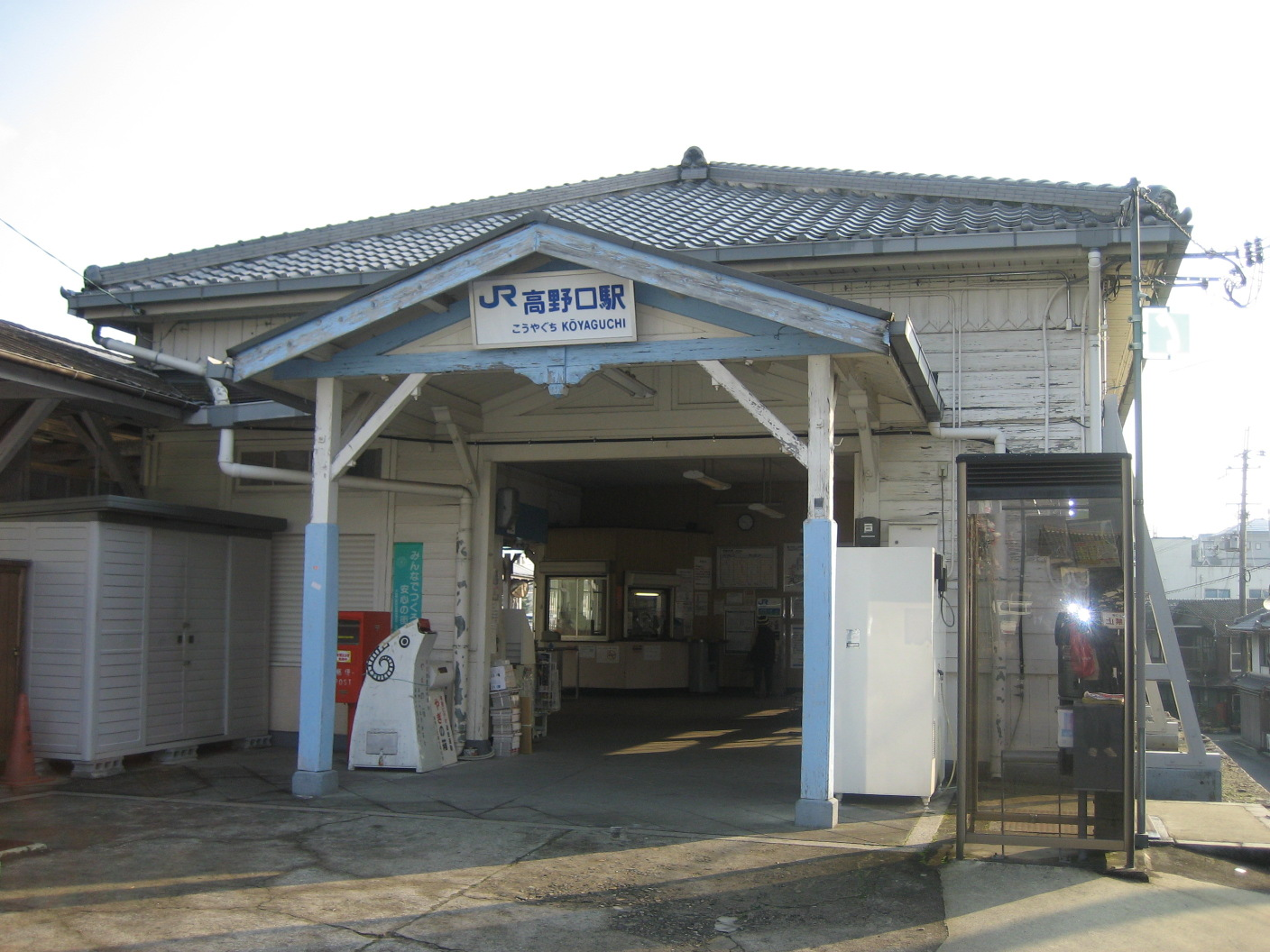
- Kōyaguchi Station, January 2007

General information
- Location: 790-2 Koyaguchicho Nagura, Hashimoto-shi, Wakayama-ken 649-7205; Japan
- Coordinates: 34°18′27.1″N 135°33′26″E
- System: JR-West commuter rail station
- Owner: West Japan Railway Company
- Operator: West Japan Railway Company
- Line: T Wakayama Line
- Distance: 50.6 km (31.4 miles) from Ōji
- Platforms: 2 side platforms
- Tracks: 2
- Train operators: West Japan Railway Company

Other information
- Status: Staffed
- Website: Official website

History
- Opened: 29 March 1901

Passengers
- FY2019: 582 daily
Services
Preceding station	JR-West	Following station
Wakayama Line
Kii-Yamada	Rapid Service	Nakaiburi
Kii-Yamada	Local	Nakaiburi
Location
- Location within Wakayama Prefecture Location within Japan

Kōyaguchi Station (高野口駅, Kōyaguchi-eki) is a passenger railway station in located in the city of Hashimoto, Wakayama Prefecture, Japan, operated by West Japan Railway Company (JR West).

== Lines ==
Kōyaguchi Station is served by the Wakayama Line, and is located 50.6 kilometers from the terminus of the line at Ōji Station.

== Station layout ==
The station consists of two opposed side platforms connected by a footbridge. The station is staffed.

=== Platforms ===
1	■ T Wakayama Line	for Kokawa and Wakayama
2	■ T Wakayama Line	for Hashimoto and Gojō

== Adjacent stations ==
«	Service	»
West Japan Railway Company
Wakayama Line
Kii-Yamada	Rapid Service	Nakaiburi
Kii-Yamada	Local	Nakaiburi

== History ==
Kōyaguchi Station opened on March 29, 1901 as Nakura Station (名倉駅) on the Kiwa Railway. It was renamed to its present name on January 1, 1903. The line was sold to the Kansai Railway in 1904, which was subsequently nationalized in 1907. With the privatization of the Japan National Railways (JNR) on April 1, 1987, the station came under the aegis of the West Japan Railway Company.

== Passenger statistics ==
In fiscal 2019, the station was used by an average of 582 passengers daily (boarding passengers only).

== Surrounding Area ==
- Koyaguchi Park
- Wakayama Prefectural Ito Chuo High School

== See also ==
- List of railway stations in Japan
