= Nishi-Kaseda Station =

Railway station in Katsuragi, Wakayama Prefecture, Japan

Nishi-Kaseda Station 西笠田駅
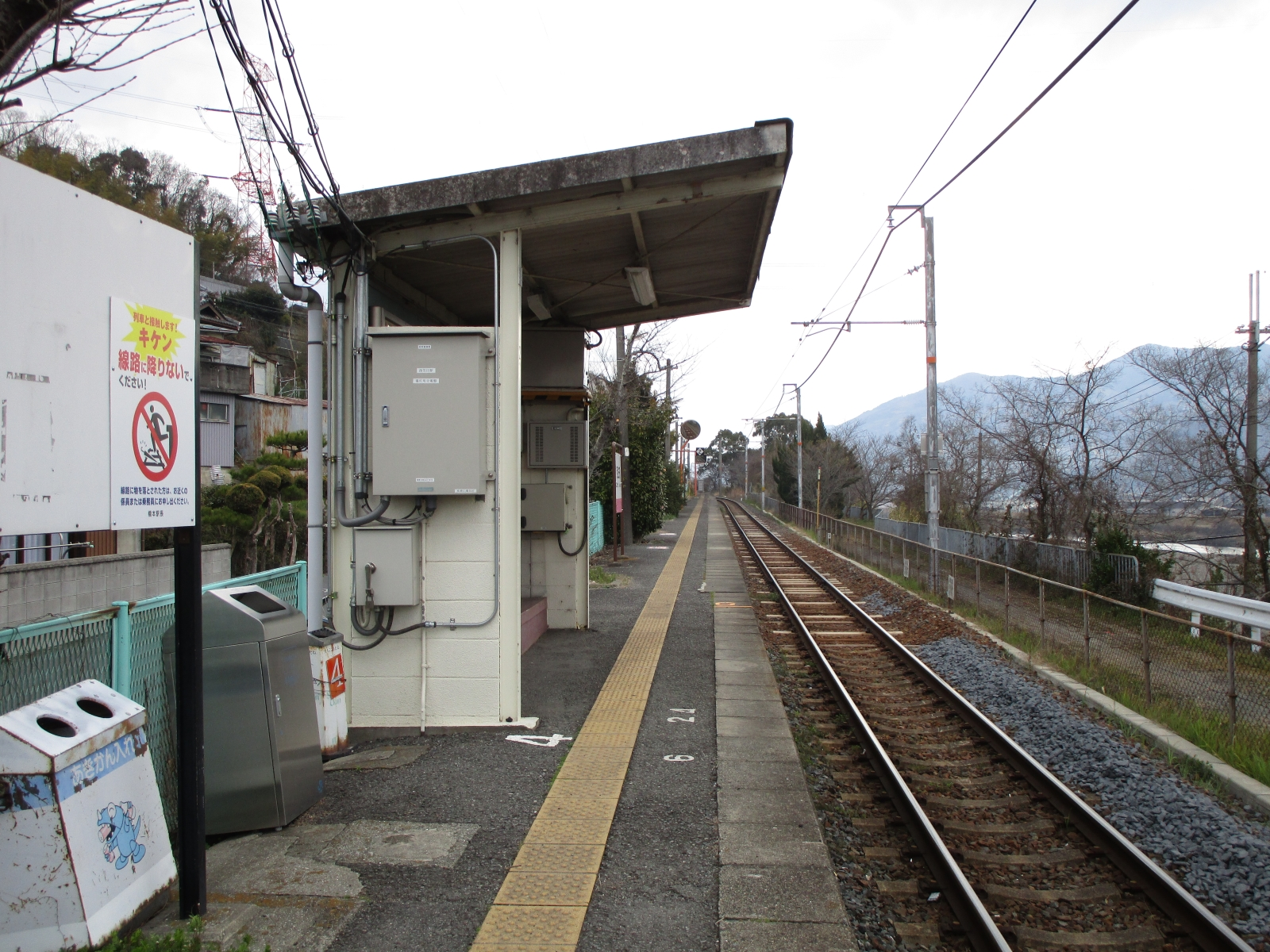
- Nishi-Kaseda Station, March 2017

General information
- Location: 121-5-4 Takada, Katsuragi-cho, Ito-gun, Wakayama-ken 649-7166; Japan
- Coordinates: 34.2800°N 135.4524°E
- System: JR-West commuter rail station
- Owner: West Japan Railway Company
- Operator: West Japan Railway Company
- Line: T Wakayama Line
- Distance: 61.3 km (38.1 miles) from Ōji
- Platforms: 1 side platform
- Tracks: 1
- Train operators: West Japan Railway Company

Other information
- Status: Unstaffed
- Website: Official website

History
- Opened: 1 November 1952

Passengers
- FY2019: 50 daily
Services
Preceding station	JR-West	Following station
Wakayama Line
Kaseda	Rapid Service	Nate
Kaseda	Local	Nate
Location
- Location within Wakayama Prefecture Location within Japan

Nishi-Kaseda Station (西笠田駅, Nishi-Kaseda-eki) is a passenger railway station in located in the town of Katsuragi, Wakayama Prefecture, Japan, operated by West Japan Railway Company (JR West).

== Lines ==
Nishi-Kaseda Station is served by the Wakayama Line, and is located 61.3 kilometers from the terminus of the line at Ōji Station.

== Station layout ==
The station consists of a single side platform serving one bi-directional track. There is no station building and the station is unattended.

== Adjacent stations ==
«	Service	»
West Japan Railway Company
Wakayama Line
Kaseda	Rapid Service	Nate
Kaseda	Local	Nate

== History ==
Nishi-Kaseda Station opened on November 1, 1952. With the privatization of the Japan National Railways (JNR) on April 1, 1987, the station came under the aegis of the West Japan Railway Company.

== Passenger statistics ==
In fiscal 2019, the station was used by an average of 50 passengers daily (boarding passengers only).

== Surrounding Area ==
- Kinokawa River

== See also ==
- List of railway stations in Japan
