= Daegok station =

Daegok station (Korean: 대곡역) may refer to the following railroad stations in South Korea.

- Daegok station (Goyang)
- Daegok station (Daegu Metro)
