= Naga District, Wakayama =

Former district in Wakayama prefecture, Japan

Naga (那賀郡, Naga-gun) was a district located in Wakayama, Japan.

There was only one town left within the district before the dissolution:

- Iwade

== History ==
- On November 11, 2005 - the towns of Kishigawa, Kokawa, Momoyama, Naga and Uchita were merged to create the city of Kinokawa.
- On April 1, 2006 - the town of Iwade was elevated to city status. Therefore, Naga District was dissolved as a result of this merger.
