= Kokawa, Wakayama =

Dissolved municipality in Wakayama prefecture, Japan

Kokawa (粉河町, Kokawa-chō) was a town located in Naga District, Wakayama Prefecture, Japan.

As of 2003, the town had an estimated population of 16,344 and a density of 210.27 persons per km^{2}. The total area was 77.73 km^{2}.

On November 11, 2005, Kokawa, along with the towns of Kishigawa, Momoyama, Naga and Uchita (all from Naga District), was merged to create the city of Kinokawa.
