= Ōtani Station (Wakayama) =

Railway station in Katsuragi, Wakayama Prefecture, Japan

Ōtani Station 大谷駅
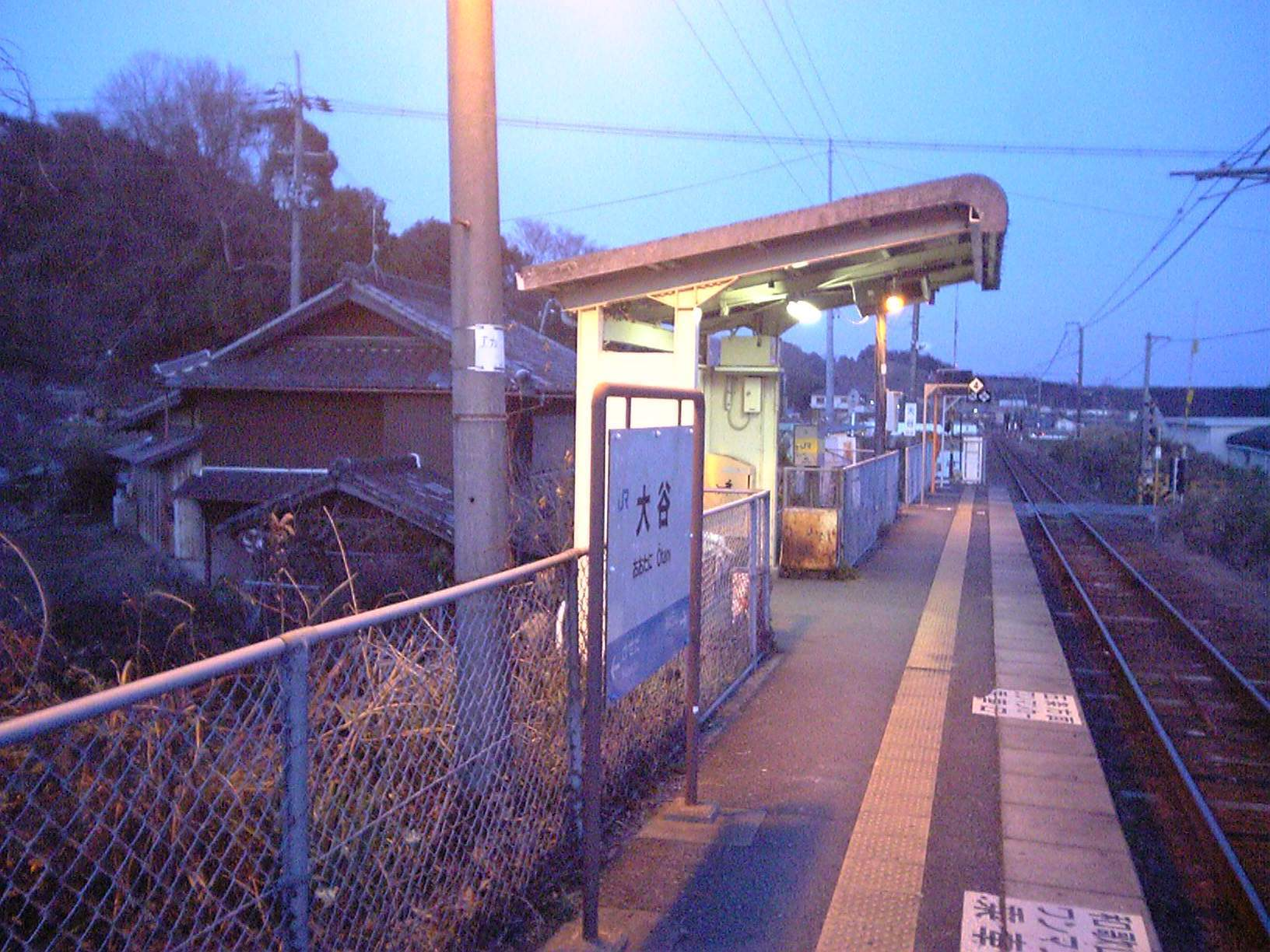
- Ōtani Station, February 2010

General information
- Location: 285-3 Ōtani, Katsuragi-cho, Ito-gun, Wakayama-ken 649-7173; Japan
- Coordinates: 34°17′56″N 135°29′39″E
- System: JR-West commuter rail station
- Owner: West Japan Railway Company
- Operator: West Japan Railway Company
- Line: T Wakayama Line
- Distance: 56.7 km (35.2 miles) from Ōji
- Platforms: 1 side platform
- Tracks: 1
- Train operators: West Japan Railway Company

Other information
- Status: Unstaffed
- Website: Official website

History
- Opened: 1 May 1952

Passengers
- FY2019: 97 daily
Services
Preceding station	JR-West	Following station
Wakayama Line
Myōji	Rapid Service	Kaseda
Myōji	Local	Kaseda
Location
- Location within Wakayama Prefecture Location within Japan

Ōtani Station (大谷駅, Ōtani-eki) is a passenger railway station in located in the town of Katsuragi, Wakayama Prefecture, Japan, operated by West Japan Railway Company (JR West).

== Lines ==
Ōtani Station is served by the Wakayama Line, and is located 56.7 kilometers from the terminus of the line at Ōji Station.

== Station layout ==
The station consists of one side platform serving a single bi-directional track. There is no station building, and the station is unattended.

== Adjacent stations ==
«	Service	»
West Japan Railway Company
Wakayama Line
Myōji	Rapid Service	Kaseda
Myōji	Local	Kaseda

== History ==
Ōtani Station opened on May 1, 1952. With the privatization of the Japan National Railways (JNR) on April 1, 1987, the station came under the aegis of the West Japan Railway Company.

== Passenger statistics ==
In fiscal 2019, the station was used by an average of 97 passengers daily (boarding passengers only).

== Surrounding Area ==
- Katsuragi Municipal Otani Elementary School

== See also ==
- List of railway stations in Japan
