= Kashiba City Nijyosan Museum =

Museum in Kashiba, Nara, Japan

- 香芝市二上山博物館
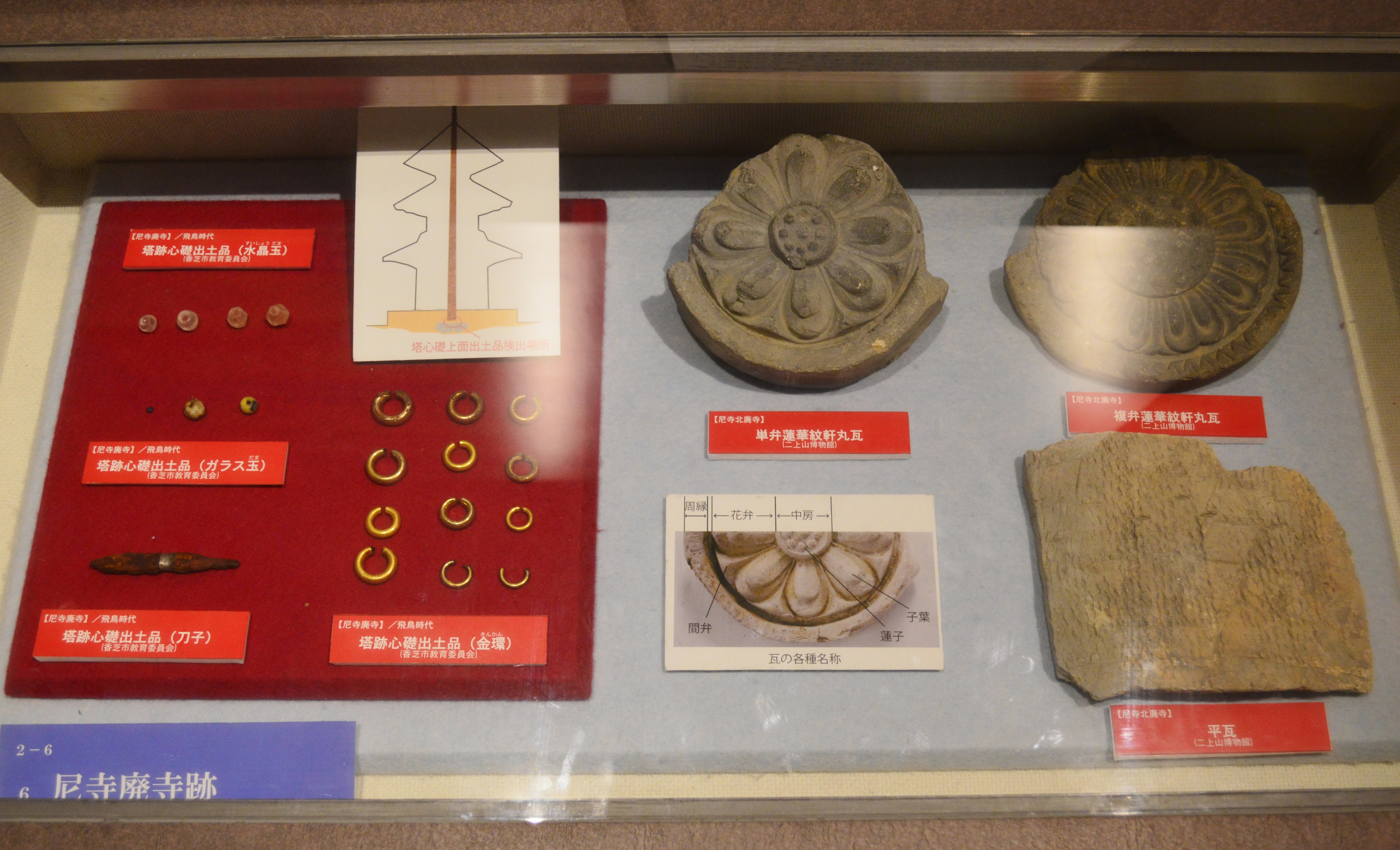
- artefacts from Ninji Haiji

General information
- Location: 1-17-17 Fujiyama, Kashiba, Nara Prefecture, Japan
- Coordinates: 34°32′33″N 135°41′57″E
- Opened: 2 April 1992

Website
- Official website (in Japanese)

Kashiba City Nijyosan Museum (香芝市二上山博物館, Kashiba-shi Nijō-san Hakubutsukan) opened in Kashiba, Nara Prefecture, Japan in 1992. Taking its name from the nearby Mount Nijō ("Futakami-yama" in the Man'yōshū), the museum is located on the first floor of the city's Futakami Bunka Center, with its storerooms in the basement floor below. The displays focus on the local sanukite, tuff, and emery sand from the eruption of Mount Nijō and on palaeolithic tools.

== See also ==
- The Museum, Archaeological Institute of Kashihara, Nara Prefecture
- Hirano Tsukaanayama Kofun
- Ninji temple ruins
