= Shimoda Station (disambiguation) =

Shimoda Station is a railway station in Aomori Prefecture, Japan.

Shimoda Station may also refer to:

- Kintetsu Shimoda Station in Nara Prefecture, Japan
- Izukyū Shimoda Station in Shizuoka Prefecture, Japan
- Kashiba Station in Nara Prefecture, Japan, formerly called Shimoda Station
