= Hirano Tsukaanayama Kofun =

Kofun period burial mound in Japan

Hirano Kofun cluster
- 平野古墳群 (Japanese)
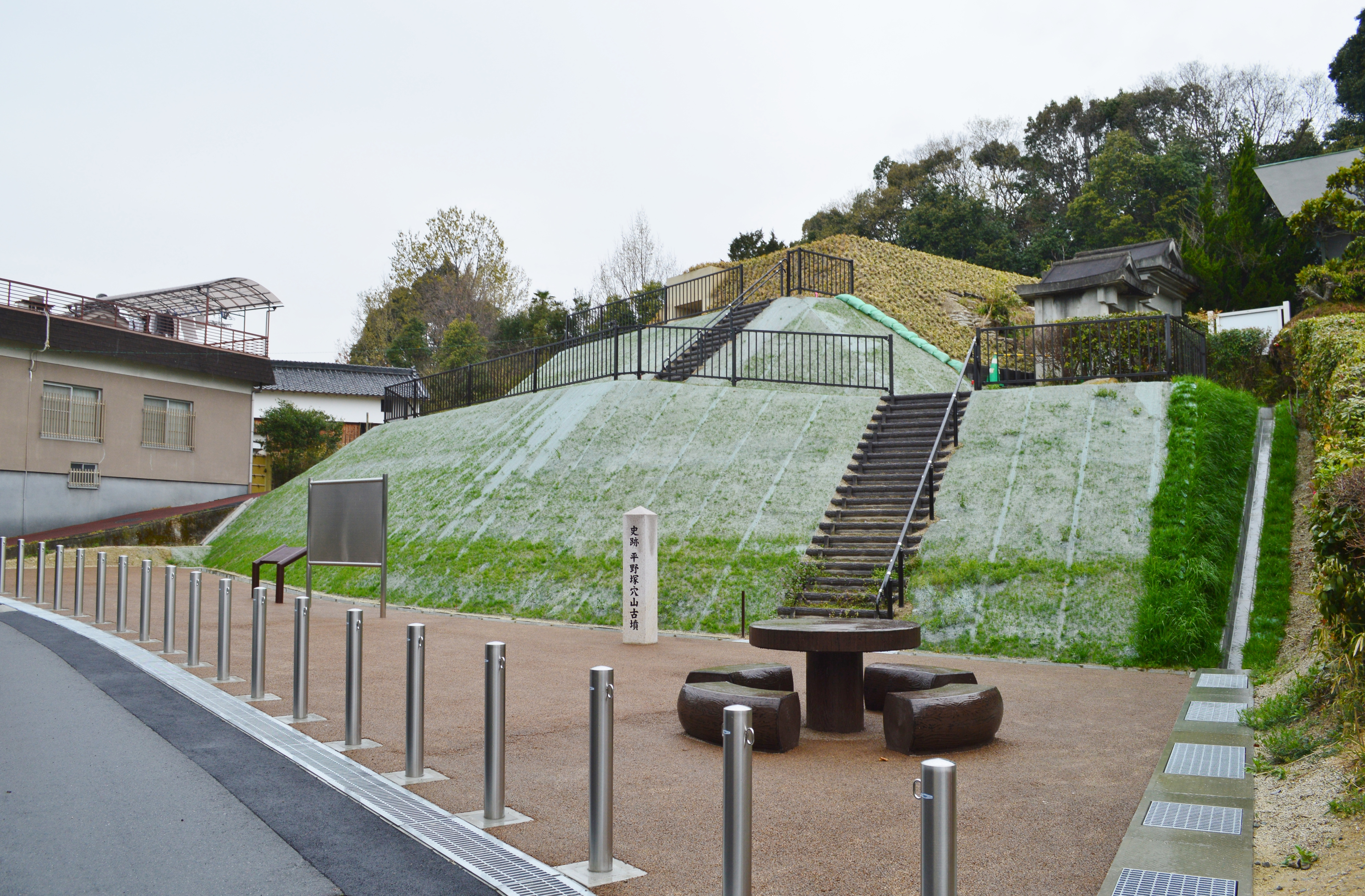
- Hirano Tsukaanayama Kofun

- Hirano Kofun cluster Hirano Tsukaanayama Kofun (Japan)
- Interactive map of Hirano Kofun cluster
- 34°34′01″N 135°41′41″E
- Type: Kofun
- Periods: Kofun period
- Location: Kashiba, Nara, Japan
- Region: Kansai region

History
- Built: c.7th century

Site notes
- Public access: Yes (park)

Hirano Kofun cluster (平野古墳群) is a cluster of at least six Kofun period burial mounds, located in the Hirano neighborhood of the town of Kashiba, Nara prefecture in the Kansai region of Japan. One of these tumuli, the Hirano Tsukaanayama Kofun (平野塚穴山古墳) was designated a National Historic Site of Japan in 1973.

== Overview ==
The Hirano Kofun cluster is located on the south slope of a ridge that branches off to the east from the northeastern foot of Mount Futakami, which forms the border between Osaka Prefecture and Nara Prefecture. Six kofun have been confirmed so far; however, currently, only three (Kofun No. 1, 2, and 5) remain. On the northern slope of the same hill as the Hirano Kofun Group, Hirano Kilns 1–3, which were the first to fire Sue ware pottery in the Nara Basin, and Hirano Kilns 4–5, which fired Sue ware and roof tiles, have been identified. To the north of that are the Ninji temple ruins, with a separate National Historic Site designation.

Currently, the Hirano Kofun cluster site has been developed into the Hirano Tsukaanayama Tomb Historic Site Park, and is about a 15-minute walk from Shizumi Station on the JR West Wakayama Line.

=== Hirano Tsukaanayama Kofun ===
Kofun No.5 in the Hirano Kofun cluster is named the "Tsukaanayama Kofun". It is a square hōfun (方墳)-style tumulus with a side length of about 21 meters and a height of about 4 meters. The burial chamber is made from cut tuff stones, with an entrance to the south, and the interior is 1.75 meters high and is divided into an antechamber (3.05 meters long, 1.5 meters wide) and an entrance passage (0.8 meters long, 1.4 meters wide), with a gate (0.5 meters long, 1.2 meters wide) between them. The floor of the chamber is made up of 21 small cut stones, one for the back wall, two for each side wall, and two for the ceiling stone, and the entire inside of the chamber has been carefully polished. It has been open since ancient times, and appears in a Genroku period map depicting it in this state, so the details of any grave goods is unknown. This same map identifies the tumulus as the grave of Emperor Kenzō, although this identification is not supported by the Imperial Household Agency. It was excavated in 1972, during which time coffin fragments made of overlapping lacquered cloth were found. In addition, 11 fragments of copper products, including one earring and one hollow ball, as well as fragments of what is believed to be a copper pot, were excavated, as well as a lacquered basket made of woven hemp and coated with lacquer, and a lacquer basket made of cloth and coated with lacquer. From the structure of the mound and these artifacts, it is estimated that the tumulus was constructed at the very end of the Kofun period.

=== Hirano Kofun No.2 and No.1 ===
Of the group of tombs, Hirano Kofun No. 2 has a horizontal-entry stone burial chamber measuring approximately 10.6 meters in length, making it one of the largest of the late Kofun tombs in the Kitakitsuragi region. This tomb is unique in that part of the burial chamber is made of tuff (mostly granite from Mount Nijō, whereas the coffin base is made of earthen bricks and a support stand. Hirano Kofun No. 1 also has a horizontal-entry stone burial chamber made entirely of Mount Nijō tuff, including the stone coffin, which is made out of a hollowed-out block of granite. These tumuli are both enfun (円墳)-style circular tumuli with diameters of 26 meters, and both are also estimated to have been built in the 7th century, at the end of the Kofun period. No previous construction of tombs is known in this area, and the group of tombs suddenly began to be built in the 7th century. It is believed that these tumuli are the tombs of the Kayano clan, descendants of Emperor Bidatsu, who ruled the region during this period.

== Gallery ==
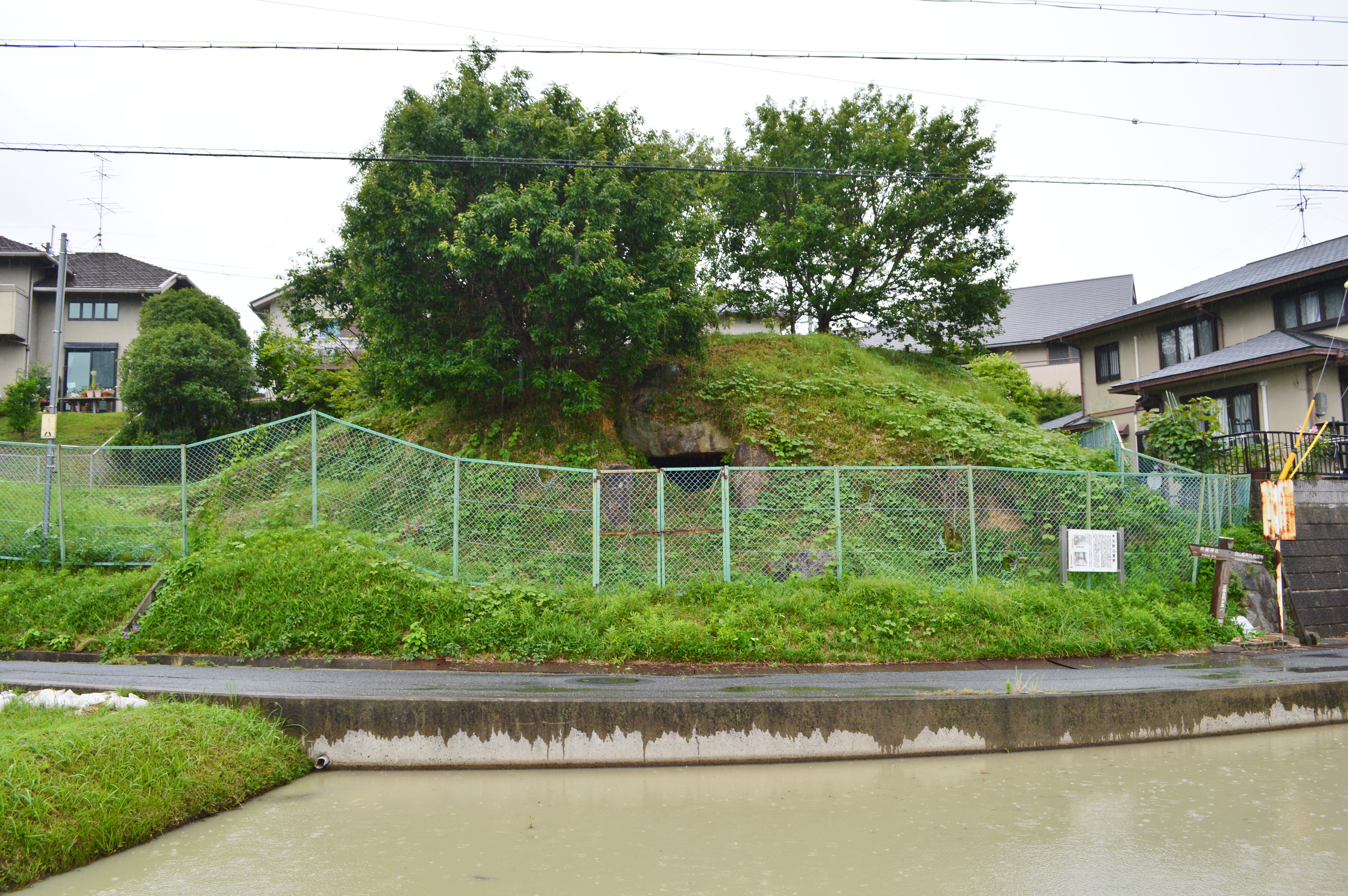
Hirano Kurumazuka Kofun（Kofun No.1）

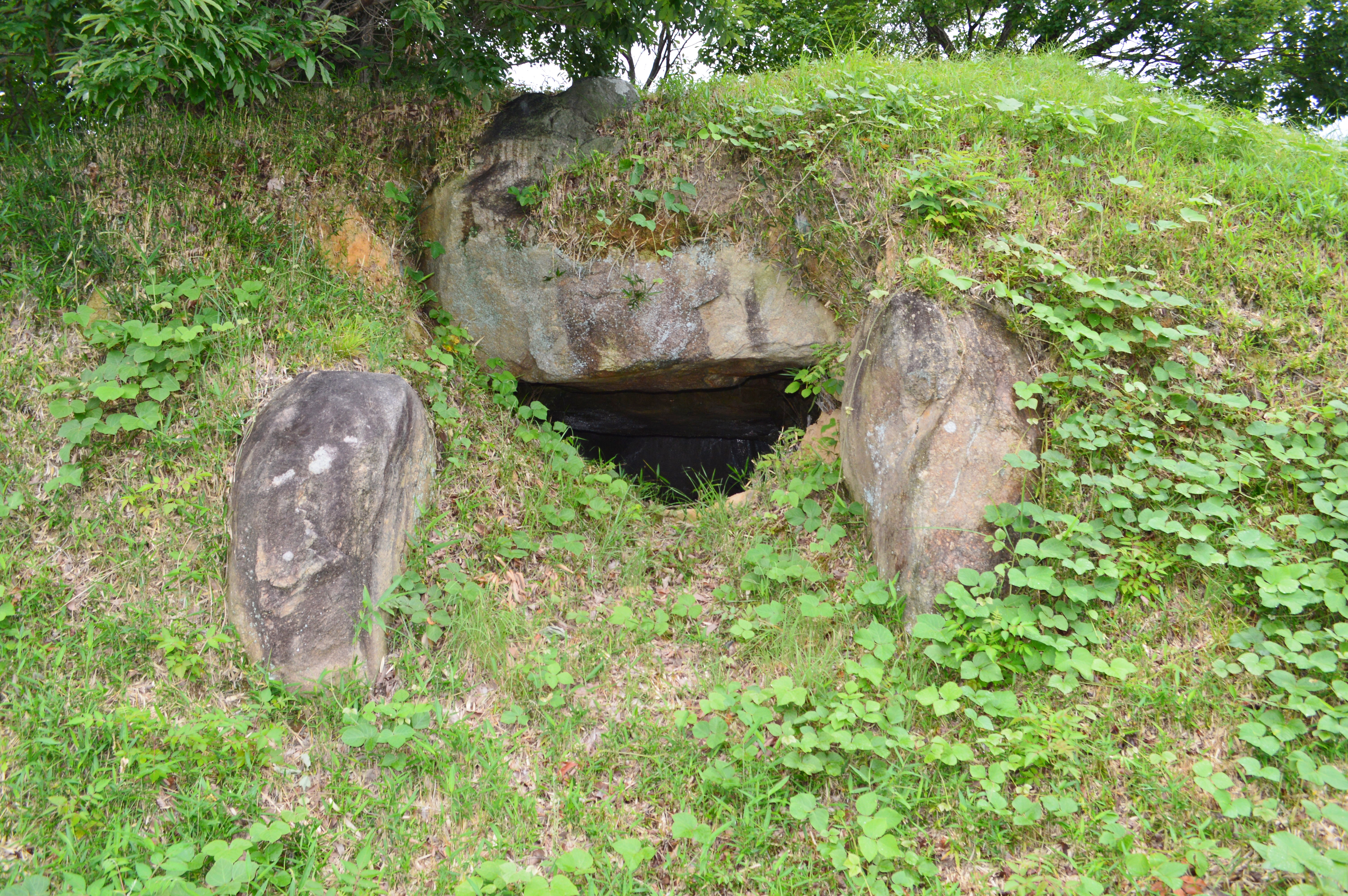
Hirano Kurumazuka Kofun Burial Chamber（Kofun No.1）

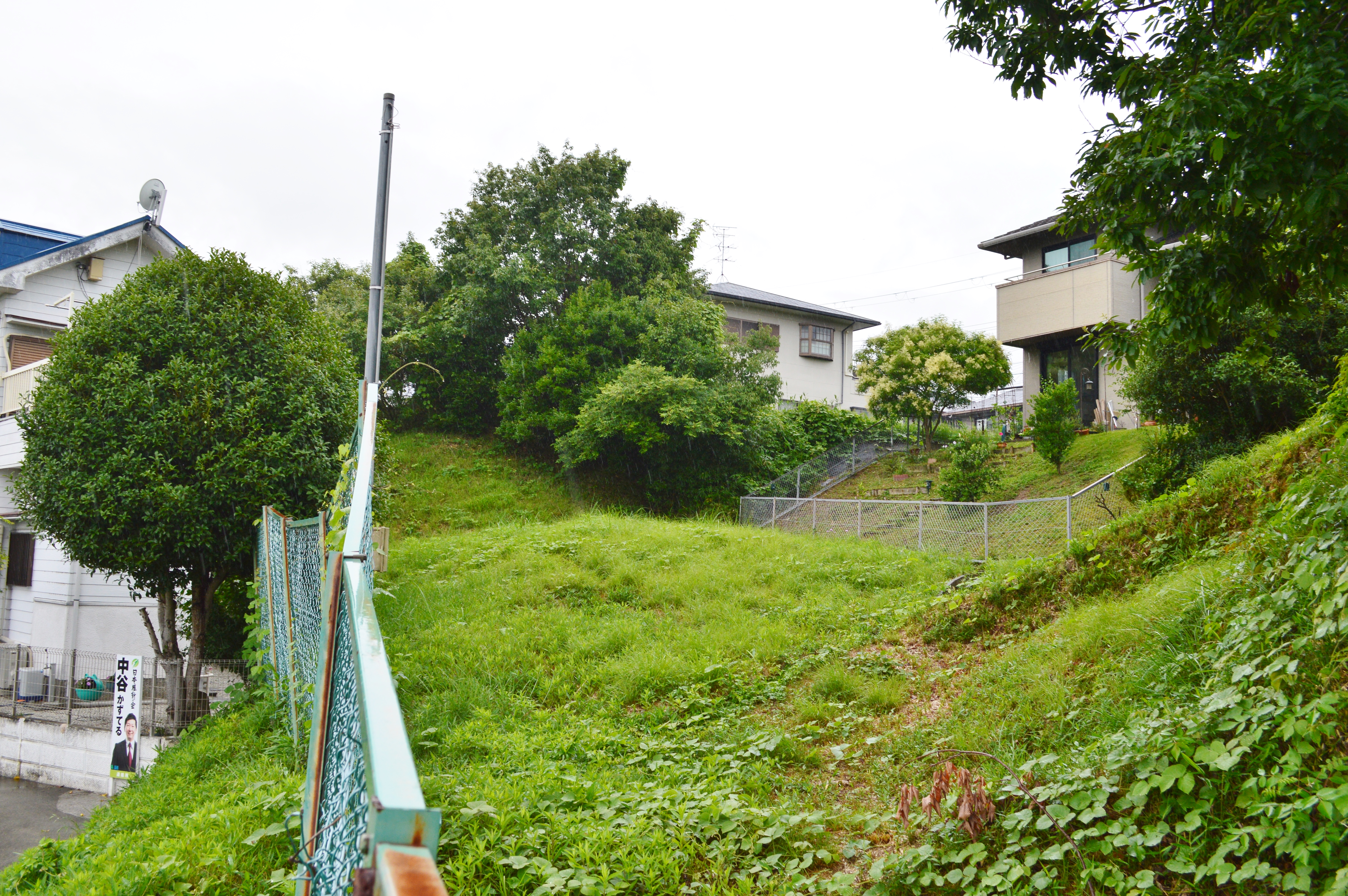
Hirano Kofun No.2

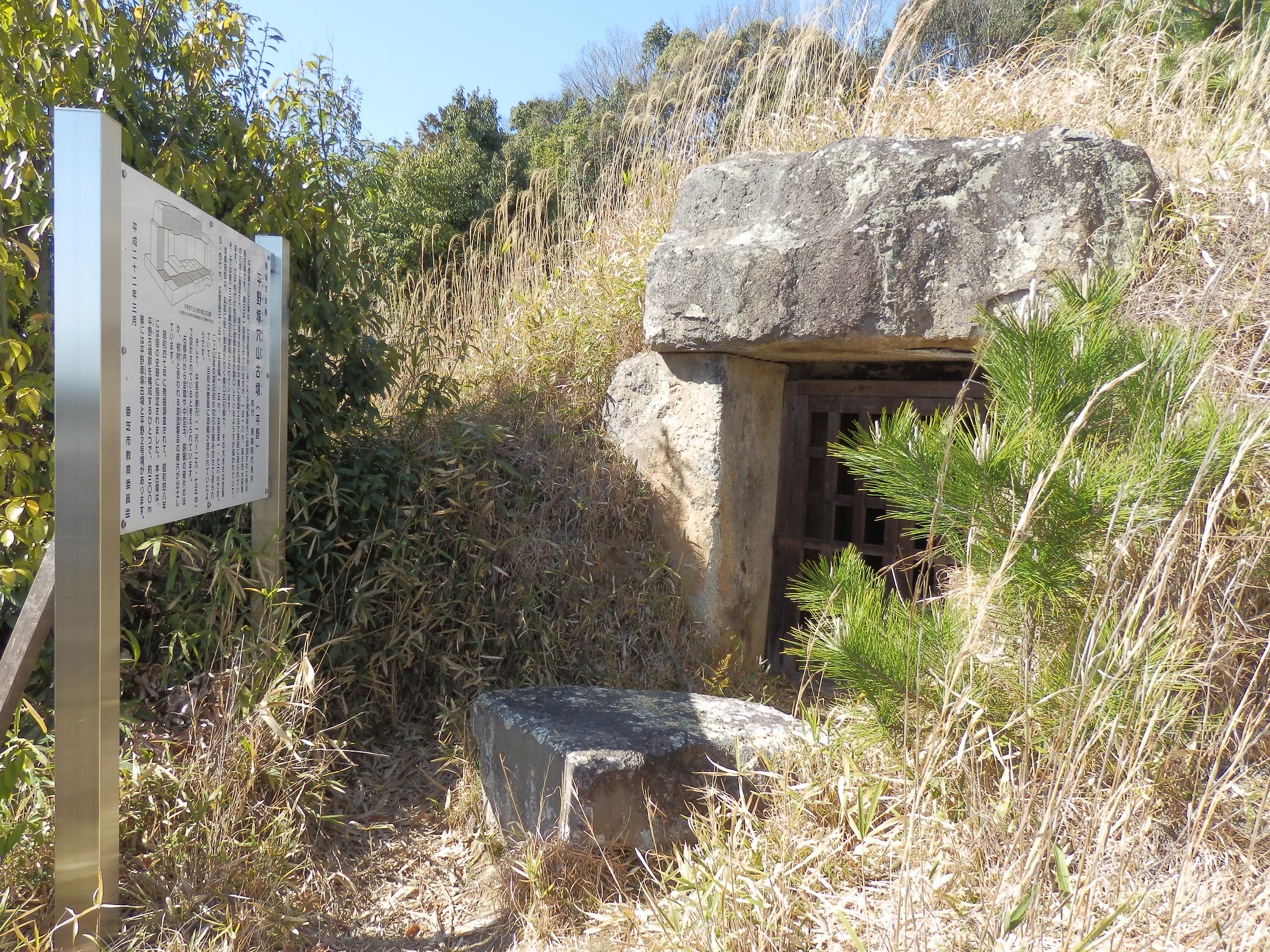
Hirano Tsukaanayama Kofun

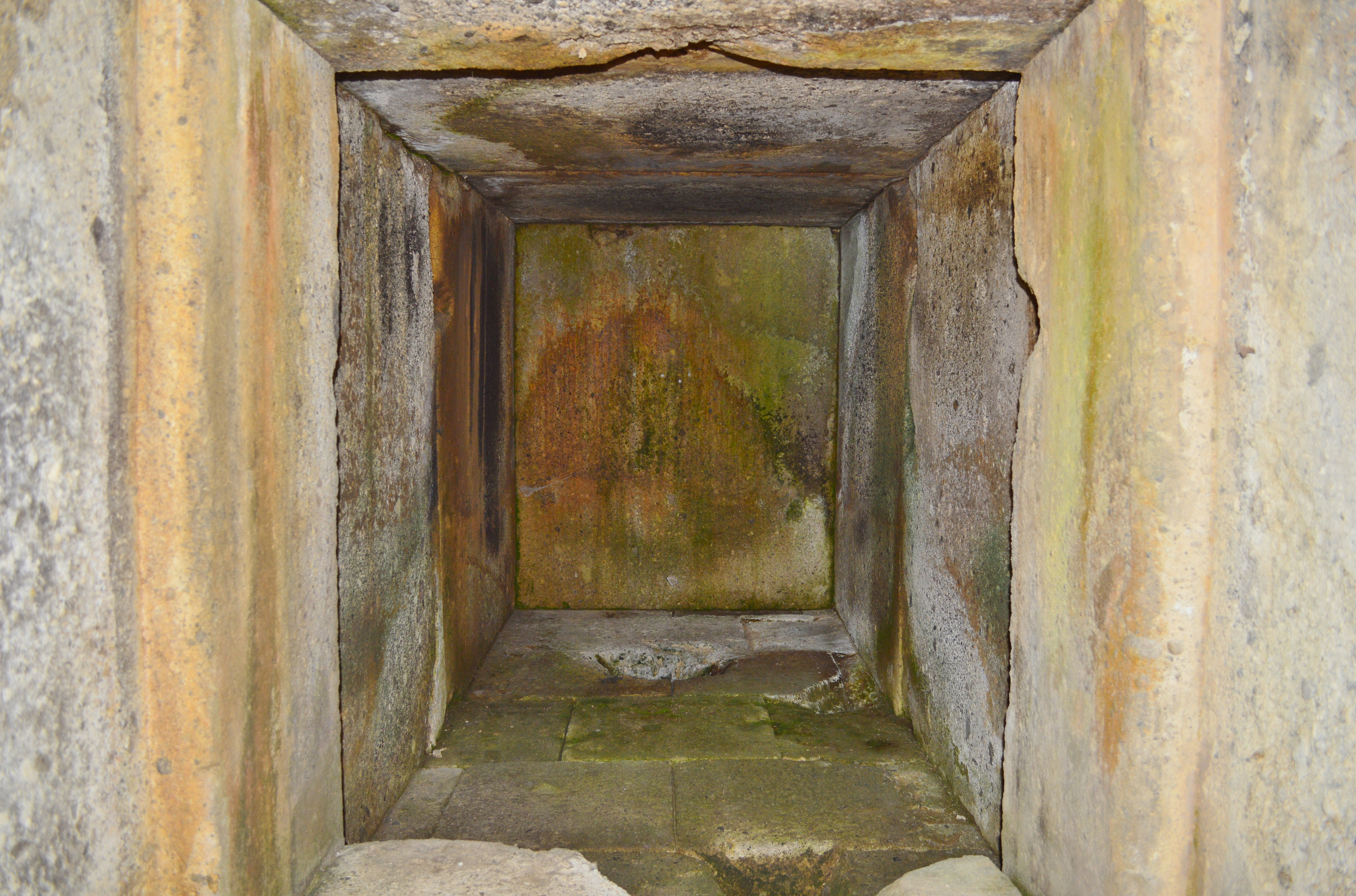
Hirano Tsukaanayama Kofun Burial Chamber

== See also ==
- List of Historic Sites of Japan (Nara)
