= JR Goidō Station =

Railway station in Kashiba, Nara Prefecture, Japan

JR Goidō Station JR五位堂駅
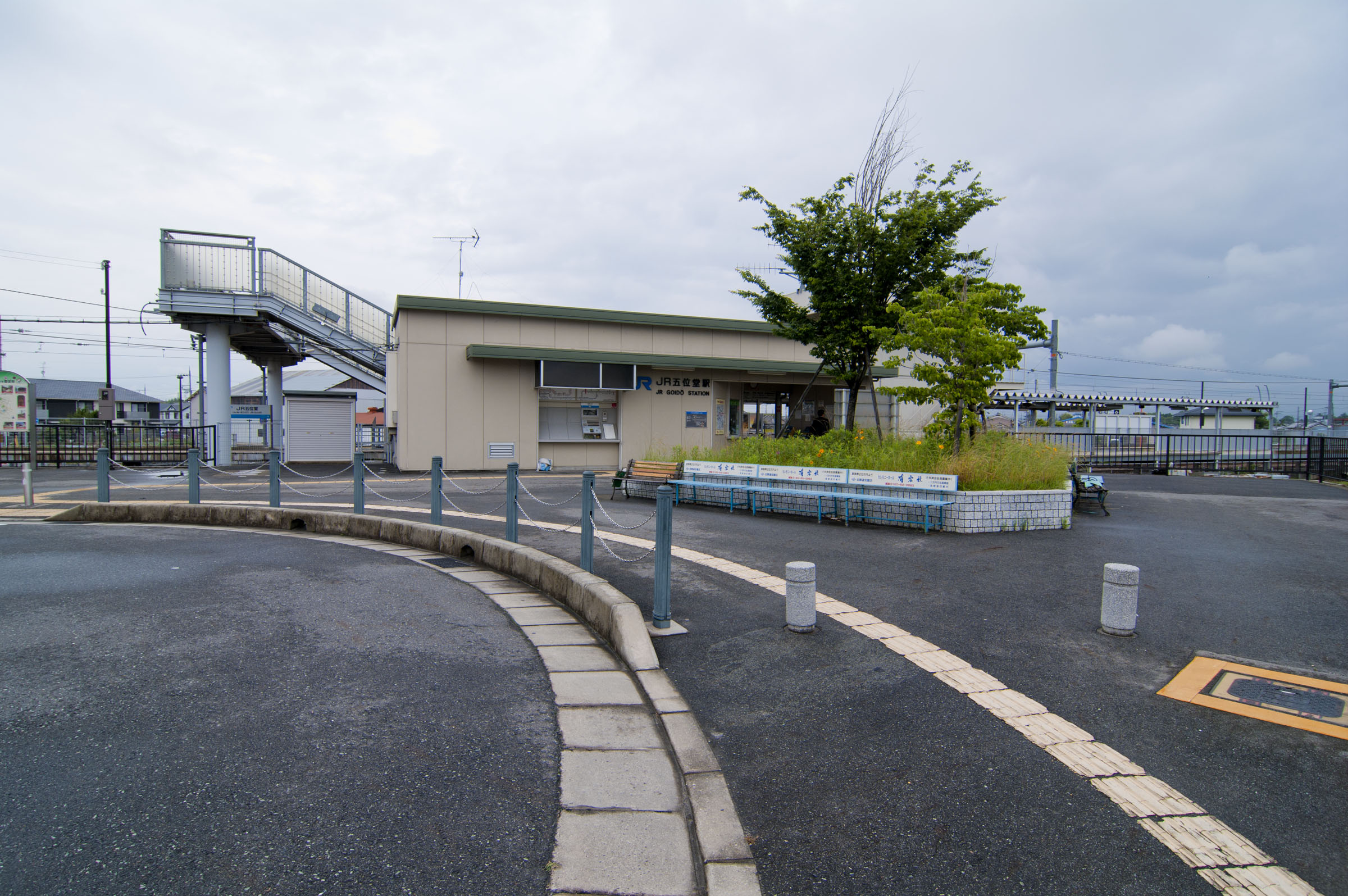
- JR Goidō Station

General information
- Location: 55, Goidō 6-chōme, Kashiba-shi, Nara-ken 639-0226; Japan
- Coordinates: 34°31′39″N 135°43′06″E
- System: JR-West commuter rail station
- Owner: West Japan Railway Company
- Operator: JR West Koutsu Service
- Line: T Wakayama Line
- Distance: 8.7 km (5.4 miles) from Ōji
- Platforms: 2 side platforms
- Tracks: 2
- Train operators: West Japan Railway Company
- Connections: None

Construction
- Structure type: At grade
- Parking: None
- Cycle facilities: Available
- Accessible: Yes (1 accessible slope for the southbound platform and 1 accessible bathroom)

Other information
- Website: http://www.jr-odekake.net/eki/top.php?id=0621804

History
- Opened: 13 March 2004

Passengers
- 2020: 623 daily
Services
Preceding station	JR-West	Following station
T Wakayama Line
Takada	Local	Kashiba
Takada	Regional Rapid Service	Kashiba; One-way
Takada; One-way	Rapid Service (through to the Yamatoji Line)	Kashiba
Takada; Terminus	Rapid Service (through to the Yamatoji Line)	Kashiba
Takada	Yamatoji Rapid Service	Kashiba; One-way
Location

JR Goidō Station (JR五位堂駅, Jeiāru Goidō-eki) is a passenger railway station in located in the city of Kashiba, Nara Prefecture, Japan, operated by West Japan Railway Company (JR West).

== Lines ==
JR Goidō Station is served by the Wakayama Line, and is located 8.7 kilometers from the terminus of the line at Ōji.

== Station layout ==
The station is an above-ground station with two opposed side platforms connected by a footbridge. The station is staffed.

=== Platforms ===
1	■ T Wakayama Line	for Ōji and Tennōji
2	■ T Wakayama Line	for Takada, Sakurai and Gojō

== History ==
JR Goidō Station started operation as Goidō Signal Box, a signal box with a crossing loop to exchange trains on the single track Wakayama Line on 8 February 1940. The signal box was discontinued on 15 July 1949, but it was reopened on 27 December 1955. On 13 March 2004, the signal box was converted to a passenger station and the present station name was assigned. Goidō Station on Kintetsu Osaka Line is a separate station. This is why the new JR station was named with the prefix "JR".

== Passenger statistics ==
In fiscal 2020, the station was used by an average of 623 passengers daily (boarding passengers only).

== Surrounding Area ==
- Kintetsu Railway Goidō Station

== See also ==
- List of railway stations in Japan
