= Hatakeda Station =

Railway station in Ōji, Nara Prefecture, Japan

Hatakeda Station 畠田駅
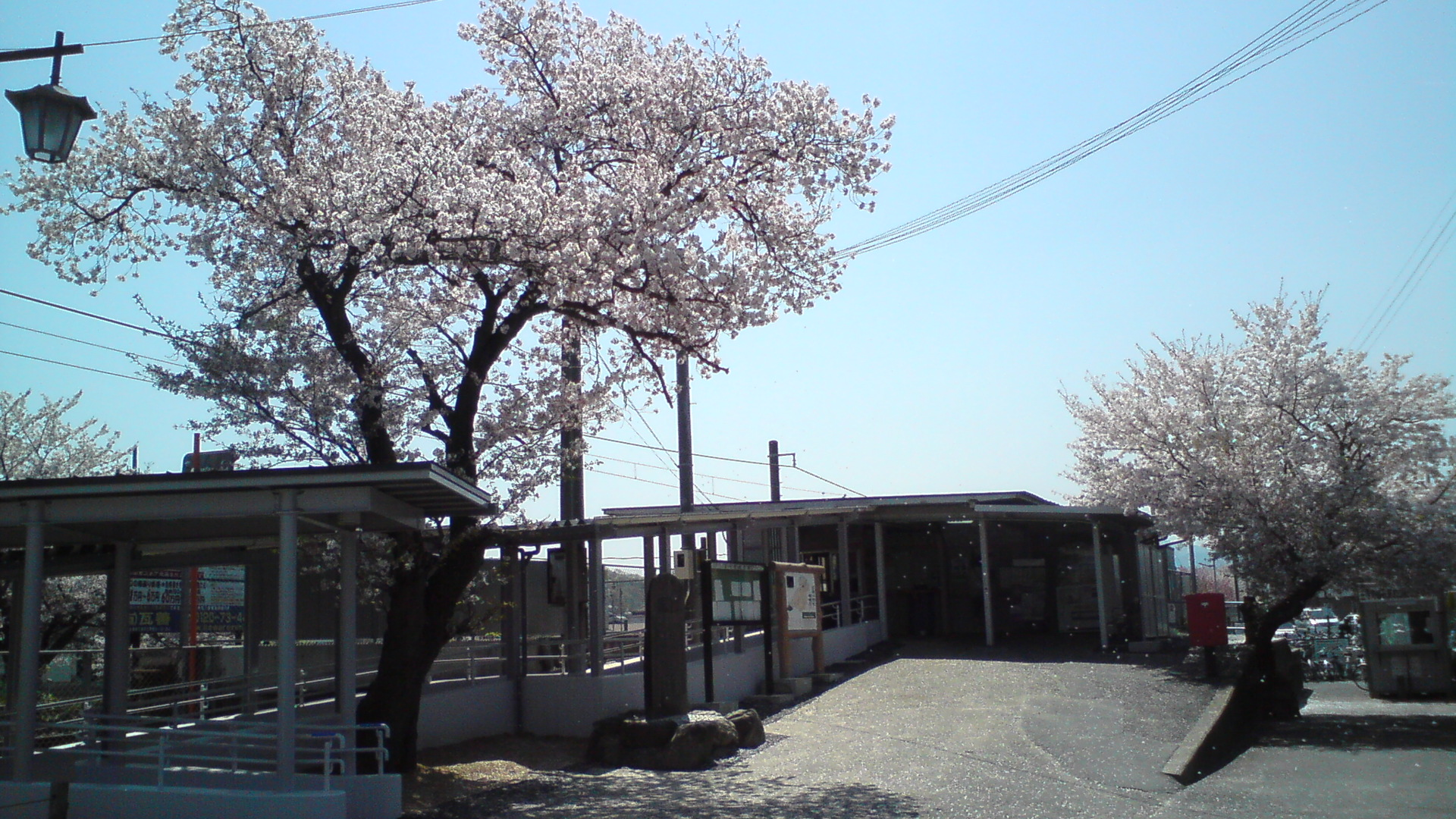
- Hatakeda Station

General information
- Location: 9, Hatakeda 3-chōme, Ōji-machi, Kitakatsuragi-gun, Nara-ken 636-0021; Japan
- Coordinates: 34°34′42″N 135°42′14″E
- System: JR-West commuter rail station
- Owner: West Japan Railway Company
- Operator: JR West Koutsu Service
- Line: T Wakayama Line
- Distance: 2.6 km (1.6 miles) from Ōji
- Platforms: 1 side platform
- Tracks: 1
- Train operators: West Japan Railway Company
- Connections: Nara Kotsu Bus Lines 10・12・80・82 at Hatakeda-8-chōme

Construction
- Structure type: At grade
- Parking: None
- Cycle facilities: Available
- Accessible: Yes (1 accessible bathroom)

Other information
- Website: http://www.jr-odekake.net/eki/top.php?id=0621801

History
- Opened: 27 December 1955
- Electrified: 1980

Passengers
- FY 2020: 1342 daily
Services
Preceding station	JR-West	Following station
T Wakayama Line
Shizumi	Local	Ōji
Shizumi	Regional Rapid Service	Ōji; One-way
Kashiba; One-way	Rapid Service (through to the Yamatoji Line)	Ōji
Shizumi	Rapid Service (through to the Yamatoji Line)	Ōji
Shizumi	Yamatoji Rapid Service	Ōji; One-way
Location
- Location within Nara Prefecture Location within Kansai region Location within Japan

Hatakeda Station (畠田駅, Hatakeda-eki) is a passenger railway station located in the city of Ōji, Nara, Japan. It is operated by the West Japan Railway Company (JR-West).

== Lines ==
The station is served by the Wakayama Line and is 2.6 kilometers from the starting point of the line at Ōji .

== Layout ==
The station is an above-ground station with one side platform and one track located on the right side facing Takada.

== History ==
Hatakeda Station was opened on 27 December1955 along with the neighboring Shizumi Station on the Japanese National Railways Wakayama Line. With the privatization of the Japan National Railways (JNR) on 1 April 1987, the station was transferred to JR West.

== Passenger statistics ==
The average daily passenger traffic in fiscal 2020 was 1342 passengers.。

== Surrounding area ==
- Japan National Route 168

== See also ==
- List of railway stations in Japan
