= Kashiba =

Kashiba 香芝市
- City
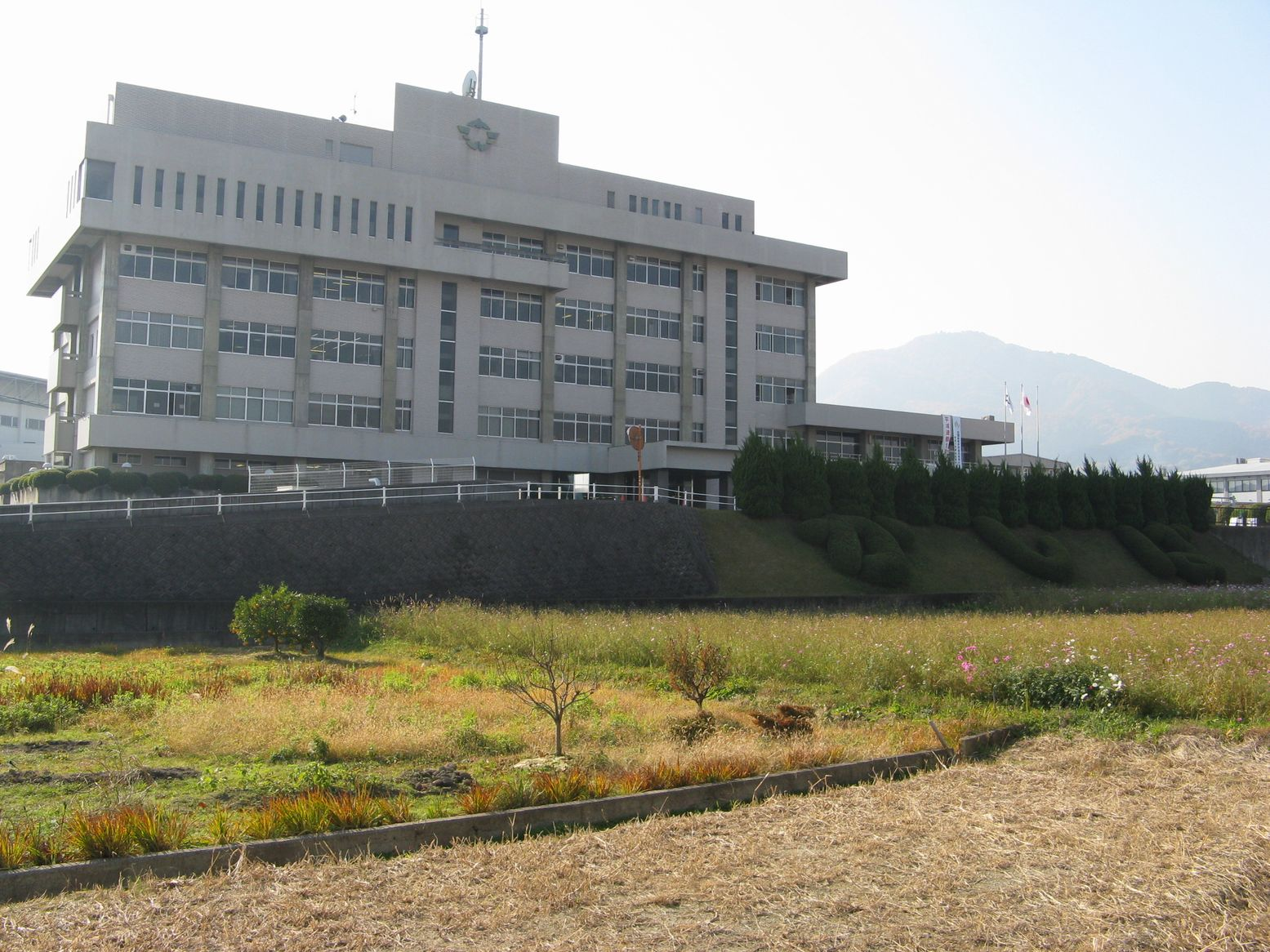
- Kashiba city office

- Flag Emblem

- Location in Japan
- Coordinates: 34°32′29″N 135°41′57″E
- Country: Japan
- Region: Kansai
- Prefecture: Nara
- First official recorded: 139 BC (official estimited)
- Town settled: April 1, 1956
- City Settled: October 1, 1991

Government
  - Mayor: Kazushi Mihashi

Area
  - Total: 24.26 km^{2} (9.37 sq mi)

Population (November 30, 2024)
  - Total: 78,357
  - Density: 3,230/km^{2} (8,365/sq mi)
- Time zone: UTC+09:00 (JST)
- City hall address: 1397 Honmachi, Kashiba-shi, Nara-ken 639-0292
- Website: Official website
- Symbols
- Flower: Violet
- Tree: Oak

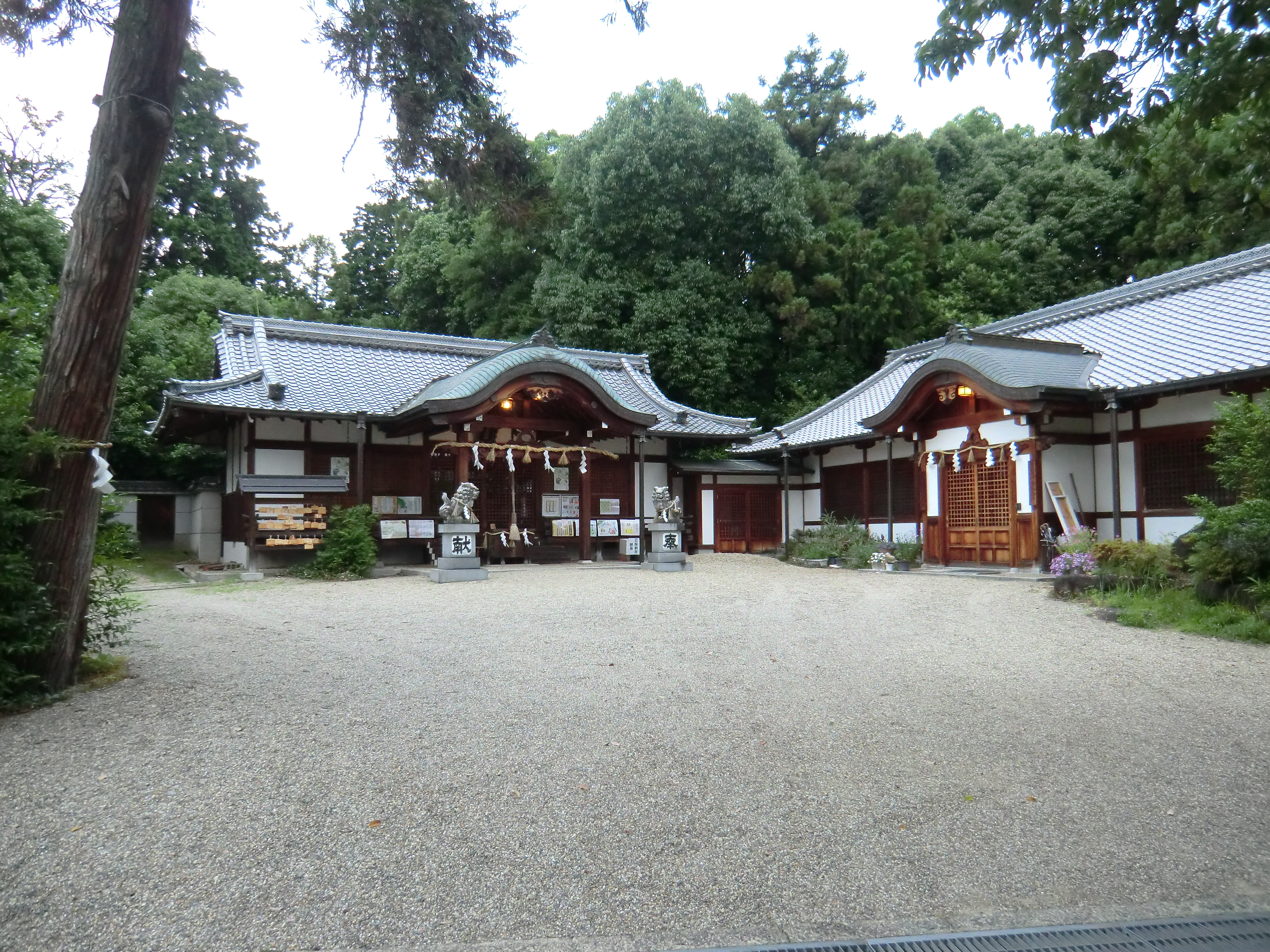
Kashima Jinja in Kashiba

Kashiba (香芝市, Kashiba-shi) is a city located in Nara Prefecture, Japan. As of 30 November 2024, the city had an estimated population of 78,357 in 33199 households, and a population density of 3200 persons per km^{2}. The total area of the city is 24.26 km^{2} (9.37 sq mi).

== Geography ==
Kashiba is located at the western edge of the Nara Basin. The city spreads out over an alluvial fan at the eastern foot of Mount Nijō. It borders Osaka Prefecture and has developed as a residential area near Osaka

=== Surrounding municipalities ===
Nara Prefecture

- Yamatotakada
- Katsuragi
- Ōji
- Kanmaki
- Kōryō

Osaka Prefecture

- Habikino
- Kashiwara
- Taishi

=== Climate ===
Kashiba has a humid subtropical climate (Köppen Cfa) characterized by warm summers and cool winters with light to no snowfall. The average annual temperature in Kashiba is 14.2 °C. The average annual rainfall is 1636 mm with September as the wettest month. The temperatures are highest on average in August, at around 26.4 °C, and lowest in January, at around 2.7 °C.

=== Demographics ===
Per Japanese census data, the population of Kashiba is as shown below

Historical population
Year	Pop.	±%
1940	11,151	—
1950	14,980	+34.3%
1960	15,009	+0.2%
1970	21,205	+41.3%
1980	36,314	+71.3%
1990	52,817	+45.4%
2000	63,487	+20.2%
2010	75,227	+18.5%
2020	78,113	+3.8%

== History ==
The area of Kashiba was part of ancient Yamato Province. The town of Kashiba was established on April 1, 1956 by the merger of villages of Goido, Shimoda, Futagami, and Shitomi in Kitakatsuragi District. Kashiba was raised to city status on October 1, 1991.

== Government ==
Kashiba has a mayor-council form of government with a directly elected mayor and a unicameral city council of 16 members. Kashiba contributes two members to the Nara Prefectural Assembly. In terms of national politics, the town is part of the Nara 2nd district of the lower house of the Diet of Japan.

== Economy ==
The local economy is based on agriculture and light manufacturing. The city is increasingly a commuter town for the greater Osaka metropolis with numerous new town developments.

== Education ==
Kashiba has 11 public elementary schools and five public junior high school operated by the town government and two public high schools operated by the Nara Prefectural Board of Education.

== Transportation ==
=== Railways ===
JR West – Wakayama Line

T Shizumi - Kashiba - JR Goidō

Kintetsu Railway - Osaka Line

Sekiya - Nijō - Kintetsu Shimoda - Goidō

Kintetsu Railway - Minami Osaka Line

Nijōzan

=== Highways ===
- Nishi-Meihan Expressway
- National Route 165
- National Route 168

== Local attractions ==
- Hirano Tsukaanayama Kofun, National Historic Site
- Ninji temple ruins, National Historic Site

== Notable people from Kashiba ==
- Kazue Fukiishi; actress
- Ryōko Shiraishi; voice actress, singer
