= Kashiba Station =

Railway station in Kashiba, Nara Prefecture, Japan

Kashiba Station 香芝駅
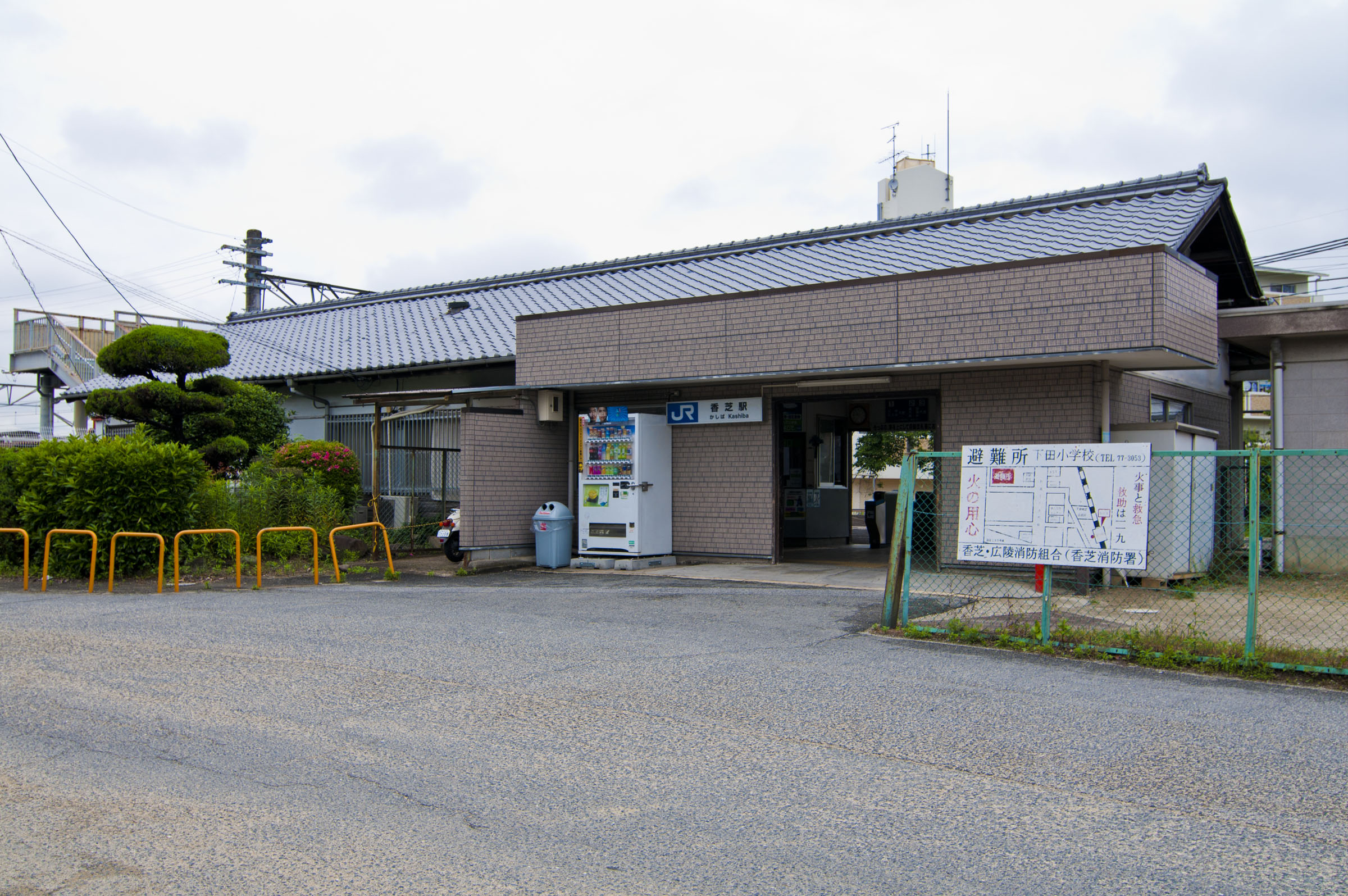
- Kashiba Station

General information
- Location: 1, Shimodanishi 1-chōme, Kashiba-shi, Nara-ken 639-0231; Japan
- Coordinates: 34°32′35″N 135°42′21″E
- System: JR-West commuter rail station
- Owner: West Japan Railway Company
- Operator: JR West Koutsu Service
- Line: T Wakayama Line
- Distance: 6.6 km (4.1 miles) from Ōji
- Platforms: 1 side+ 1 island platform
- Tracks: 3
- Train operators: West Japan Railway Company
- Bus stands: 1
- Connections: Kashiba City Public Bus Shuttle

Construction
- Structure type: At grade
- Parking: None
- Cycle facilities: Available
- Accessible: No

Other information
- Website: https://www.jr-odekake.net/eki/top.php?id=0621803

History
- Opened: 1 March 1891
- Former names: Shimoda (1891—2004)

Passengers
- FY2022: 1304 daily
Services
| Preceding station | JR-West | Following station |
T Wakayama Line
| JR Goidō | Local | Shizumi |
| JR Goidō | Regional Rapid Service | Shizumi; One-way |
| JR Goidō; One-way | Rapid Service (through to the Yamatoji Line) | Shizumi |
| JR Goidō | Rapid Service (through to the Yamatoji Line) | Shizumi |
| JR Goidō | Yamatoji Rapid Service | Shizumi; One-way |
Location

Kashiba Station (香芝駅, Kashiba-eki) is a passenger railway station in located in the city of Kashiba, Nara Prefecture, Japan, operated by West Japan Railway Company (JR West).

== Lines ==
Kashiba Station is served by the Wakayama Line, and is located 6.6 kilometers from the terminus of the line at Ōji.

== Station layout ==
The station is an above-ground station with one side platform and one island platform. The platform height has not been raised since the days of the Japanese National Railways, and is low compared to the train floor. The station building is located on the platform 1 side, and is connected to the island platforms 2 and 3 by a footbridge. The station is staffed.

=== Platforms ===
| 1 | ■ T Wakayama Line | for Ōji and Tennōji |
| 2 | ■ T Wakayama Line | Deadhead or extra trains only—de facto auxiliary |
| 3 | ■ T Wakayama Line | for Takada, Sakurai and Gojō |

== History ==
Kashiba Station opened as Shimoda Station (下田駅) on 1 March 1894 on the Osaka Railway. The Osaka Railway was taken over by the Kansai Railway on 6 June 1900, which was then nationalized on 1 October 1907. With the privatization of the Japan National Railways (JNR) on April 1, 1987, the station came under the aegis of the West Japan Railway Company. The station name was changed to its present name on 13 March 2004

== Passenger statistics ==
In fiscal 2022, the station was used by an average of 1304 passengers daily (boarding passengers only).

== Surrounding Area ==
- Kashiba City Hall
- Kashima Shrine
- Kintetsu Shimoda Station on Kintetsu Osaka Line.

== See also ==
- List of railway stations in Japan
