= Shizumi Station =

Railway station in Kashiba, Nara Prefecture, Japan

Shizumi Station 志都美駅
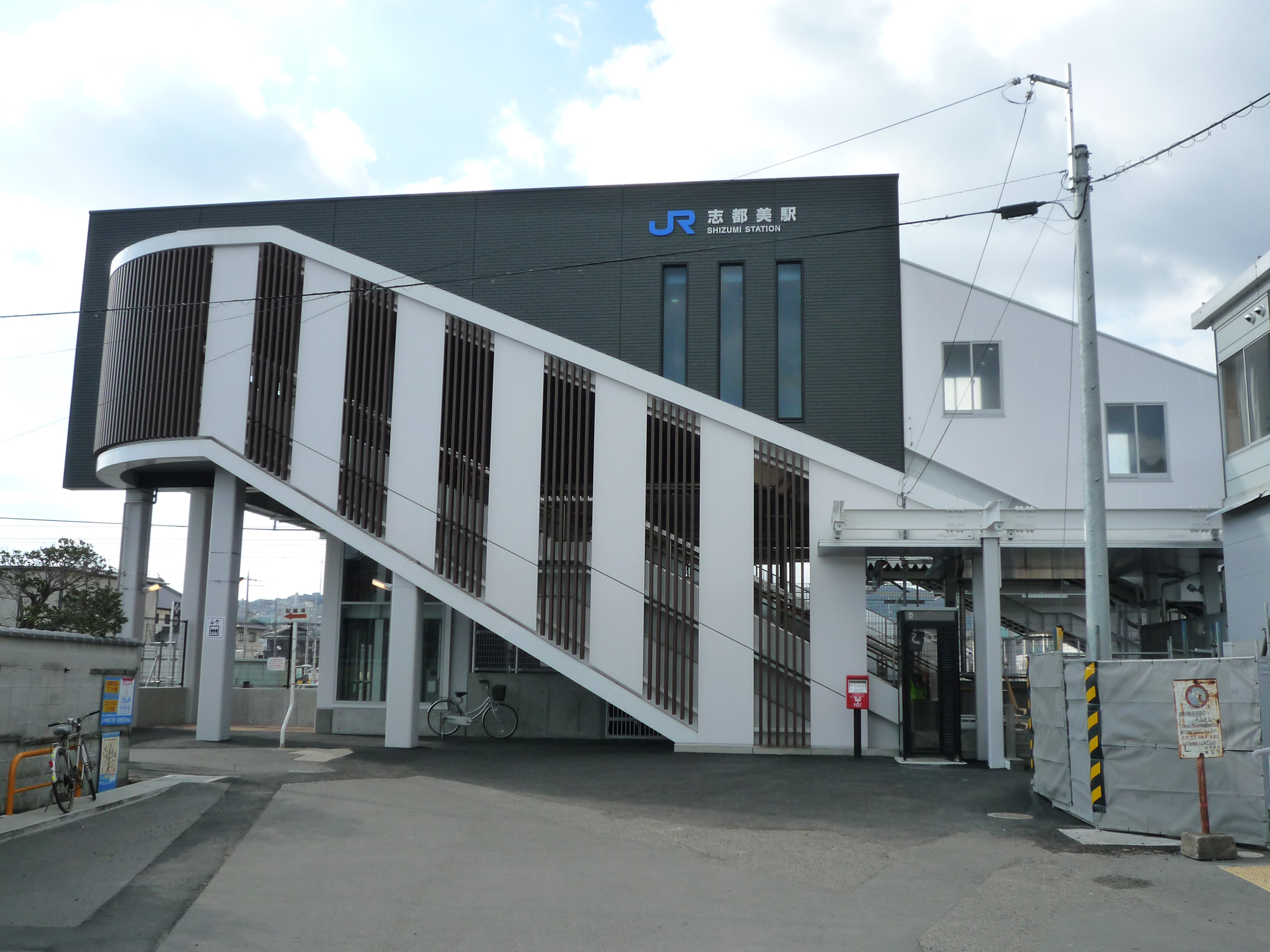
- The east entrance of Shizumi Station

General information
- Location: 188, Kaminaka, Kashiba-shi, Nara-ken 639-0265; Japan
- Coordinates: 34°33′41″N 135°42′07″E
- System: JR-West commuter rail station
- Owner: West Japan Railway Company
- Operator: JR West Koutsu Service
- Line: T Wakayama Line
- Distance: 4.5 km (2.8 miles) from Ōji
- Platforms: 2 side platforms
- Tracks: 2
- Train operators: West Japan Railway Company
- Connections: Kashiba City Public Bus North Route at Kashiba-inter

Construction
- Structure type: At grade
- Parking: None
- Cycle facilities: Available
- Accessible: Yes (2 elevators for the ticket gate, 2 for the platforms, and 1 accessible bathroom)

Other information
- Website: http://www.jr-odekake.net/eki/top.php?id=0621802

History
- Opened: 27 December 1955; 70 years ago
- Rebuilt: 2010; 16 years ago
- Electrified: 1980; 46 years ago

Passengers
- FY2019: 1605 daily
Services
| Preceding station | JR-West | Following station |
T Wakayama Line
| Kashiba | Local | Hatakeda |
| Kashiba | Regional Rapid Service | Hatakeda; One-way |
| Kashiba; One-way | Rapid Service (through to the Yamatoji Line) | Hatakeda |
| Kashiba | Rapid Service (through to the Yamatoji Line) | Hatakeda |
| Kashiba | Yamatoji Rapid Service | Hatakeda; One-way |
Location

Shizumi Station (志都美駅, Shizumi-eki)is a passenger railway station in located in the city of Kashiba, Nara Prefecture, Japan, operated by West Japan Railway Company (JR West).

== Lines ==
Shizumi Station is served by the Wakayama Line, and is located 4.5 kilometers from the terminus of the line at Ōji.

== Station layout ==
The station consists of two opposed side platform connected by an elevated station building. The station is staffed.

=== Platforms ===
| 1 | ■ T Wakayama Line | for Takada, Sakurai and Gojō |
| 2 | ■ T Wakayama Line | for Ōji and Tennōji |

== History ==
Shizumi Station opened as a signal stop on 6 February 1940. It was elevated to a station on 27 December 1955. With the privatization of the Japan National Railways (JNR) on April 1, 1987, the station came under the aegis of the West Japan Railway Company. The current station building was completed in 2010.

== Passenger statistics ==
In fiscal 2020, the station was used by an average of 1605 passengers daily (boarding passengers only).

== Surrounding Area ==
- Japan National Route 168
- Shizumi Shrine
- Kashiba City Shizumi Elementary School

== See also ==
- List of railway stations in Japan
