= Ninji temple ruins =

Archaeological site in Nara, Japan

Coordinates: 34°34′26.32″N 135°42′2.00″E

- 尼寺廃寺跡 (Japanese)
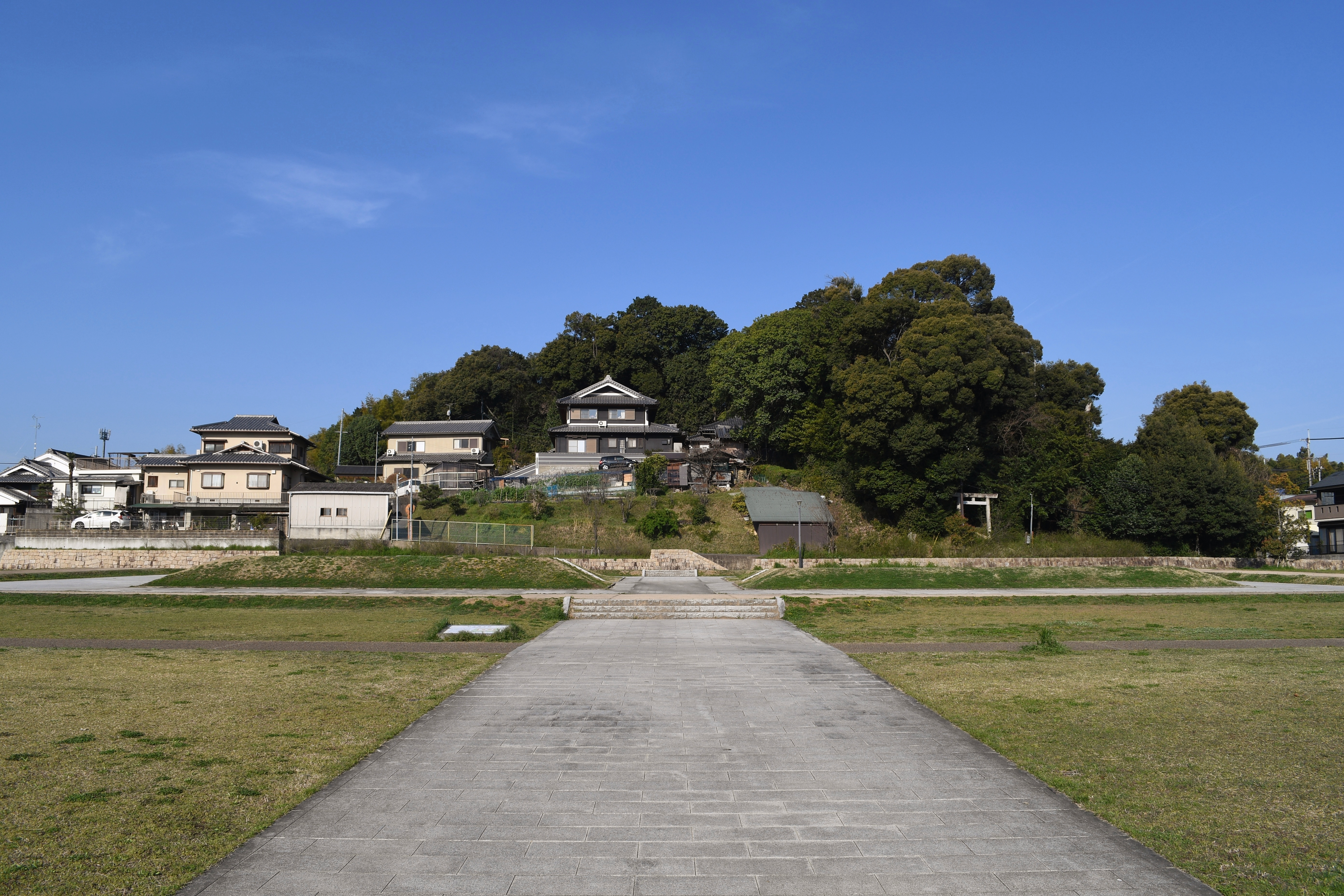
- Ninji temple ruins

- Ninji temple ruins Ninji temple ruins (Japan)
- Interactive map of Ninji temple ruins
- Periods: Asuka period
- Location: Kashiba, Nara, Japan
- Region: Kansai region

Site notes
- Public access: Yes

The Ninji temple ruins (尼寺廃寺跡, Ninji haji ato) is an archaeological site with the ruins of two late Asuka period Buddhist temples located in the city of Kashiba, Nara Prefecture, Japan. The temple no longer exists, but the ruins were designated as a National Historic Site in 2002.

== Overview ==
The Ninji temple site is located in the hills on the western edge of the Nara Basin, north of Mount Futagami, which is on the border between Osaka Prefecture and Nara Prefecture. It consists of two temple ruins, designated the "North temple site" and the "South temple site", separated by about 200 meters.

As a result of archaeological excavations of the "North temple site" from 1991 to 2000, it was found that the central temple complex is arranged in the Hōryū-ji style orientated to the east, with the Kondō to the north and the Pagoda to the south, and a cloister with a Middle Gate to the east forming a courtyard surrounding these structures. The area of the central temple complex surrounded by the corridor is approximately 71.4 meters north-to-south and 44.8 meters east-to-west. The foundation of the Kondō is approximately 16.2 by 13.6 meters, and the Pagoda has a foundation approximately 13.6 meters square. A huge semi-underground core stone measuring 3.8 meters square was discovered at the base of the pagoda foundations, which is one of the largest core stones discovered in Japan. From a cavity within this core stone, relic ornaments consisting of twelve earrings, four crystal balls, three glass balls, and one knife were discovered. The artifacts excavated from the central stone of the pagoda were designated a tangible cultural property of Nara Prefecture in 2019. The temple grounds are thought to be over 110 meters north-to-south and approximately 80 meters east-to-west, and it has been confirmed that there were earthen walls on the south and east sides. The East Gate was also discovered in what is estimated to be almost the center of the earthen walls on the east side, and based on the style of the roof tiles and the possible of the use of Chinese measuring scales, it is believed that the temple was built in the late 7th century to early 8th century. It was then burned down in the early Heian period in the 9th to 10th centuries, and continued to exist until the late Middle Ages, but was finally abandoned in the early 18th century.

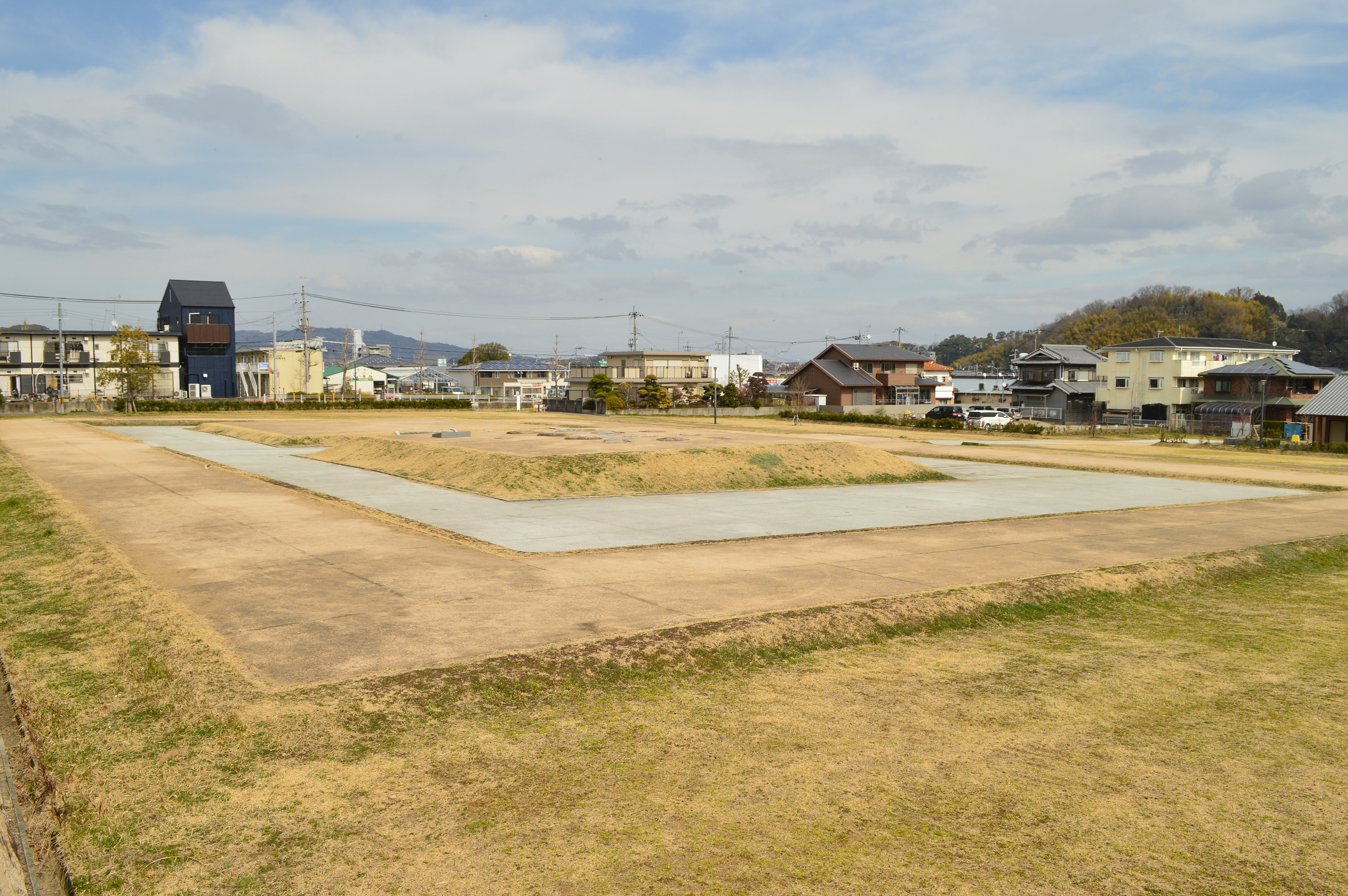
Panoramic view of the North temple site

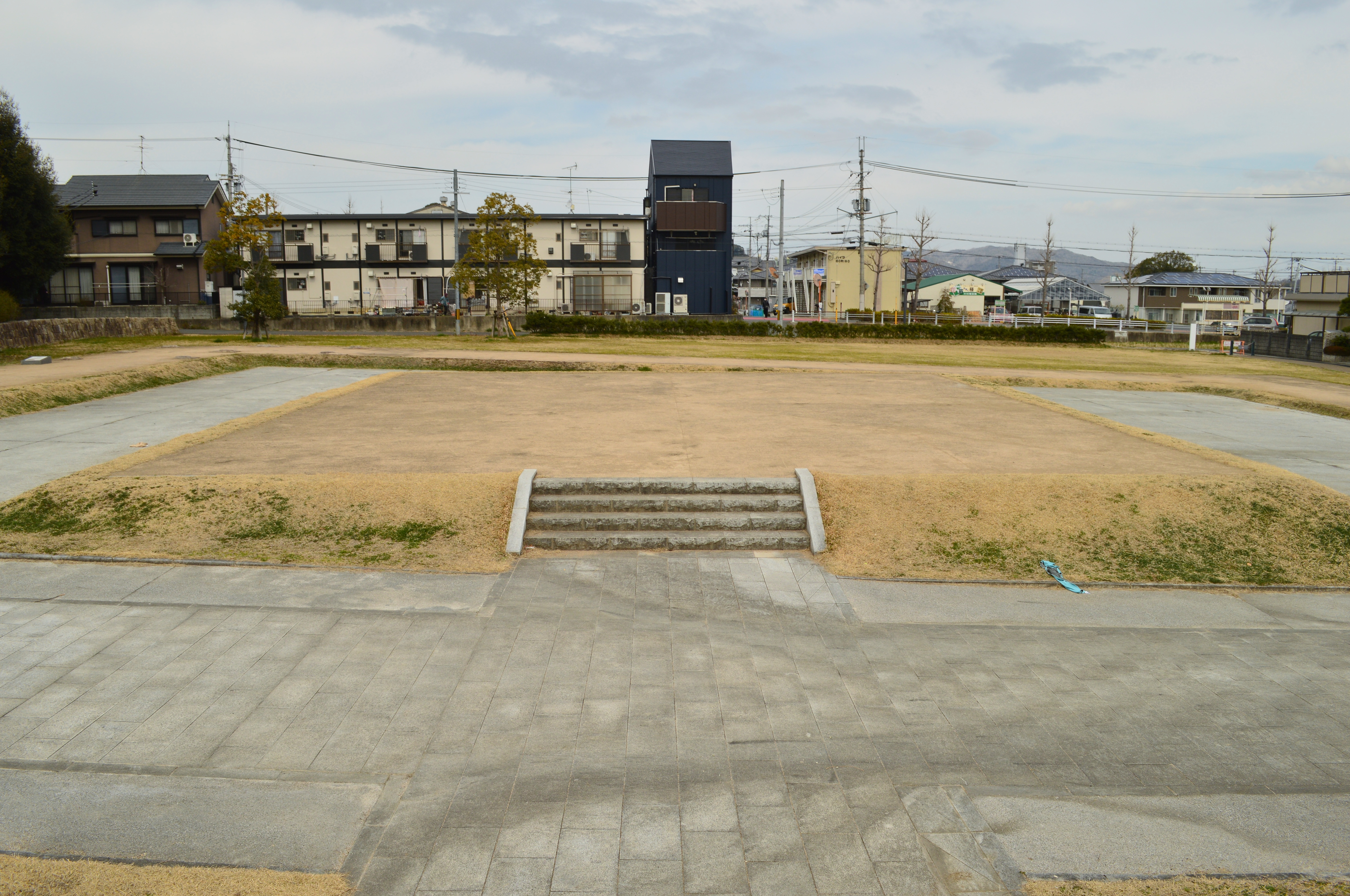
Foundations of the Kondo

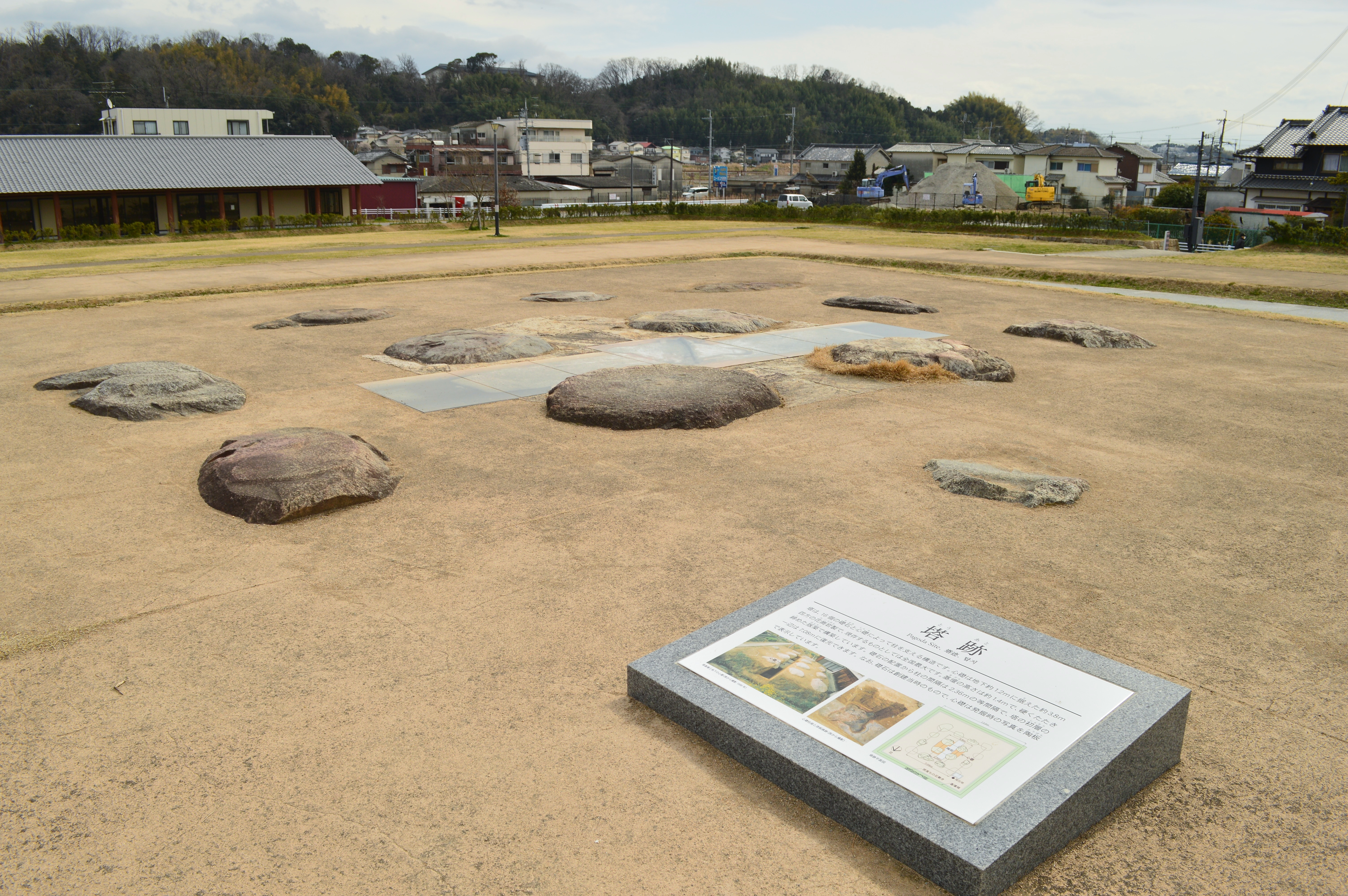
Foundations of the Pagoda

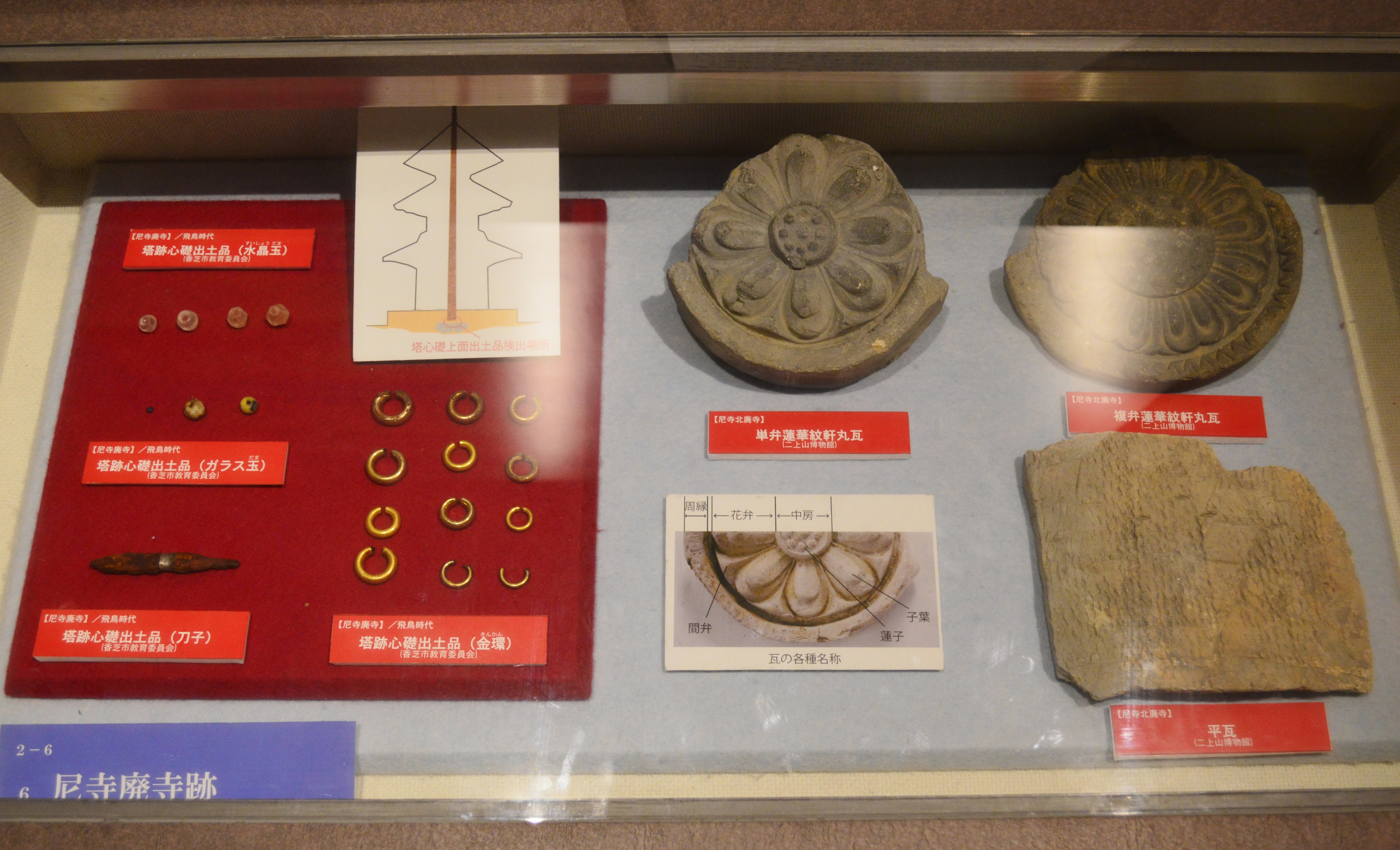
Artifacts from the pagoda base and temple site

The "South temple site" was partially excavated in 2001. It was found to also have a Hōryū-ji-style layout, but orientated to the south. The foundations of the Main Hall and Pagoda are located under a later temple, the Hanya-in. The "South temple" appears to have been constructed in the early 7th century, pre-dating the North temple, and was abandoned in the Heian period.

The surrounding area is home to a concentration of ruins from the 7th century, including the Hirano Kofun Group and Hirano Kiln Sites. It area in which it is located was the stronghold of the Kayanui clan, descendants of Emperor Bidatsu. The actual name of the temple is not known, as it does not appear in historical documentation, but there is a theory that it is the ruins of the Katsuragi Nunnery (Katsuragi Temple) built by Prince Shōtoku as described in the Nihon Shoki and other documents. However, another theory is that this is the Hanya-ji temple named on an inscription on a wooden tablet unearthed at the Asukaike ruins from the late 7th century, and that a "Hanya-in" still exists near the southern temple site. Furthermore, this Hanya-in has a bell within an inscription "Kegon-san Hannya-in Katago-niji Temple," which suggests that the temple was also called "Kataoka-niji", a name which is mentioned in the Horyu-ji Garan Engi Heiruki Zaizaicho.

Currently, the site has been renovated and is open to the public as the "Kashiba City Abandoned Nunnery Site Historical Site Park." The site is approximately ten minutes on foot from Hatada Station on the JR West Wakayama Line.

== See also ==
- List of Historic Sites of Japan (Nara)
